= Filipino cuisine =

Culinary traditions of the Philippines

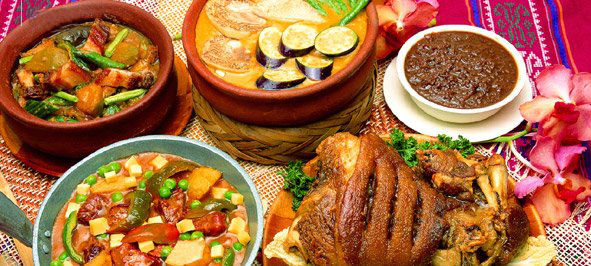
A variety of Filipino dishes

Filipino cuisine includes the food traditions of more than a hundred ethnolinguistic groups across the Philippine archipelago. Most widely known Filipino dishes come from the culinary traditions of groups such as the Ilocano, Pangasinan, Kapampangan, Tagalog, Bicolano, Visayan, Chavacano, and Maranao communities. The dishes associated with these groups evolved over the centuries from a largely indigenous (largely Austronesian) base shared with maritime Southeast Asia with varied influences from Chinese, Spanish, and American cuisines, in line with the major waves of influence that had enriched the cultures of the archipelago, and adapted using indigenous ingredients to meet local preferences.

Dishes range from a simple meal of fried salted fish and rice to curries, paellas, and cozidos of Iberian origin made for fiestas. Popular dishes include lechón (whole roasted pig), longganisa (Philippine sausage), tapa (cured beef), torta (omelette), adobo (vinegar and soy sauce-based stew), kaldereta (meat stewed in tomato sauce and liver paste), mechado (larded beef in soy and tomato sauce), pochero (beef and bananas in tomato sauce), afritada (chicken or beef and vegetables simmered in tomato sauce), kare-kare (oxtail and vegetables cooked in peanut sauce), pinakbet (kabocha squash, eggplant, beans, okra, bitter melon, and tomato stew flavored with shrimp paste), sinigang (meat or seafood with vegetables in sour broth), pancit (noodles), and lumpia (fresh or fried spring rolls).

== History ==
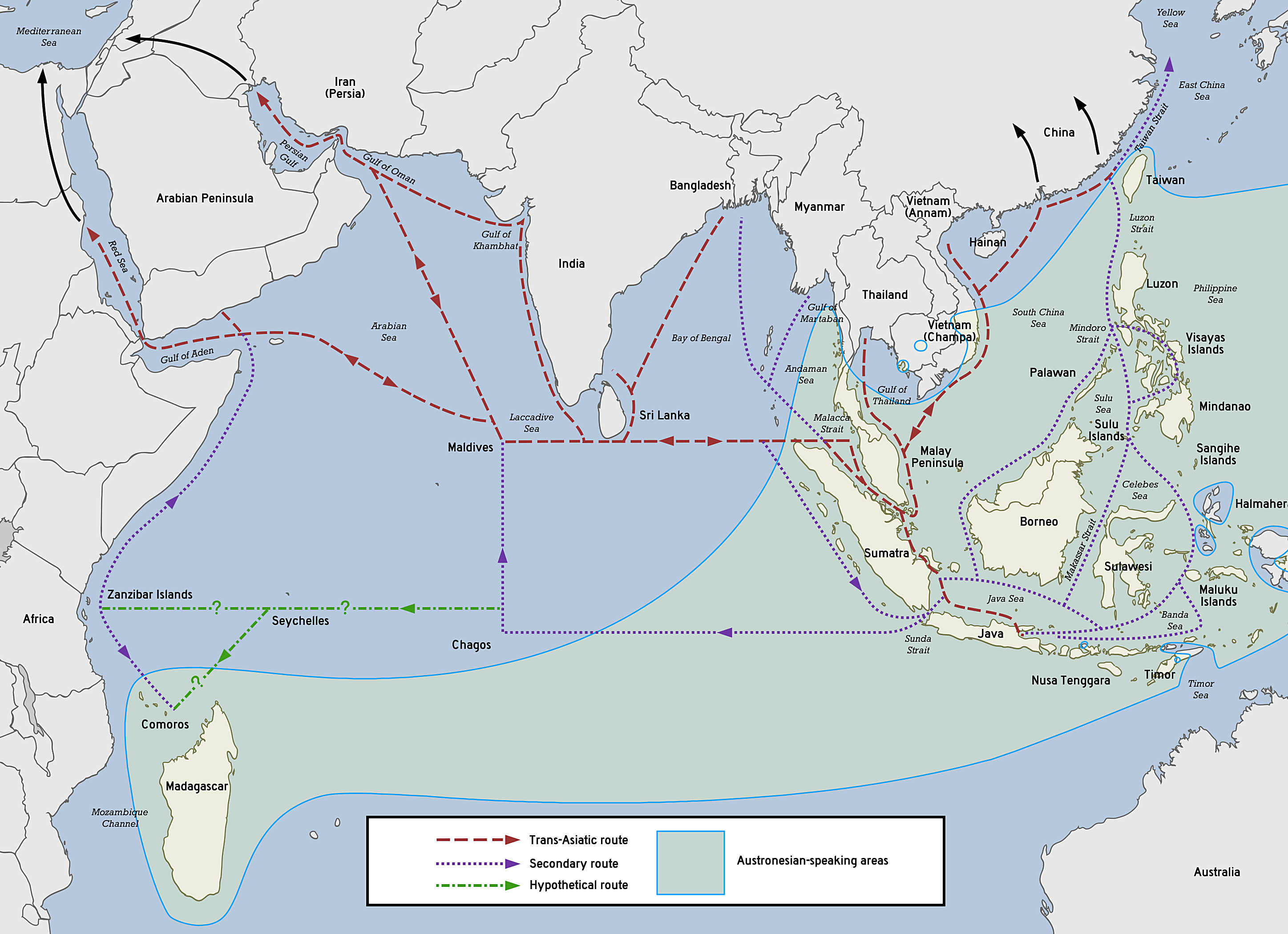
Austronesian maritime trade routes (including the Spice Trade and Maritime Silk Road) which enabled the exchange of cuisine and ingredients between Island Southeast Asia, South Asia, and China.

Negritos, the first peoples of the Philippine archipelago, were nomadic hunter-gatherers whose diet consisted of foraged wild tubers, seafood, and game meat.

Remains of tubers that are identified as probably ube (Dioscorea alata) have been recovered from the Ille Cave of Palawan (c. 11,000 BP). This also serves as evidence that ube is native to Island Southeast Asia and evidence that humans from that period already knew to exploit starchy plants. Ube also appears in archaeological records in the Batanes Islands by about 3,500 years ago, associated with some of the earliest farming communities in the region. Among the yam species that were cultivated independently within Island Southeast Asia and New Guinea, ube and lesser yams were the only ones regularly cultivated and eaten because the other species were usually considered as famine food due to their higher levels of the toxin dioscorine which requires that they be prepared correctly before consumption.

The earliest evidence of chicken being fried in the Philippines was found in a Philippine archeological site.

Around 6000 BP, subsequent migrations of seafaring Austronesians, whom the majority of contemporary Filipinos descend from, brought new techniques in aquaculture and agriculture, and various domesticated foodstuffs and animals across the Pacific and Indian Oceans.

Domesticated pigs came from Taiwan to northern Luzon around 4500–4000 years ago, which then spread from the Philippines to the Mariana Islands around 3500 years ago, along with red-slipped pottery.

=== Pre-Colonial period ===
It is believed that taro cultivation drove the start of terracing in the Cordilleras less than one thousand years. Taro was later replaced by rice around 1600 A.D., which is the predominant crop today. Although there is no solid evidence that paddy rice was cultivated in the Philippines earlier than about 700 years ago, the start of rice cultivation was a major development in Filipino cuisine. Using only basic tools, the Ifugao built the Banaue Rice Terraces using stone and mud walls to create flat surfaces on the steep mountain slopes, which allowed them to cultivate rice in the highlands. The plains of central and southwestern Luzon, Bicol peninsula, and eastern Panay were major producers of rice, exporting surplus elsewhere to the rest of the archipelago. Rice was a symbol of wealth, with many rice-based delicacies used as offerings in important ceremonies. Like much of Asia, rice is a staple of Filipino cuisine. Rice-based dishes are common among all regions, with influences from various countries, e.g., arroz caldo is similar to Chinese congee.

While the colonial periods brought much influence to the culture and cuisine of the Philippines, the influence of countries surrounding the Philippines before those times as well as the origins of that cuisine within the Philippines itself are also vitally important. Pre-dating their colonization by the Spaniards, the Philippines had frequent enough trade with China in that there were Chinese outposts along some of the coastal cities of the Philippines. The Chinese introduced rice noodles to the islands, the main ingredient of pancit, and eggrolls; the Philippine version is known as lumpia.

=== Spanish colonial period ===
Spanish rule ushered several large changes to the cuisines of much of the archipelago, from the formation of the Manila galleon trade network to domestic agricultural reform. The galleon trade brought two significant culinary influences to the islands: Chinese and Mexican.

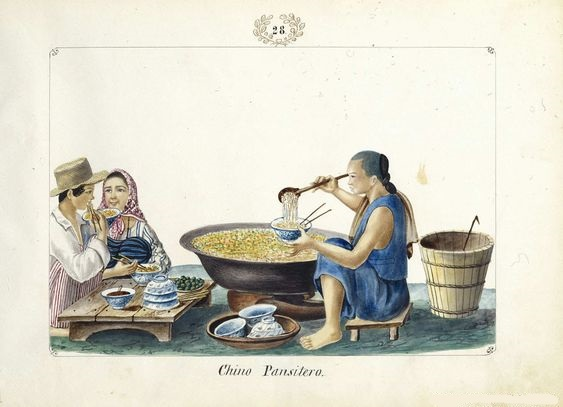
Chinese pancitero serving pancit

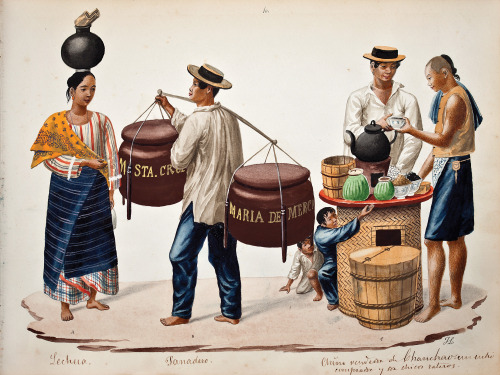
A scene of economic life in Spanish colonial Philippines featuring Filipino and Chinese migrant food vendors.

The galleon exchange was mainly between Manila and Acapulco, mainland New Spain (present-day Mexico), hence influence from Mexican cuisine brought a vast array of both New World and Spanish foodstuffs and techniques. Directly from the Americas were primarily crops: maize, chili peppers, bell peppers, tomatoes, potatoes, peanuts, chocolate, pineapples, coffee beans, jicama, various squashes, annatto, and avocados, among others. Mexicans and other Latin Americans also brought various Spanish cooking techniques, including sofrito, sausage making (longganisa, despite more akin to chorizos), bread baking, alongside many dishes giving way to locally adapted empanadas, paellas, omelettes called tortas, and tamales.

Likewise, migrating Filipinos brought their culinary techniques, dishes, and produce to the Americas and several Pacific islands also under Spanish rule, notably Guam and the Marianas. Rice, sugarcane, coconuts, citruses, mangoes, and tamarind from the Philippine islands were all naturalized in these areas. Within Mexican cuisine, Filipino influence is particularly prevalent in the west coast of Guerrero, which includes tuba winemaking, guinatan coconut milk-based dishes, and probably ceviche. In Guam, several Filipino dishes like pancit and lumpia became regular fare, and dishes like kelaguen and kalamai were local adaptations of Filipino predecessors (respectively, kilawin and kalamay).

=== American colonial period ===
The United States emerged as the victor of the Spanish–American War in 1898, purchasing the Philippines from Spain for $20 million during the Treaty of Paris. The Philippines remained a colony until 1946. Americans introduced Filipinos to fast food, including hot dogs, hamburgers, ice cream, and American-style fried chicken, different from the fried chicken already known in the country since pre-colonial times. American-style fried chicken was popularized by the Manila restaurant Tom's Dixie Kitchen. They also introduced convenient foods such as Spam, corned beef, instant coffee, and evaporated milk. Today, Spam is a common breakfast item often served with garlic fried rice.

=== Contemporary period ===
Filipino cuisine continues to evolve as new techniques and styles of cooking, and ingredients find their way into the country. Traditional dishes both simple and elaborate, indigenous and foreign-influenced, are seen as are more current popular international dishes and fast food fare. However, the Filipino diet is higher in total fat, saturated fat, and cholesterol than other Asian diets. In 2013, President Noynoy Aquino signed Republic Act No. 10611, or the Food Safety Act, to establish safeguards for the Filipino people's diet and health in regards to food quality and consumption. In 2022, TasteAtlas ranked Filipino cuisine as the 23rd best in the world, while chicken inasal and sisig were ranked one of the best dishes globally.

In 2025, the Michelin Guide announced that it would release its first selection of restaurants in the Greater Manila and Cebu areas by 2026. This marks the first time that the Philippines will be included in the prestigious international restaurant guide.

=== Filipino herbs and spices ===
Filipino herbs and spices include ginger, lemongrass, annato, tamarind, pandan and galangal.

== Characteristics ==
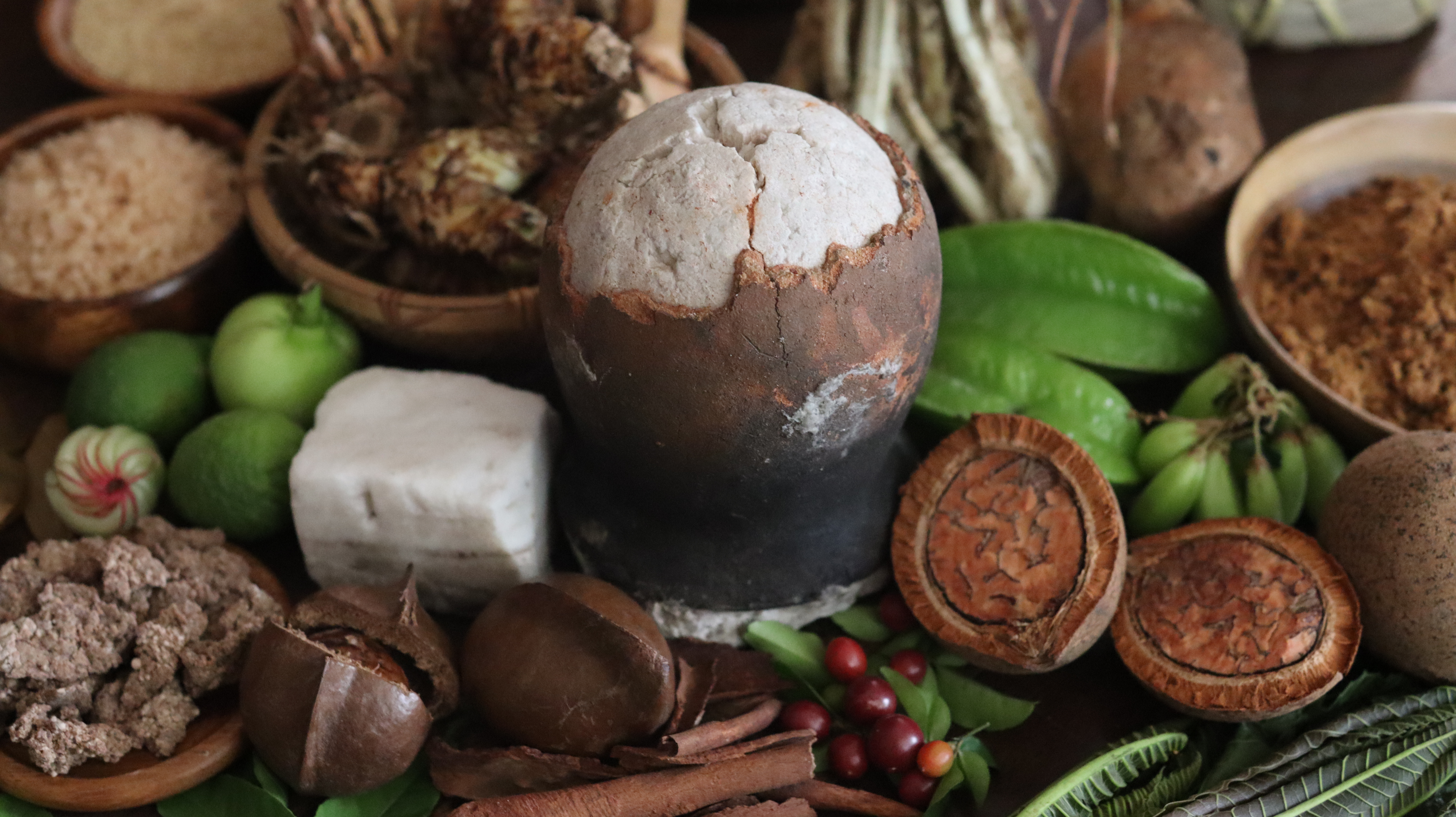
An array of diverse native Filipino culinary ingredients.

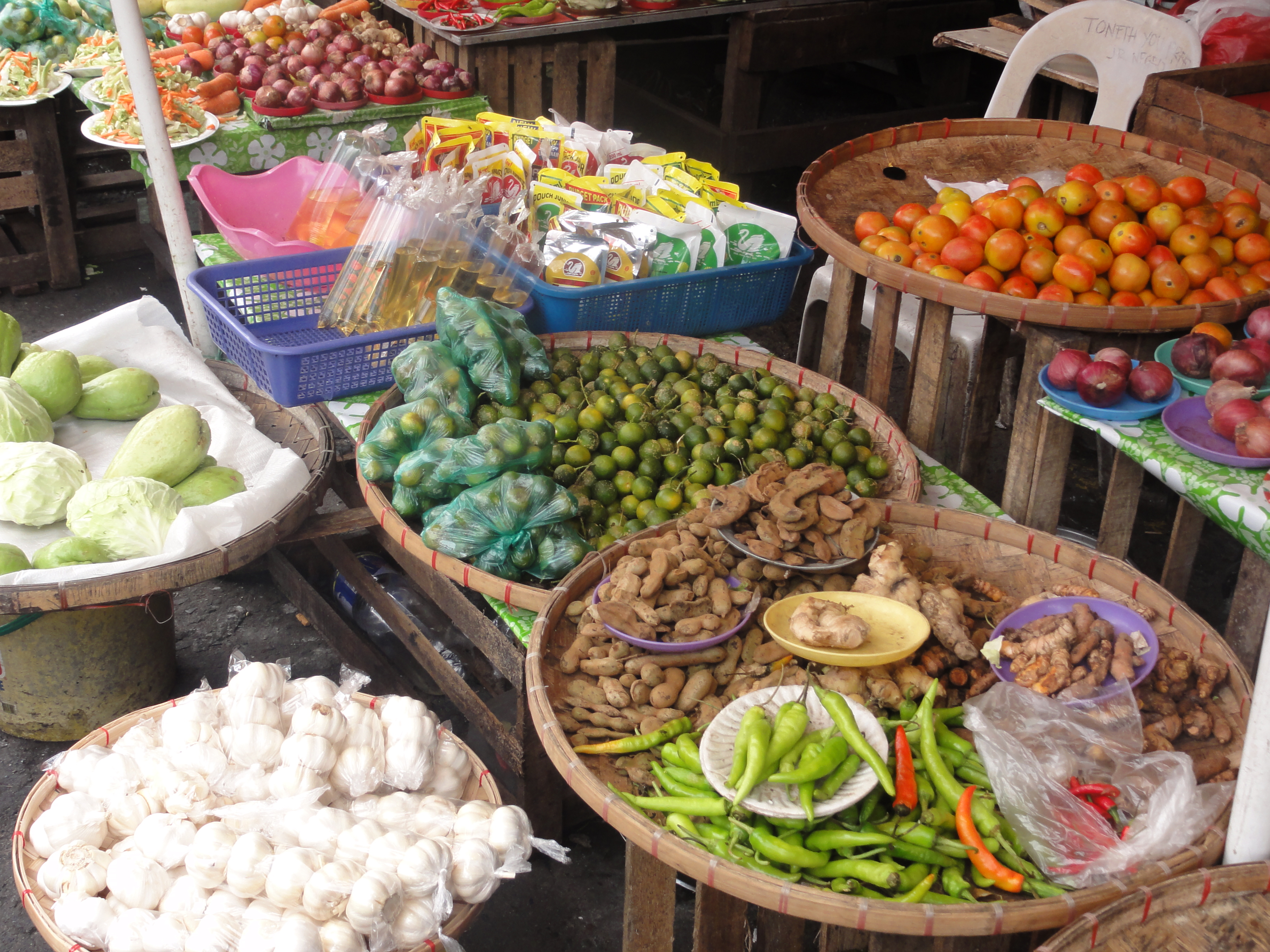
Typical Filipino ingredients displayed in local markets.

Filipino cuisine highlight the interplay of sweet (tamis), sour (asim), and salty (alat) flavors. In regions such as Bicol, the Cordilleras, and in many Muslim Filipino communities, spiciness (anghang) also plays a central role.

The cuisine often uses contrast as a guiding principle. Sweet and salty elements are commonly paired to create balance. Champorado, a sweet cocoa rice porridge is traditionally eaten with tuyo, a salted dried fish. Dinuguan, a savory stew made of pig's blood, is often served with puto, a sweet steamed rice cake. Unripe fruits such as green mangoes are eaten with salt or bagoong. Cheese, which is salty-sweet profile, appears in desserts such as bibingka and puto and is also used as an ice cream flavor.

=== Native ingredients ===
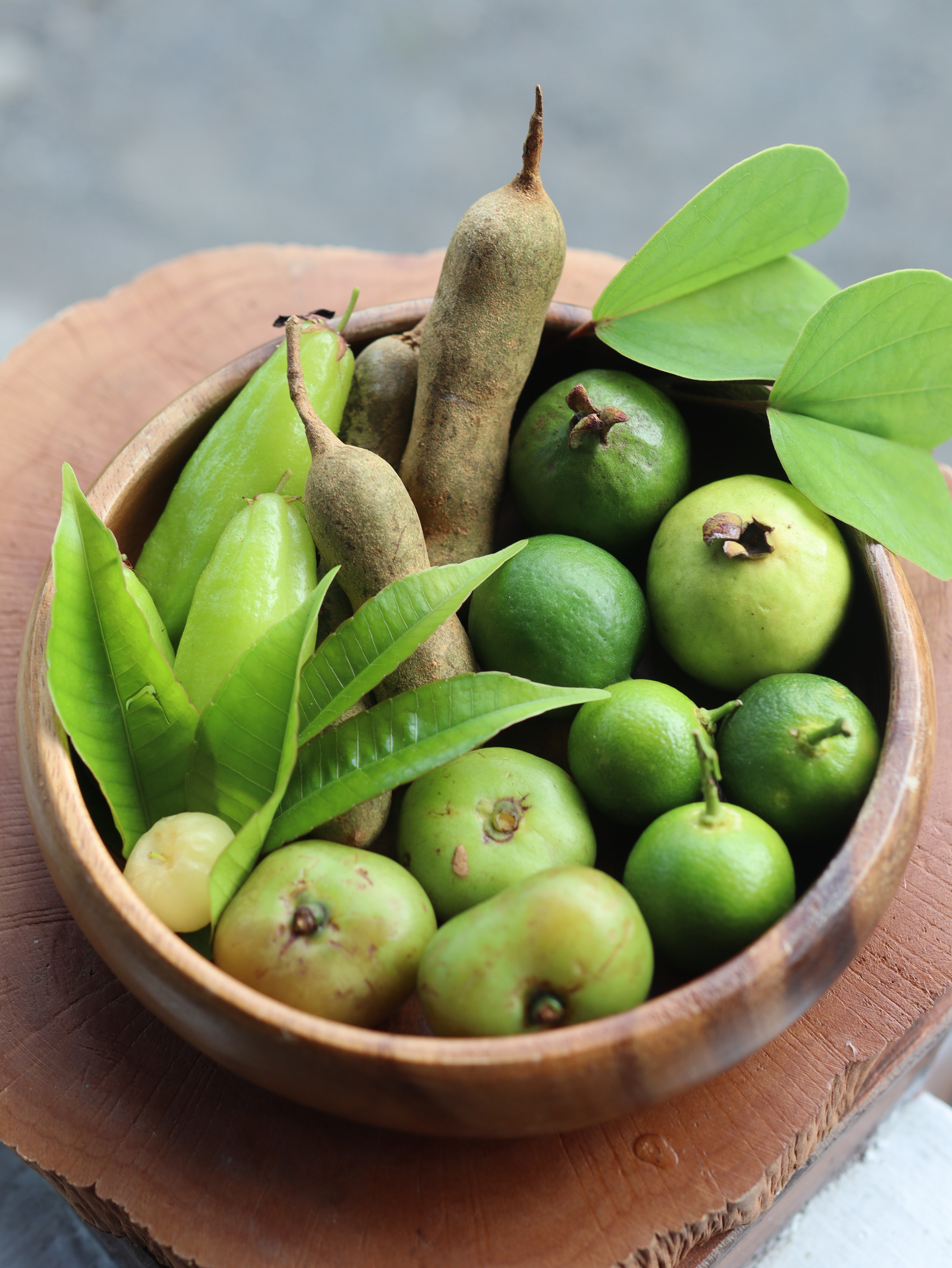
Filipino souring agents: Calamansi, Alibangbang, Tamarind, Kamias, Bayabas, Dayap, Batwan, Libas, Bangkiling/Karamay.

Filipino cuisine uses a variety of native ingredients. The biota that developed yielded a particular landscape and in turn gave the place local ingredients that enhanced flavors to the dishes. Kalamansi, a fruit that belongs to the genus citrus, is one of these well known ingredients and is mostly used to contribute sourness to a dish. Another is the tabon-tabon, a tropical fruit used by pre-colonial Filipinos as an anti-bacterial ingredient, especially in Kinilaw dishes.

The country also cultivates different types of nuts, including the pili nut, of which the Philippines is the only known exporter of edible varieties. It is usually made as a merienda or is incorporated in other desserts to enhance the flavor due to the milky texture it gives off as it melts in the mouth.

Vinegar is a common ingredient. Adobo is popular not solely for its simplicity and ease of preparation, but also for its ability to be stored for days without spoiling, and even improve in flavor with a day or two of storage. Tinapa is a smoke-cured fish while tuyo, daing, and dangit are corned, sun-dried fish popular because they can last for weeks without spoiling, even without refrigeration.

== Cooking, serving and consumption ==
Cooking and eating in the Philippines has traditionally been an informal and communal affair centered around the family kitchen. Food tends to be served all at once and not in courses.

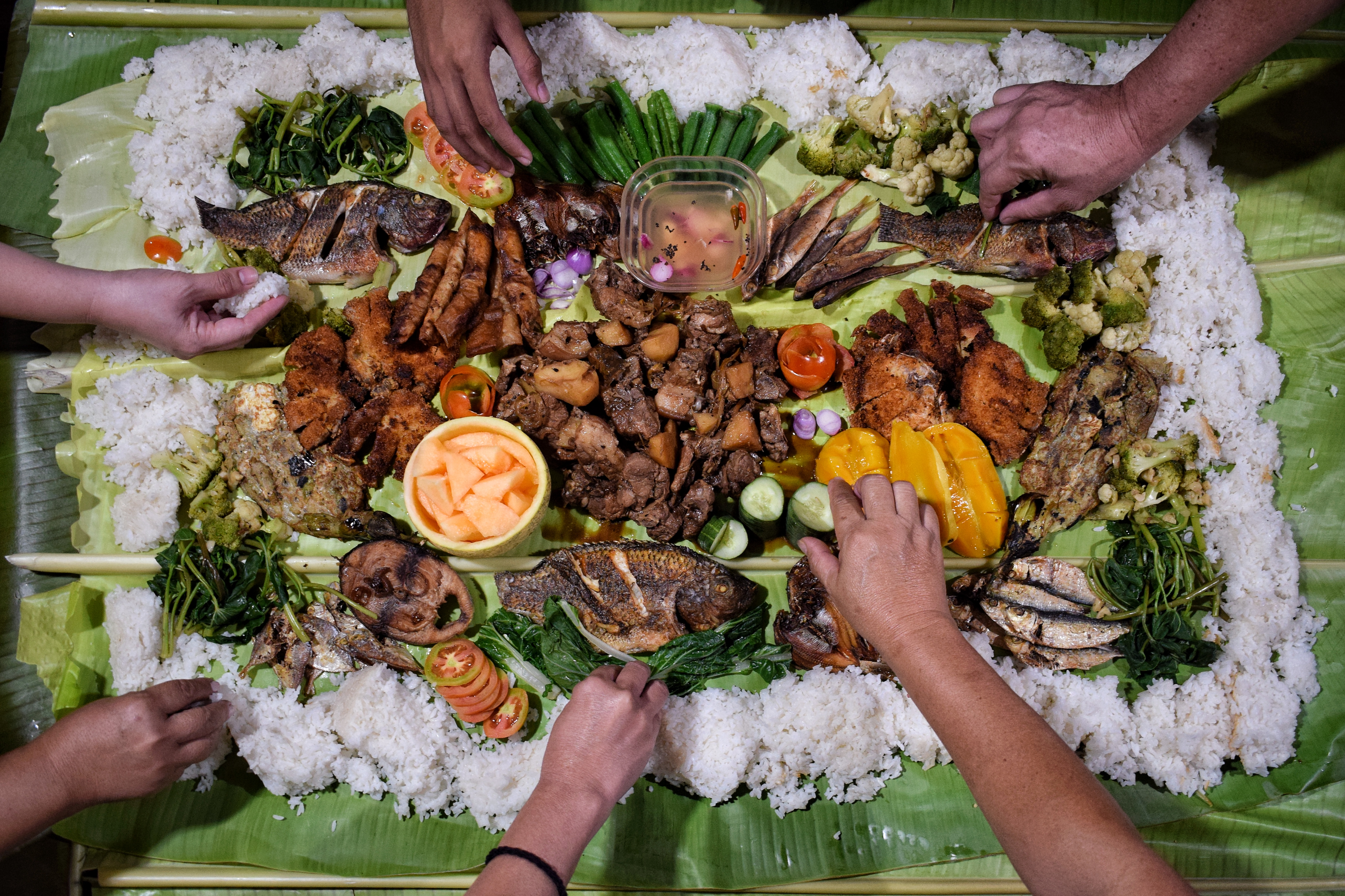
Kamayan (Boodle Fight), a traditional Filipino communal dining practice where food is served on banana leaves and eaten by hands.

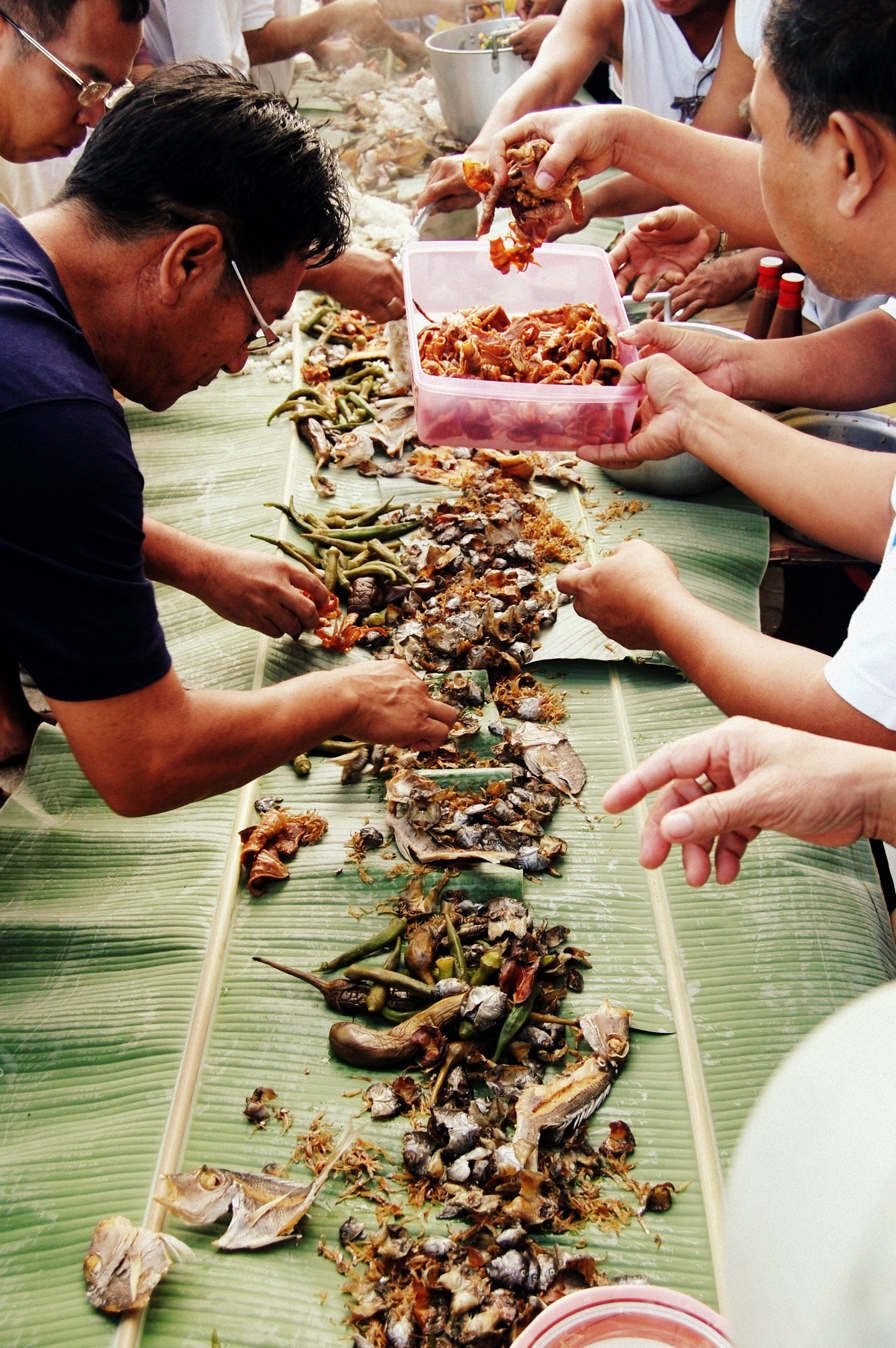
Boodle Fight during a fiesta in Baler, Aurora.

Like many of their Southeast Asian counterparts Filipinos do not eat with chopsticks. The traditional way of eating is with the hands, especially dry dishes such as inihaw or prito. The diner will take a bite of the main dish, then eat rice pressed together with their fingers. This practice, known as kamayan (using the washed left hand for picking the centralized food and the right hand for bringing food to the mouth), is rarely seen in urbanized areas. However, Filipinos tend to feel the spirit of kamayan when eating amidst nature during out-of-town trips, beach vacations, and town fiestas.

During the Spanish occupation, Filipinos ate with the paired utensils of spoon and fork. The knife was not used as in other countries, because Spanish colonizers prohibited Filipinos from owning knives. Filipinos typically use the side of the spoon to cut their food. Due to Western influence, food is often eaten using flatware—forks, knives, spoons—but the primary pairing of utensils used at a Filipino dining table is that of spoon and fork, not knife and fork.

Traditionally, Filipinos ate with their hands like the people of India. Kamayan is also used in the "boodle fight" concept, a style of dining popularized by the Philippine Army which utilizes banana leaves spread out on the table as the main serving platter, upon which is laid out portions of rice and a variety of Filipino dishes for friendly, filial or communal feasting. The use of spoons and forks, however, is still the norm.

=== Meals of the day ===
Filipinos traditionally eat three main meals a day: almusal or agahan (breakfast), tanghalían (lunch), and hapunan (dinner) plus morning and an afternoon snack called meryenda (also called minandál or minindál).

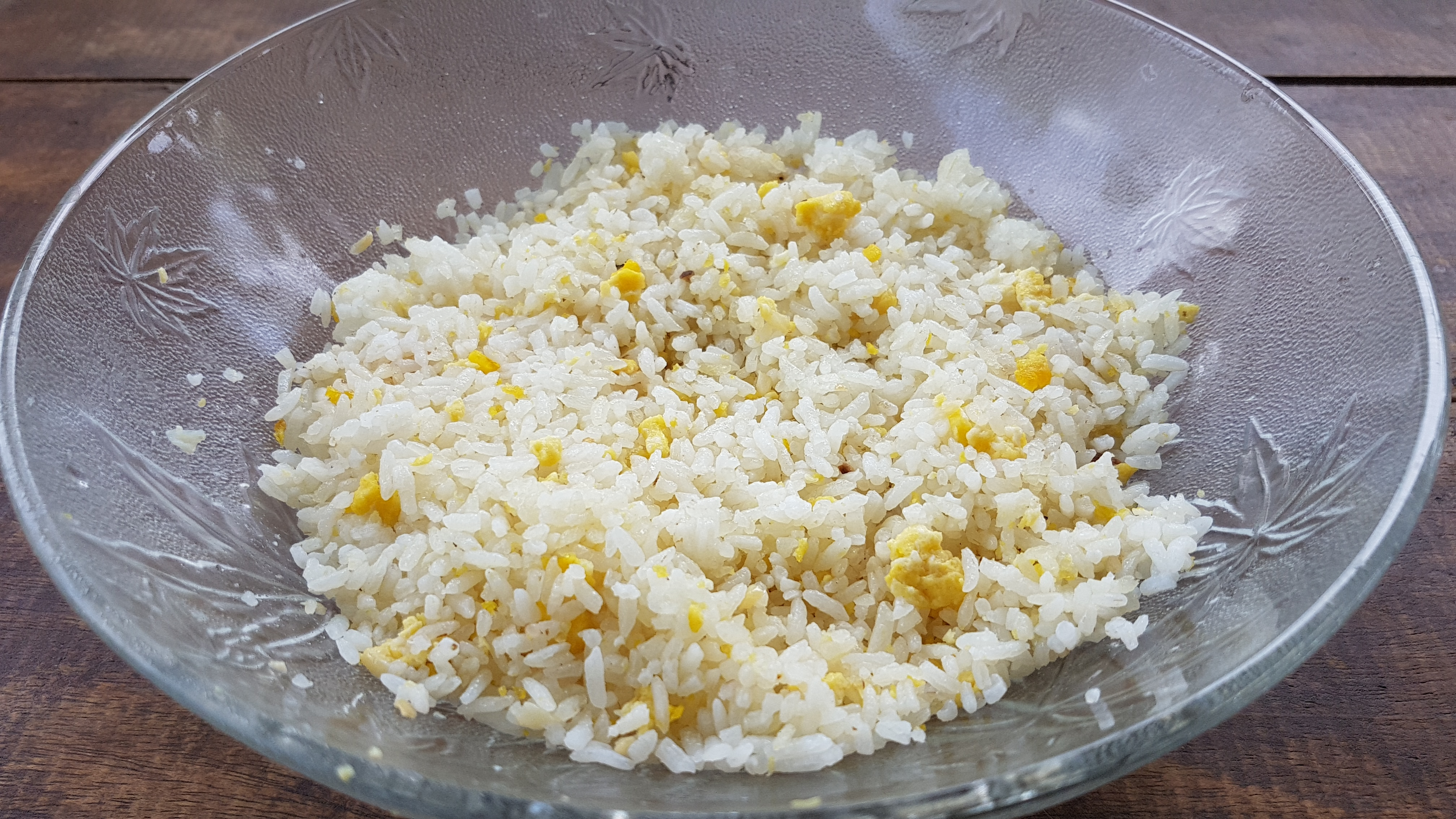
Sinangag, a Filipino garlic fried rice commonly served for breakfast with silog.

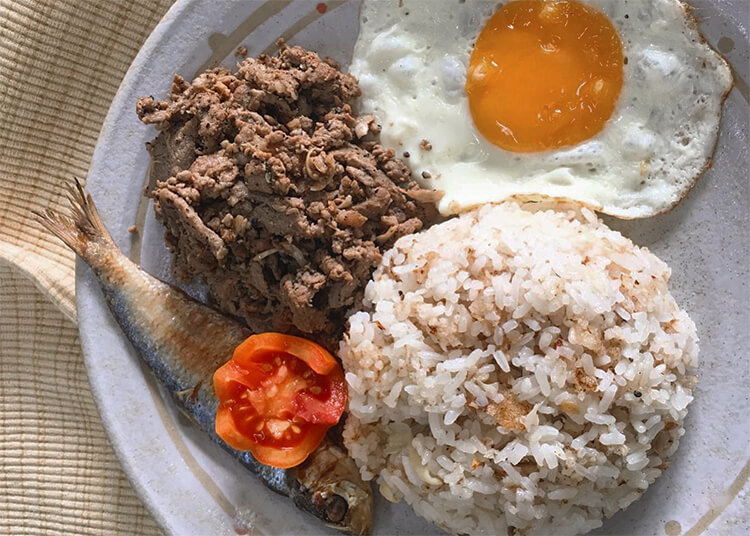
Silog, a Filipino breakfast combination of sinangag, egg, and a protein such as tapa or tuyo.

A traditional Filipino breakfast (almusal) might include pandesal (small bread rolls), kesong puti (fresh, unripened, white Filipino cheese, traditionally made from carabao's milk) champorado (chocolate rice porridge), silog which is sinangag (garlic fried rice) or sinaing, with fried egg and meat—such as tapa, longganisa, tocino, karne norte (corned beef), or fish such as daing na bangus (salted and dried milkfish)—or itlog na pula (salted duck eggs). Coffee is also commonly served, particularly kapeng barako, a variety of coffee produced in the mountains of Batangas noted for having a strong flavor.

Certain portmanteaus in Filipino have come into use to describe popular combinations of items in a Filipino breakfast. An example of such a combination order is kankamtuy: an order of kanin (rice), kamatis (tomatoes) and tuyo (dried fish). Another is tapsi: an order of tapa and sinangág or sinaing. Other examples include variations using a silog suffix, usually some kind of meat served with sinangág or sinaing, and itlog (egg). The three most commonly seen silogs are tapsilog (having tapa as the meat portion), tocilog (having tocino as the meat portion), and longsilog (having longganisa as the meat portion).

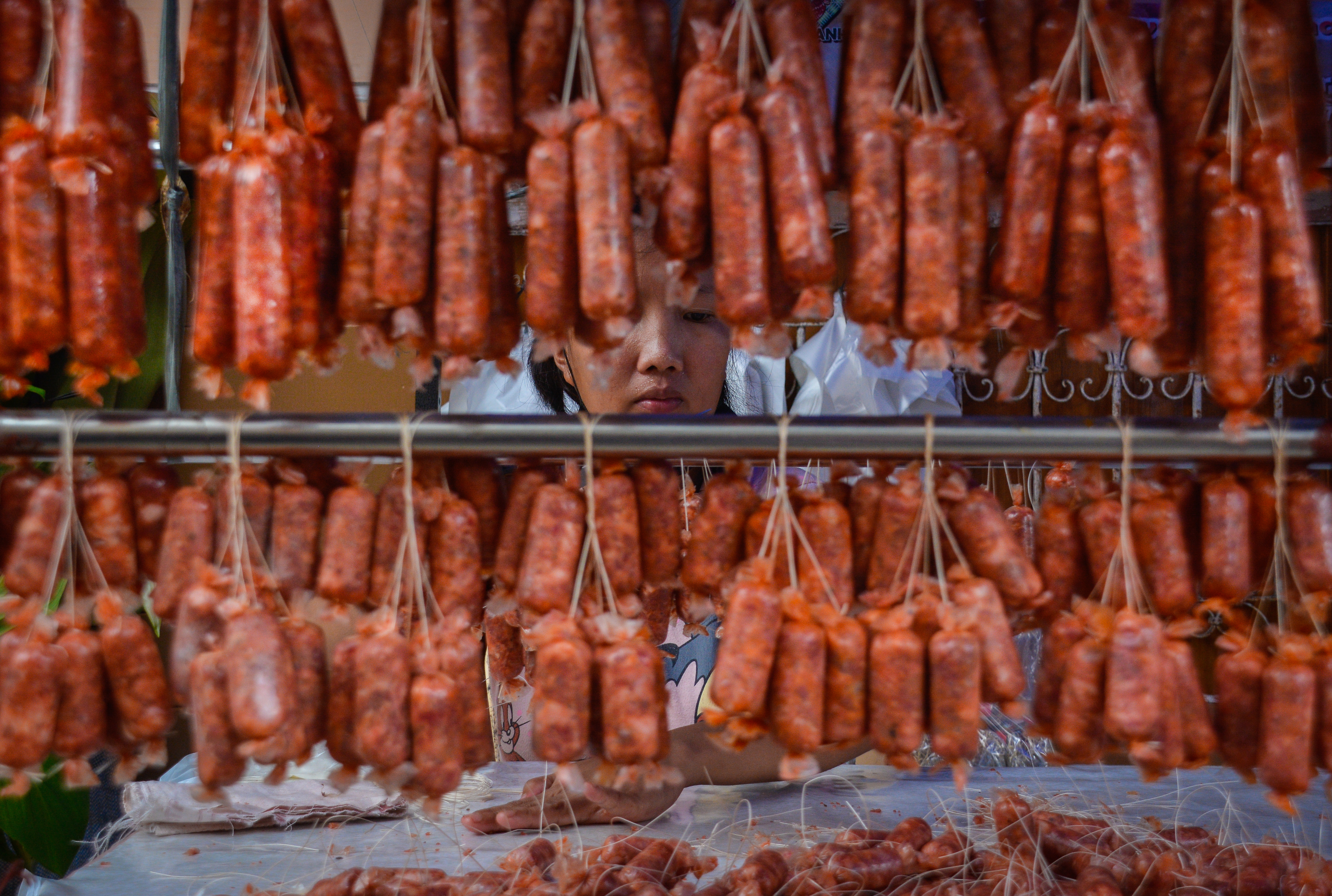
Longganisa a Filipino pork sausage from Lucban.

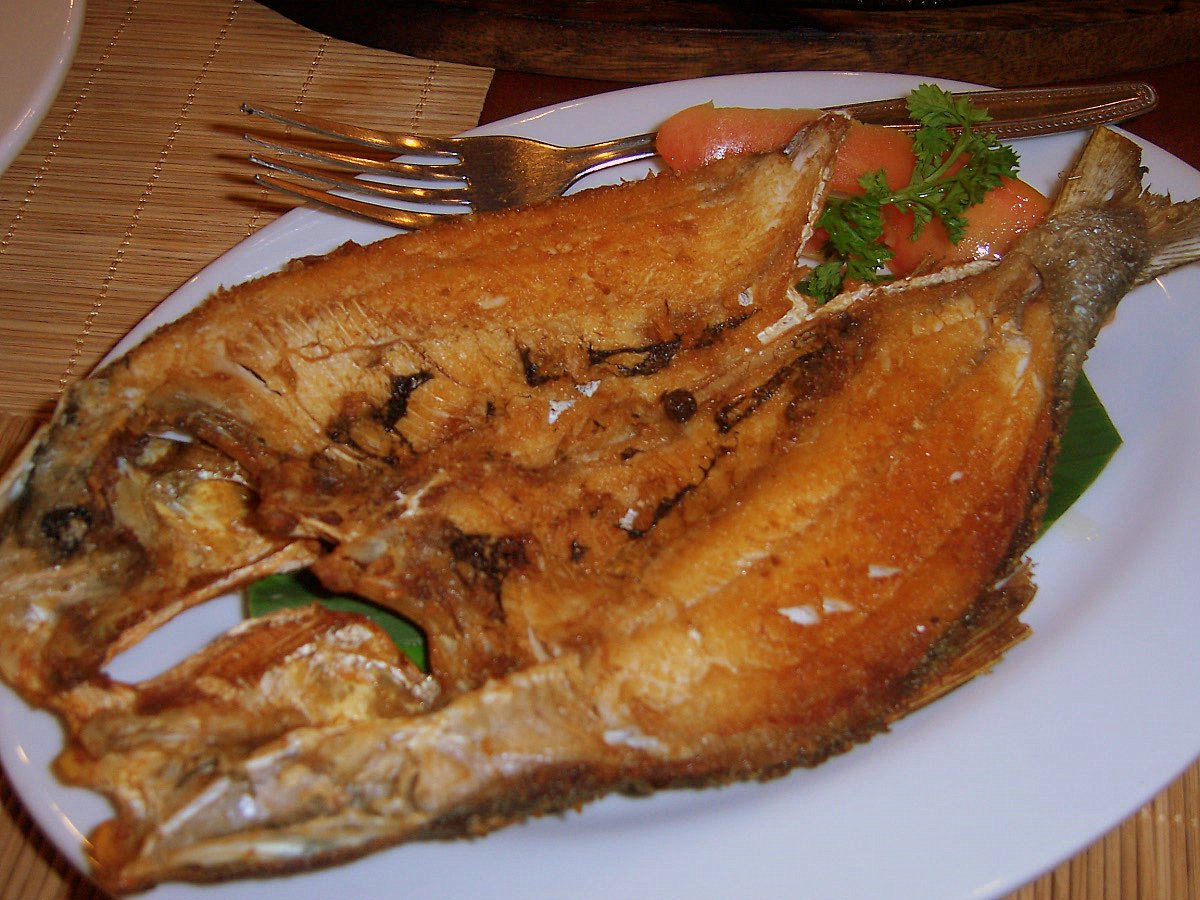
Daing, a fried, deboned bangus seasoned with vinegar and spices.

Other silogs include hotsilog (with a hot dog), bangsilog (with bangus (milkfish)), dangsilog (with danggit (rabbitfish)), spamsilog (with spam), adosilog (with adobo), chosilog (with chorizo), chiksilog (with chicken), cornsilog (with corned beef), and litsilog (with Manila lechon" (or "Luzon lechon"). Pankaplog is slang for a breakfast consisting of pandesal, kape (coffee), and itlog (egg). An establishment that specializes in such meals is called a tapsihan or tapsilugan.

A typical Filipino lunch (tanghalian) is composed of a food variant (or two for some) and rice, sometimes with soup. Whether grilled, stewed, or fried, rice is eaten with everything. Due to the tropical climate of the Philippines, the preference is to serve ice-cold water, juices, or soft drinks with meals.

Dinner, while still the main meal, is smaller than in other countries. Typical meals in a Filipino dinner are usually leftover meals from lunch. Filipino dinner is usually served in the time period between 6–8 pm, though dinner is served much earlier in the countryside.

=== Merienda ===
Merienda is taken from the Spanish, and is a light meal or snack especially in the afternoon, similar to the concept of afternoon tea. If the meal is taken close to dinner, it is called merienda cena, and may be served instead of dinner.

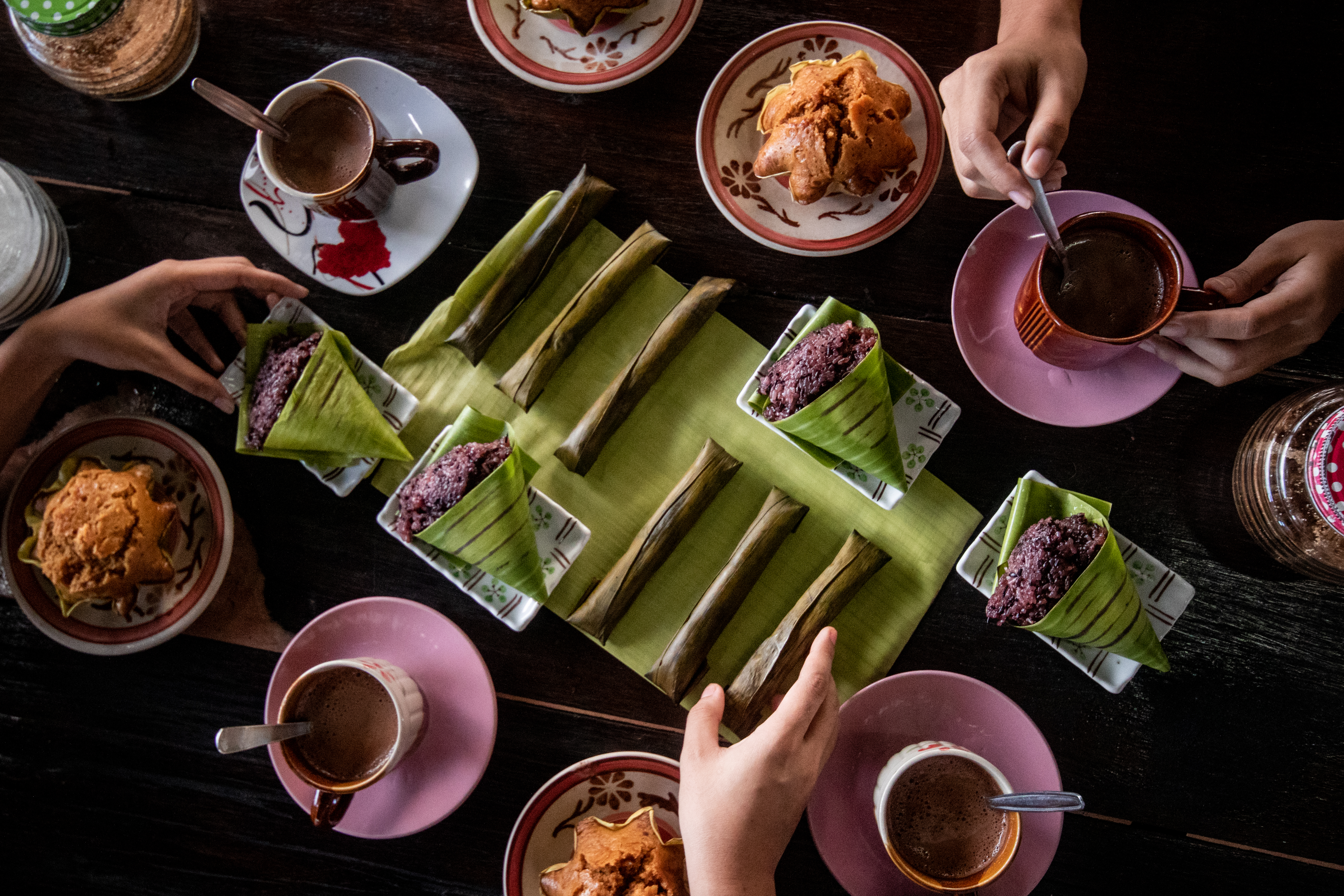
Merienda featuring Filipino rice cakes (kakanin), breads, and sikwate.

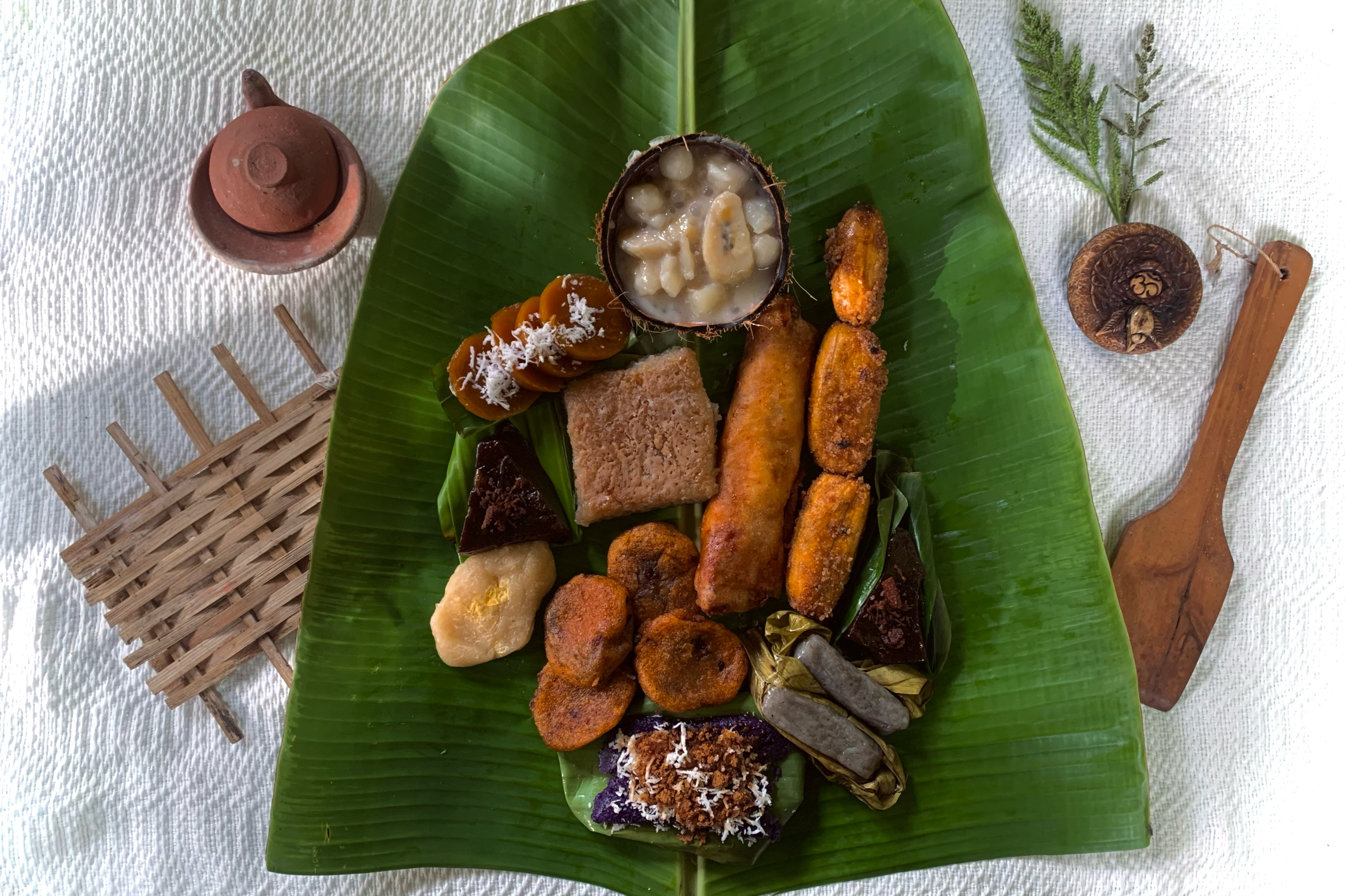
Classic Filipino merienda featuring ginataang bilo-bilo, kutsinta, bibingkang malagkit, turon, banana cue, kalamay, nilupak, buchi, suman, and puto bumbong.

Filipinos have a number of options to take with kapé, which is the Filipino pronunciation of café (coffee): breads and pastries like pandesal, ensaymada (buttery brioche covered in grated cheese and sugar), hopia (pastries similar to mooncakes filled with mung bean paste) and empanada (savoury, meat-filled pasties). Also popular are kakanín, or traditional pastries made from sticky rice like kutsinta, sapin-sapin (multicoloured, layered pastry), palitaw, biko, suman, bibingka, and pitsi-pitsî (served with desiccated coconut).

Savoury dishes often eaten during merienda include pancit canton (stir-fried noodles), palabok (rice noodles with a shrimp-based sauce), tokwa't baboy (fried tofu with boiled pork ears in a garlic-flavored soy sauce and vinegar dressing), and dinuguan (a spicy stew made of pork blood), which is often served with puto (steamed rice flour cakes).

Dim sum and dumplings, brought to the islands by Fujianese migrants, have been given a Filipino touch and are also popular merienda fare. Street food, such as squid balls and fish balls, are often skewered on bamboo sticks and consumed with soy sauce and the sour juice of the calamondin as condiments.

=== Pulutan ===
Pulutan (from the Filipino word pulot which literally means "to pick up") is a term roughly analogous to the English term "finger food" or Spanish tapas. Originally, it was a snack accompanied with liquor or beer but has found its way into Filipino cuisine as appetizers or, in some cases, main dishes, as in the case of sisig.

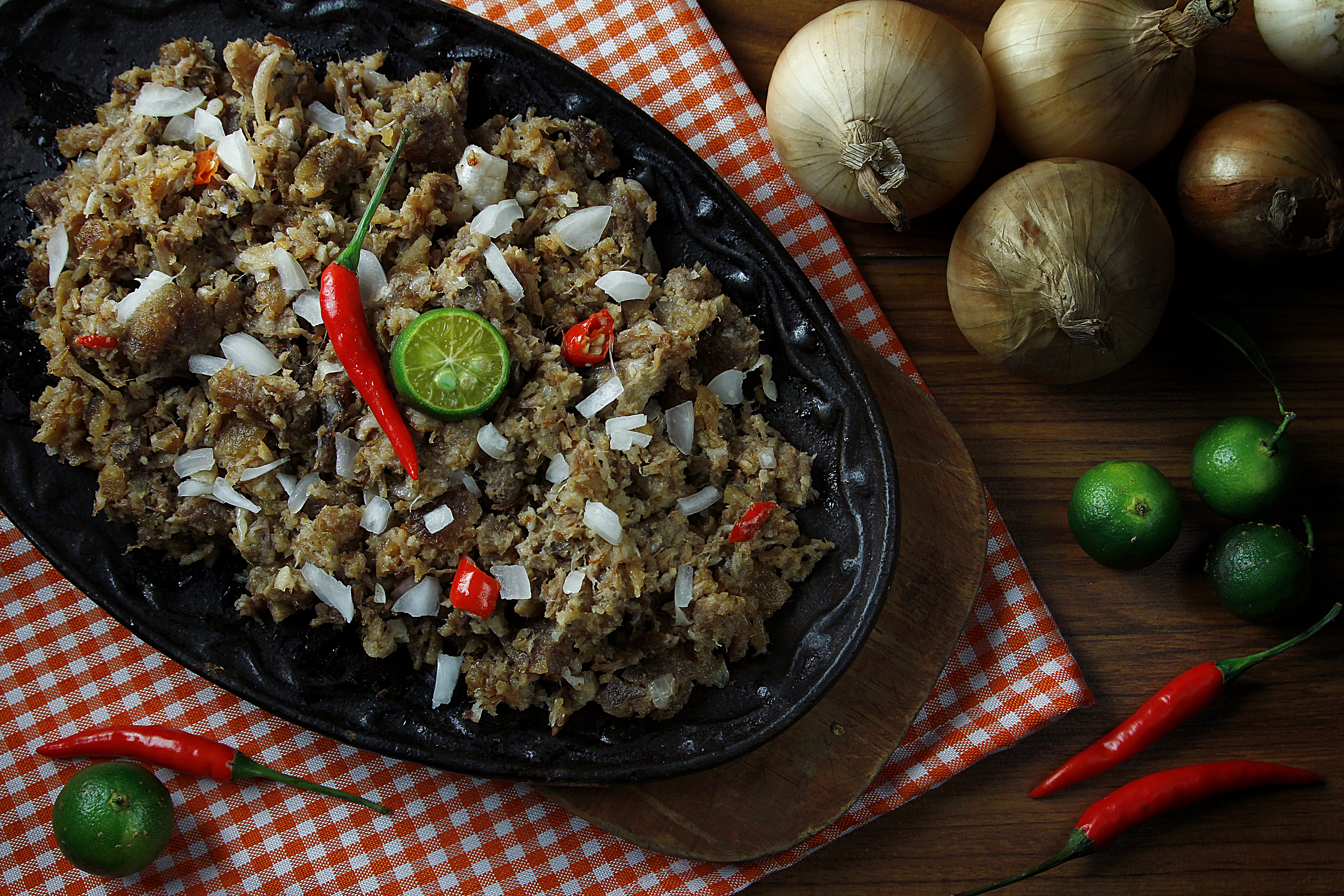
Sisig, a popular Filipino pulutan (appetizer served with drinks).

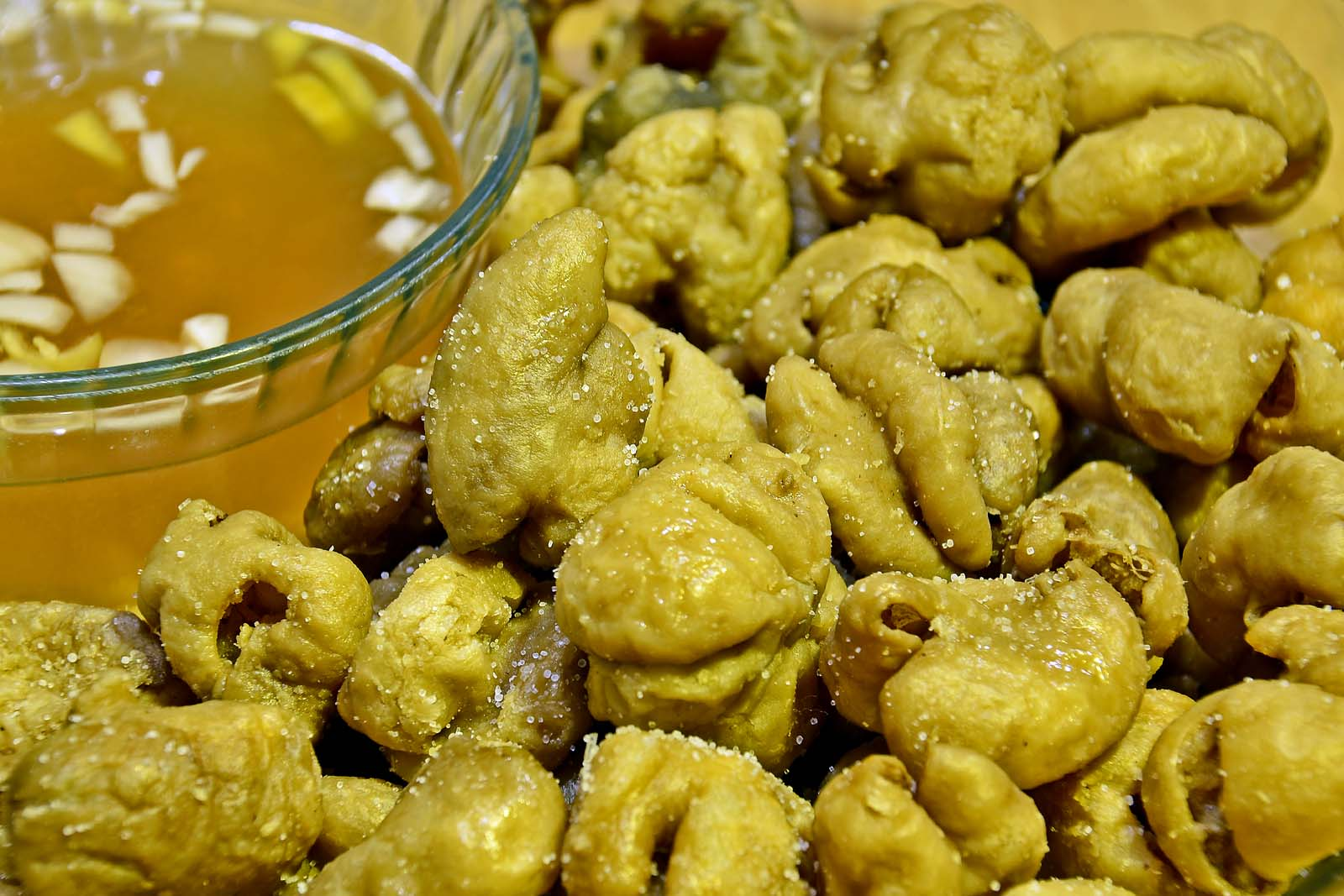
Chicharon, crispy pork rinds or fried snacks.

Deep-fried pulutan include chicharon (less commonly spelled tsitsaron), pork rinds that have been boiled and then twice fried, the second frying gives the crunchiness and golden color; chicharong bituka, pig intestines that have been deep-fried to a crisp; chicharong bulaklak, similar to chicharong bituka it is made from mesenteries of pig intestines and has an appearance roughly resembling a flower, hence the bulaklak name; and chicharong manok, chicken skin that has been deep fried until crisp. Other examples of deep-fried pulutan are crispy crablets, crispy frog legs, chicharong isda or fish skin cracklings, and tugnas or deep-fried pork fat (also known as pinaigi).

Examples of grilled foods include isaw, or chicken or pig intestines skewered and then grilled; inihaw na tenga, pig ears that have been skewered and then grilled; and pork barbecue, skewered pork marinated in a sweet soy-garlic blend and then grilled. There is also sisig, a popular pulutan made from the pig's cheek skin, ears, and liver that is initially boiled, then charcoal-grilled and afterwards minced and cooked with chopped onions, chillies, and spices.

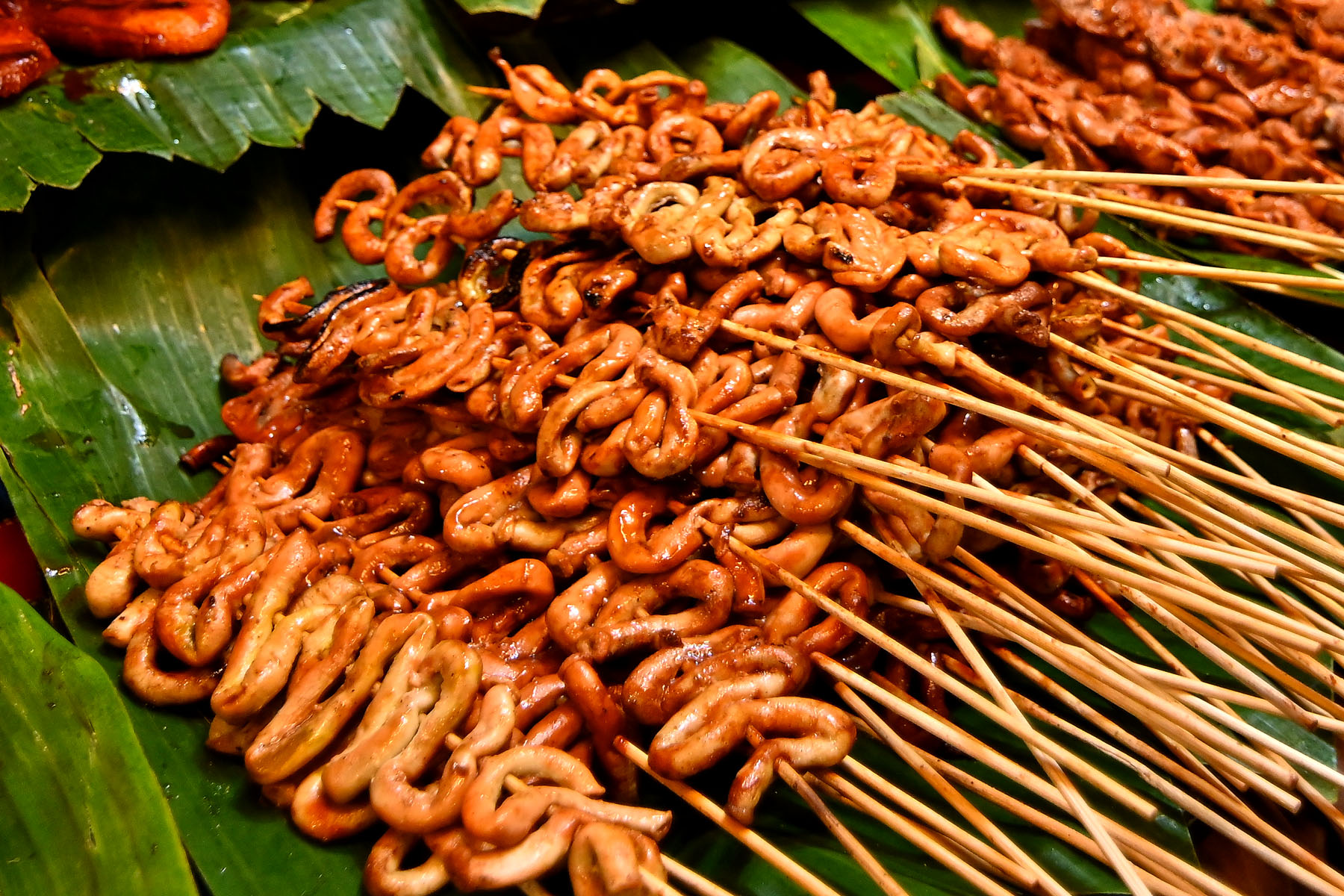
Isaw, a grilled chicken intestine skewers.

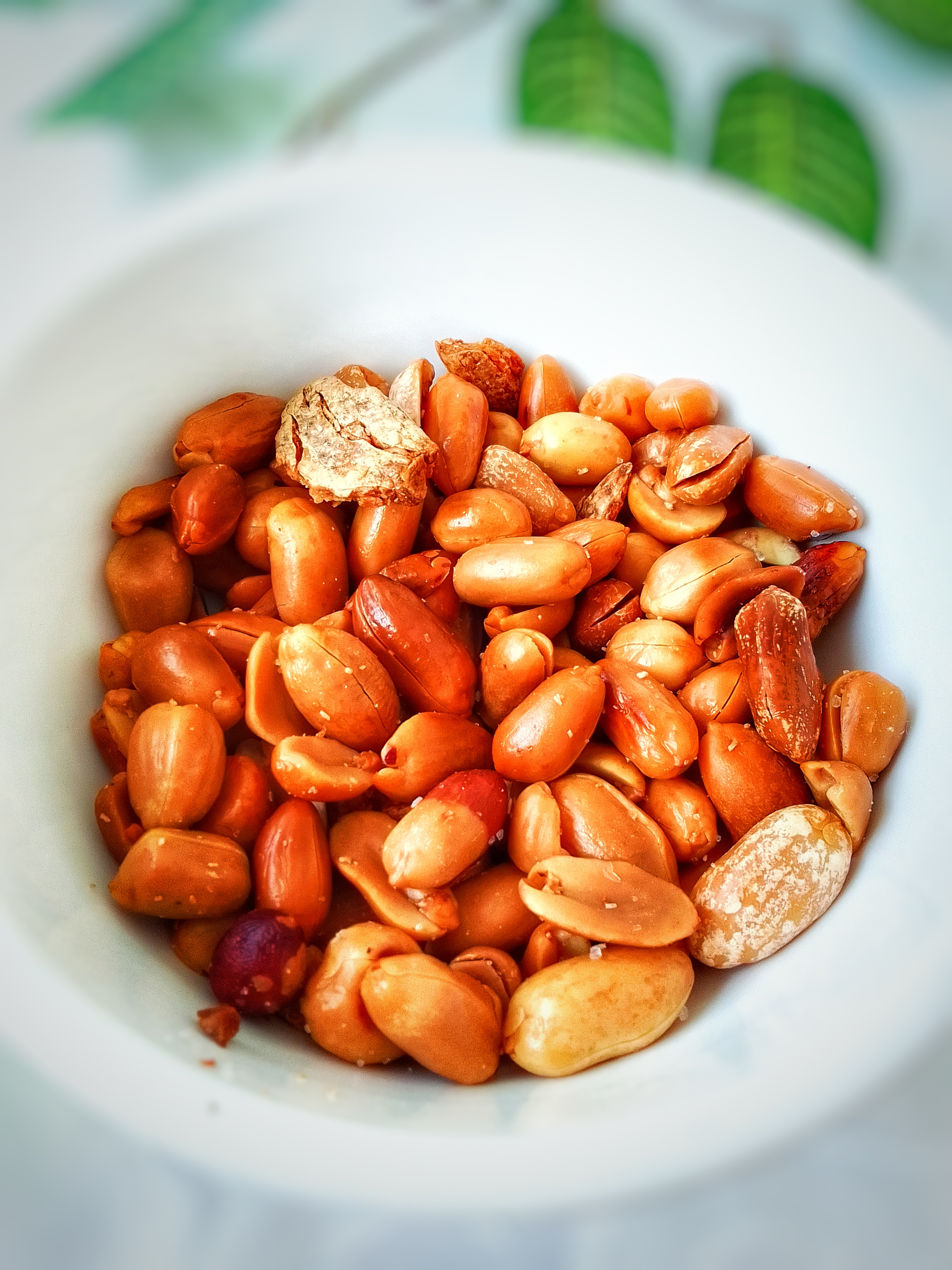
Adobong mani, slow-fried Filipino peanuts seasoned with garlic and salt.

Smaller snacks such as mani (peanuts) are often sold steamed in the shell, salted, spiced, or flavored with garlic by street vendors in the Philippines. Another snack is kropeck, fish crackers.

Tokwa't baboy is fried tofu with boiled pork marinated in a garlic-flavored soy sauce or vinegar dip. It is also served as a side dish to pancit luglog or pancit palabok.

Also, tuhog-tuhog is accompanied by sweet or spicy sauce. This includes fish balls, kikiam, squid balls, and other snacks.

=== Fiesta food ===
For festive occasions, people band together and prepare more sophisticated dishes. Tables are often laden with expensive and labor-intensive treats requiring hours of preparation. In Filipino celebrations, lechon (less commonly spelled litson) serves as the centerpiece of the dinner table. It is usually a whole roasted pig, but suckling pigs (lechonillo, or lechon de leche) or cattle calves (lechong baka) can also be prepared in place of the popular adult pig. It is typically served with lechon sauce, which is traditionally made from the roasted pig's liver.

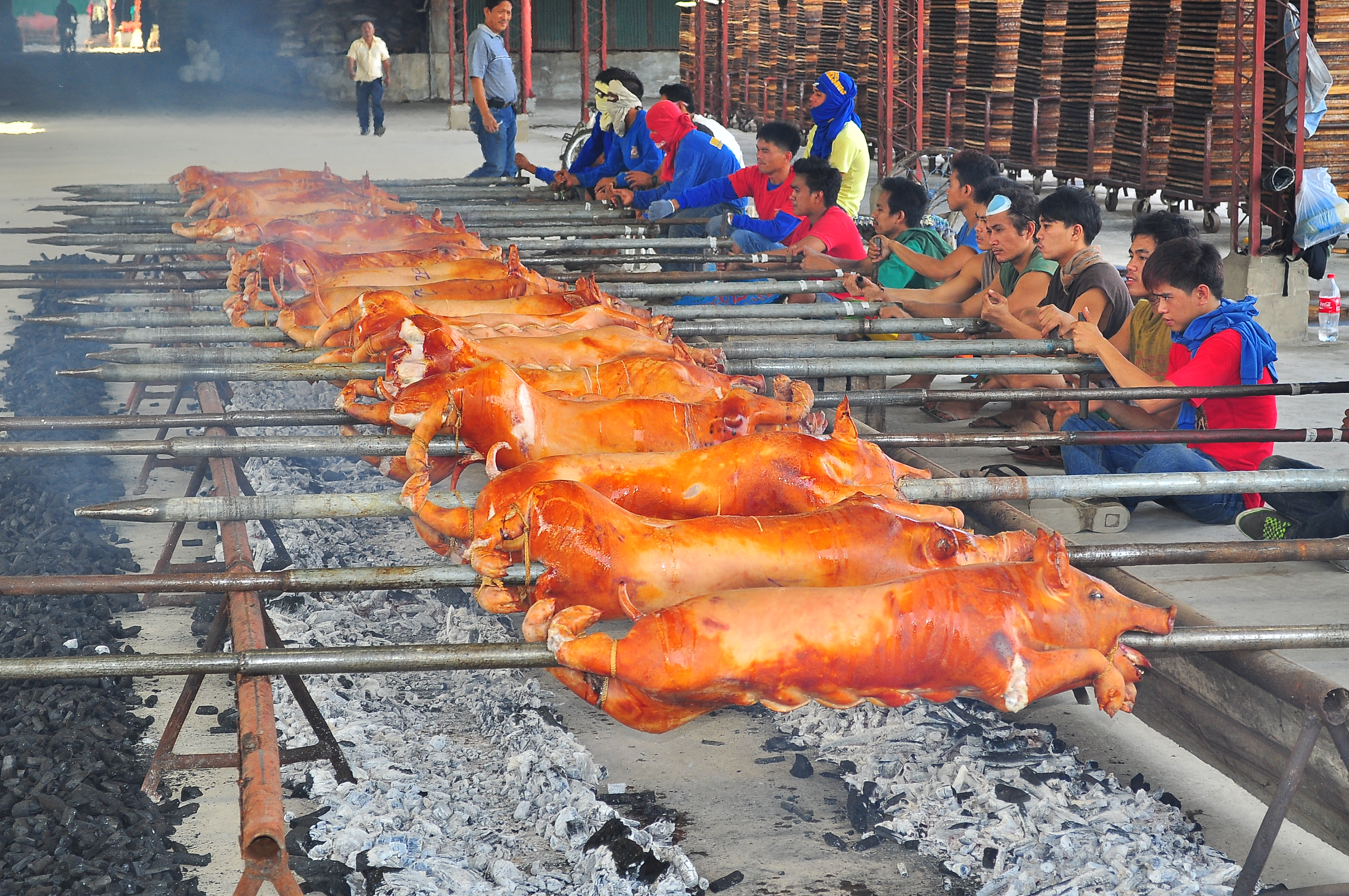
Lechón, a roasted pig commonly served during Filipino fiestas.

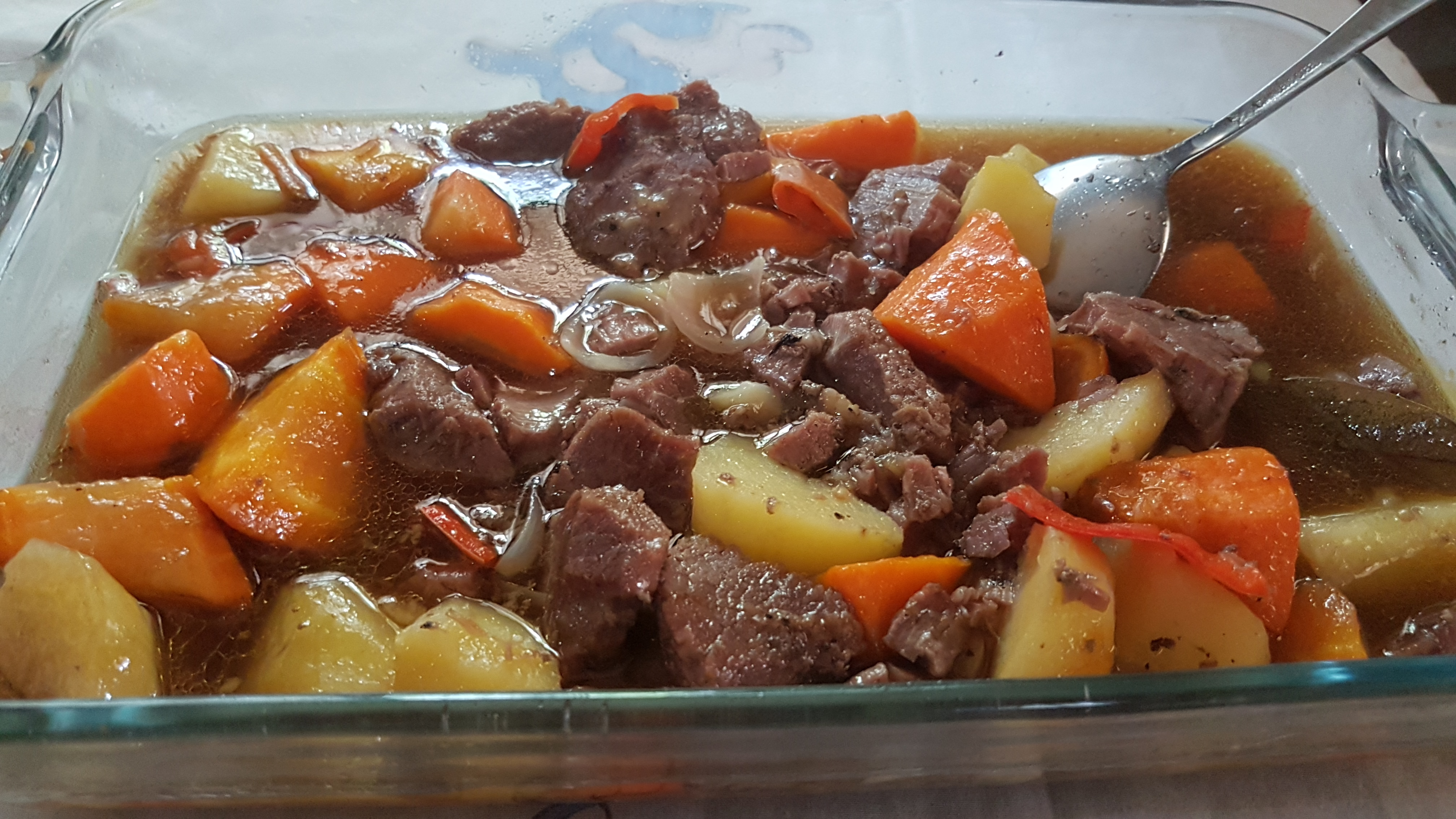
Mechado, a beef stew or roulade cooked in a tomato-based sauce.

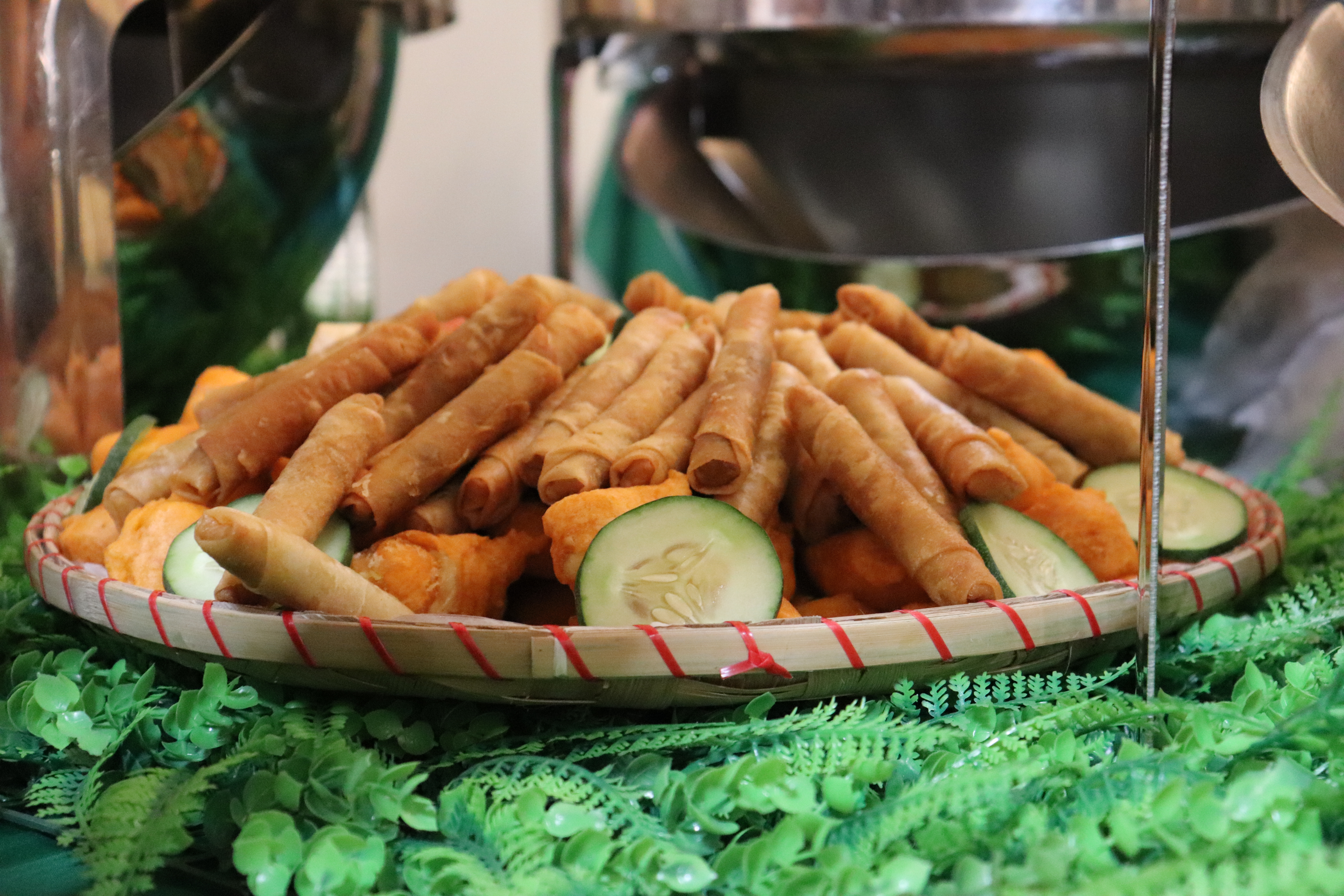
Lumpiang Shanghai, a deep-fried spring rolls typically filled with ground pork and vegetables.

Other dishes include hamonado (honey-cured beef, pork or chicken), relleno (stuffed chicken or milkfish), mechado, afritada, caldereta, puchero, paella, menudo, morcon, embutido (referring to a meatloaf dish, not a sausage as understood elsewhere), suman (a savory rice and coconut milk concoction steamed in leaves such as banana), and pancit canton.

The table may also have various sweets and pastries such as leche flan, ube, sapin-sapin, sorbetes (ice cream), totong or sinukmani (a rice, coconut milk and mongo bean pudding), ginataan (a coconut milk pudding with various root vegetables and tapioca pearls), and gulaman (an agar jello-like ingredient or dessert).

Christmas Eve, known as Noche Buena, is the most important feast. During this evening, the star of the table is the Christmas ham and Edam cheese (queso de bola). Supermarkets are laden with these treats during the Christmas season and are popular giveaways by Filipino companies in addition to red wine, brandy, groceries, or pastries. Available mostly during the Christmas season and sold in front of churches along with bibingka, puto bumbong is purple colored ground sticky rice steamed vertically in small bamboo tubes.

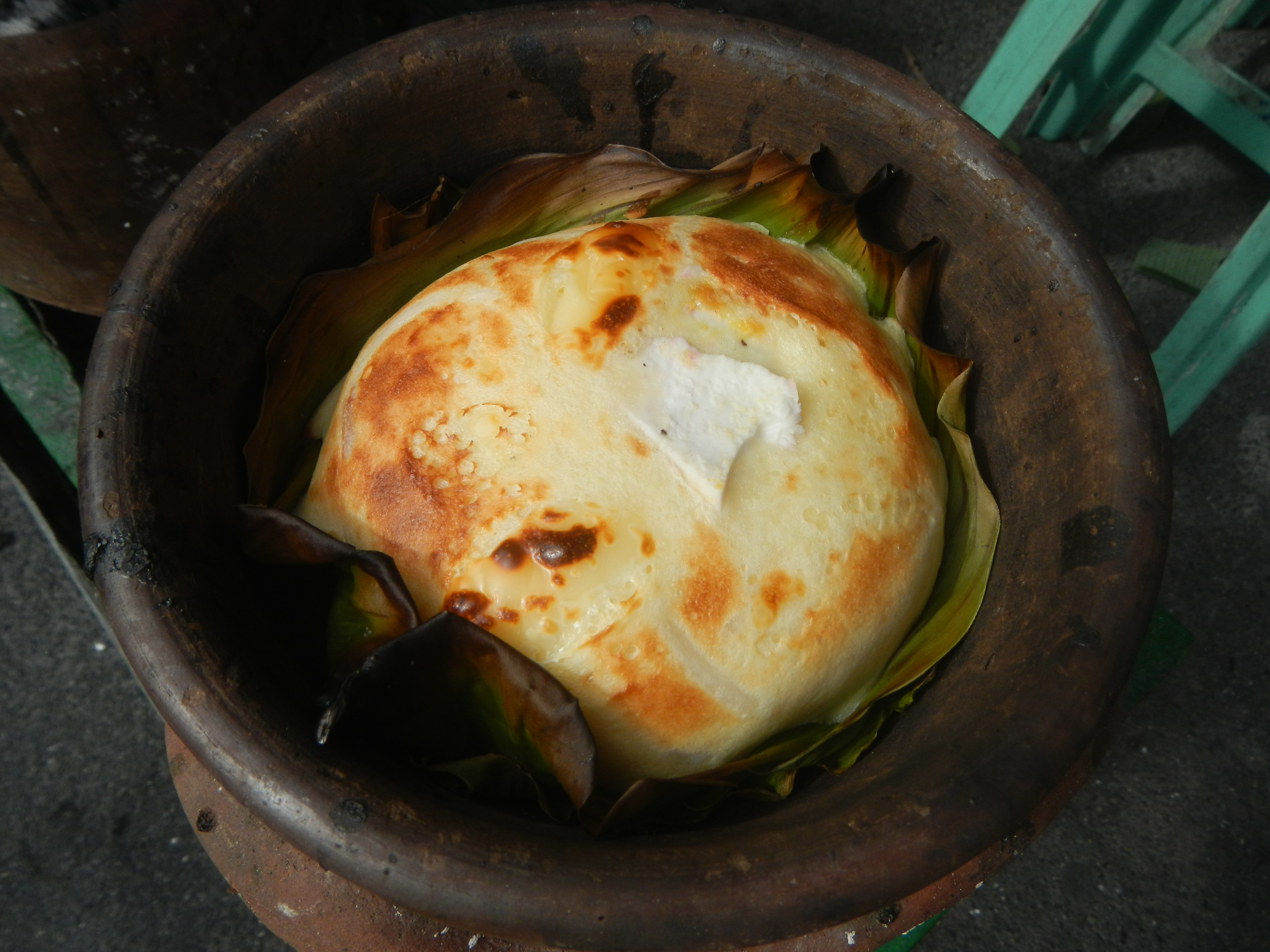
Bibingka, a rice cake typically baked in clay pots lined with banana leaves.

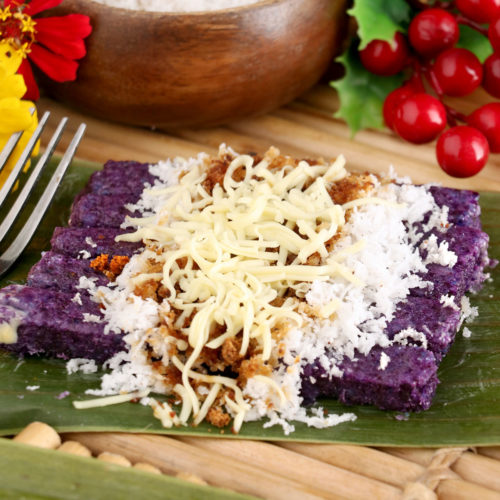
Puto bumbong, a purple rice cake traditionally served during Christmas.

More common at celebrations than in everyday home meals, lumpiang sariwa, or fresh lumpia, is a fresh spring roll that consists of a soft crepe wrapped around a filling that can include strips of kamote (sweet potato), singkamas (jicama), bean sprouts, green beans, cabbage, carrots and meat (often pork).

It can be served warm or cold and typically with a sweet peanut and garlic sauce. Ukoy is shredded papaya combined with small shrimp (and occasionally bean sprouts) and fried to make shrimp patties. It is often eaten with vinegar seasoned with garlic, salt and pepper. Both lumpiang sariwa and ukoy are often served together in Filipino parties. Lumpiang sariwa has Chinese origins, having been derived from popiah.

== Staples ==
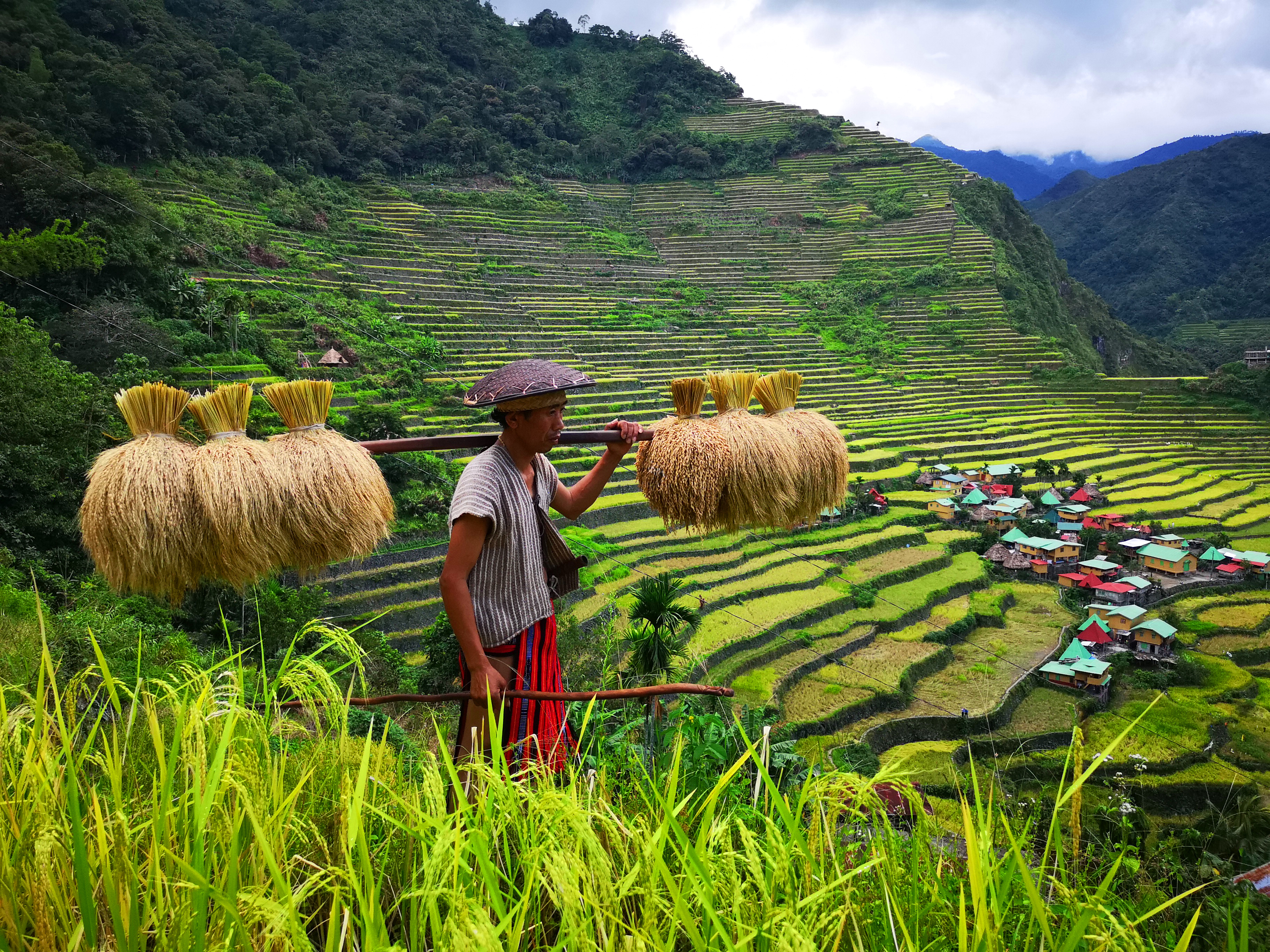
Rice is the staple food in Filipino cuisine.

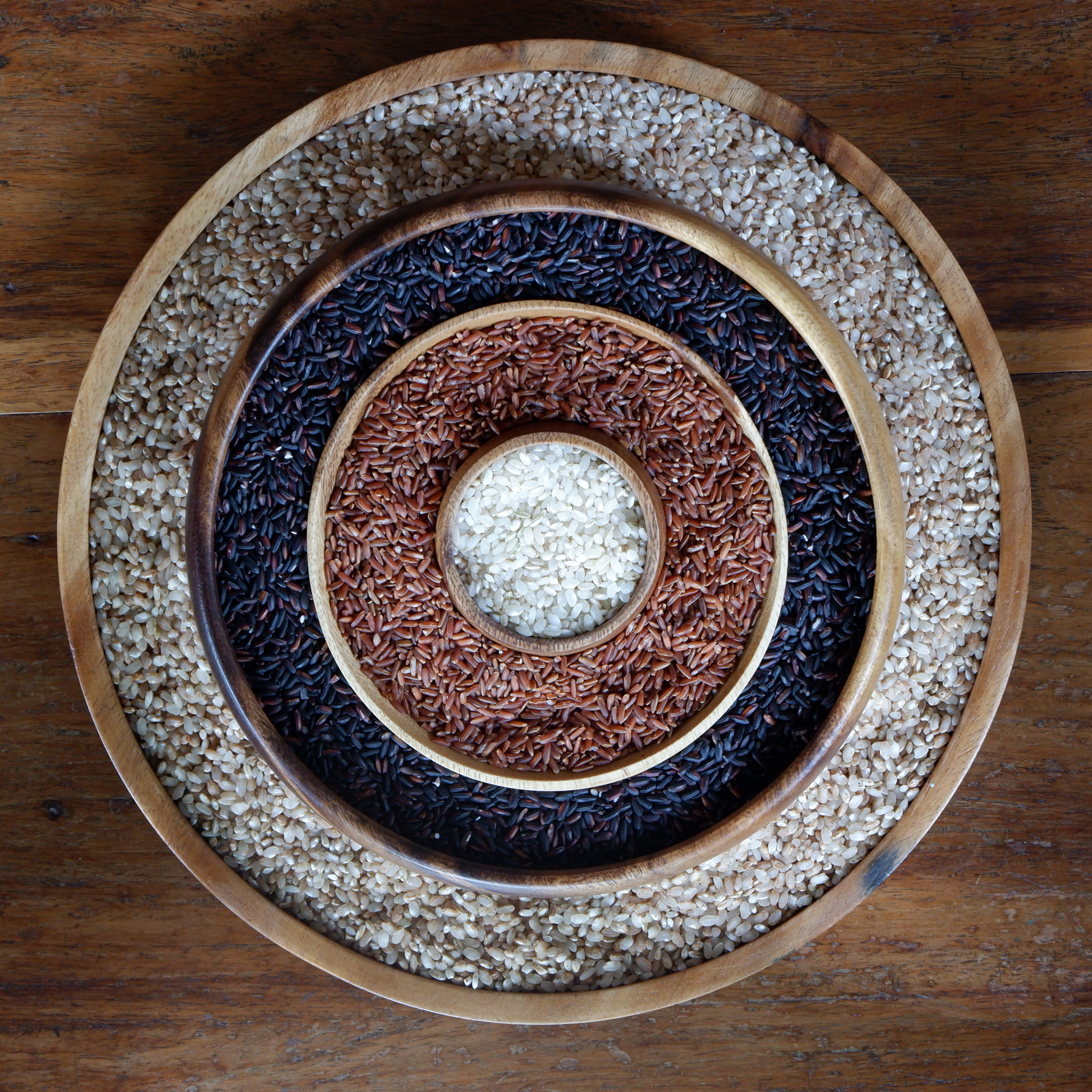
Filipino Cordilleran heirloom rice, traditionally grown in the mountainous regions of the Philippines.

As in most Asian countries, the staple food in the Philippines is rice. It is most often steamed and always served with meat, fish and vegetable dishes. Leftover rice is often fried with garlic to make sinangag, which is usually served at breakfast together with a fried egg and cured meat or sausages. Rice is often eaten with the sauce or broth from the main dishes. In some regions, rice is mixed with salt, condensed milk, cocoa, or coffee. Rice flour is used in making sweets, cakes and other pastries. Sticky rice with cocoa, also called champorado is also a common dish served with daing (dried herring).

Rice and coconuts as staples throughout the archipelago as in the rest of Southeast Asia meant similar or adopted dishes and methods based on these crops. Some of these are evident in the infusion of coconut milk particularly in the renowned laing and sinilihan (popularized as Bicol express) of Bicol. Other regional variants of stews or soups commonly tagged as ginataan(g) or "with coconut milk" also abound Filipino kitchens and food establishments. A dish from the Visayas simmered in coconut water, ideally in bamboo, is the binakol usually with chicken as the main ingredient.

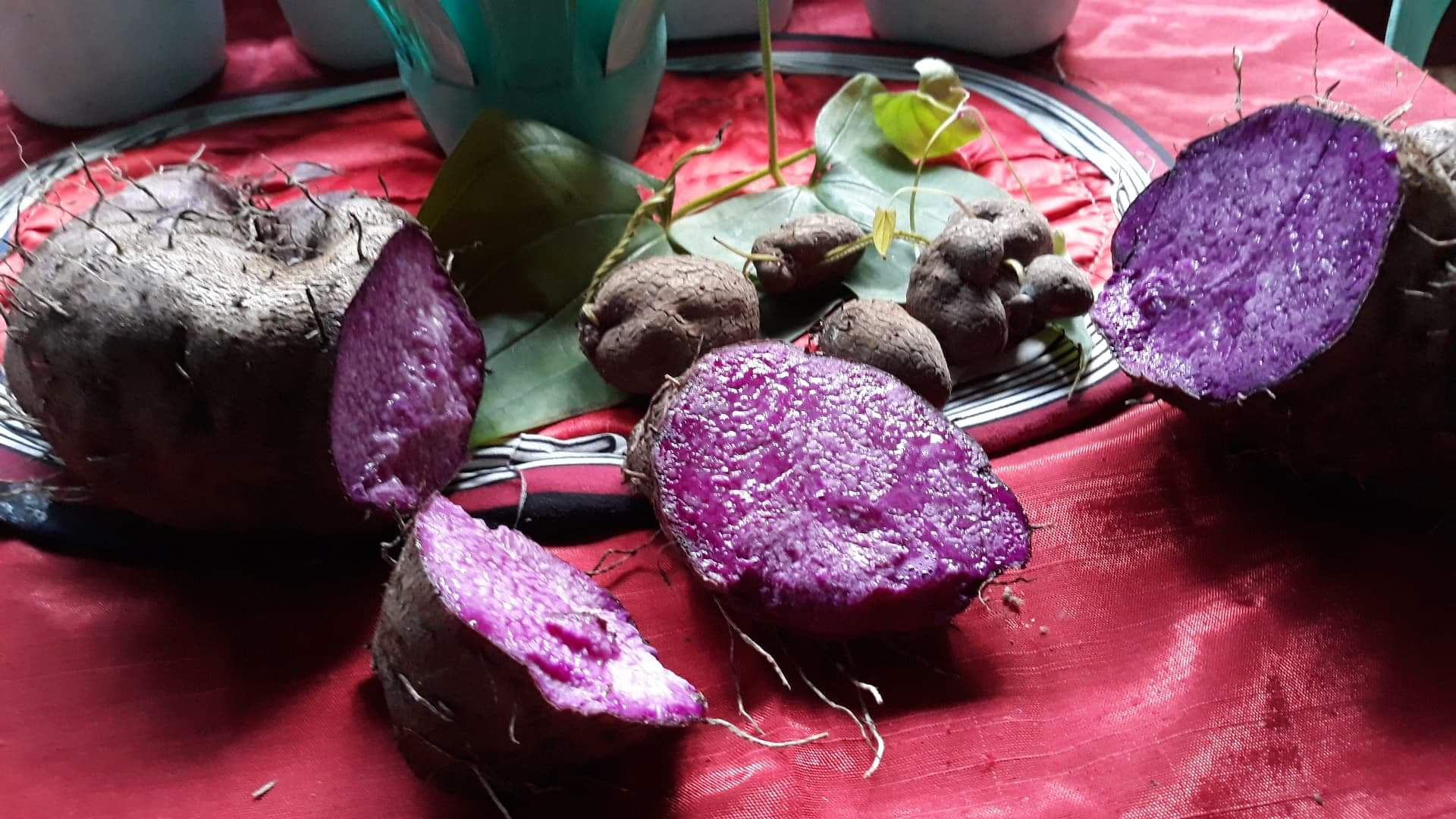
Ube, a staple ingredient in Filipino desserts.

A variety of fruits and vegetables are often used in cooking. Plantains (also called saba in Filipino), kalamansi, guavas (bayabas), mangoes, papayas, and pineapples lend a distinctly tropical flair in many dishes, but mainstay green leafy vegetables like water spinach (kangkong), Chinese cabbage (petsay), Napa cabbage (petsay wombok), cabbage (repolyo) and other vegetables like eggplants (talong) and yard-long beans (sitaw) are just as commonly used. Coconuts are ubiquitous. Coconut meat is often used in desserts, coconut milk (kakang gata) in sauces, and coconut oil for frying. Abundant harvests of root crops like potatoes, carrots, taro (gabi), cassava (kamoteng kahoy), purple yam (ube), and sweet potato (kamote) make them readily available. The combination of tomatoes (kamatis), garlic (bawang), and onions (sibuyas) is found in many dishes.

Meat staples include chicken, pork, beef, and fish. Seafood is popular as a result of the bodies of water surrounding the archipelago. Popular catches include tilapia, catfish (hito), milkfish (bangus), grouper (lapu-lapu), shrimp (hipon), prawns (sugpo), mackerel (galunggong, hasa-hasa), swordfish (isdang-ispada), oysters (talaba), mussels (tahong), clams (halaan and tulya), large and small crabs (alimango and alimasag respectively), game fish, sablefish, tuna, cod (bakalaw), blue marlin, and squid/cuttlefish (both called pusit). Also popular are seaweeds (damong dagat), abalone, and eel (igat).

The most common way of having fish is to have it salted, pan-fried or deep-fried, and then eaten as a simple meal with rice and vegetables. It may also be cooked in a sour broth of tomatoes or tamarind as in pangat, prepared with vegetables and a souring agent to make sinigang, simmered in vinegar and peppers to make paksiw, or roasted over hot charcoal or wood (inihaw). Other preparations include escabeche (sweet and sour), relleno (deboned and stuffed), or "kinilaw" (similar to ceviche; marinated in vinegar or kalamansi). Fish can be preserved by being smoked (tinapa) or sun-dried (tuyo or daing).

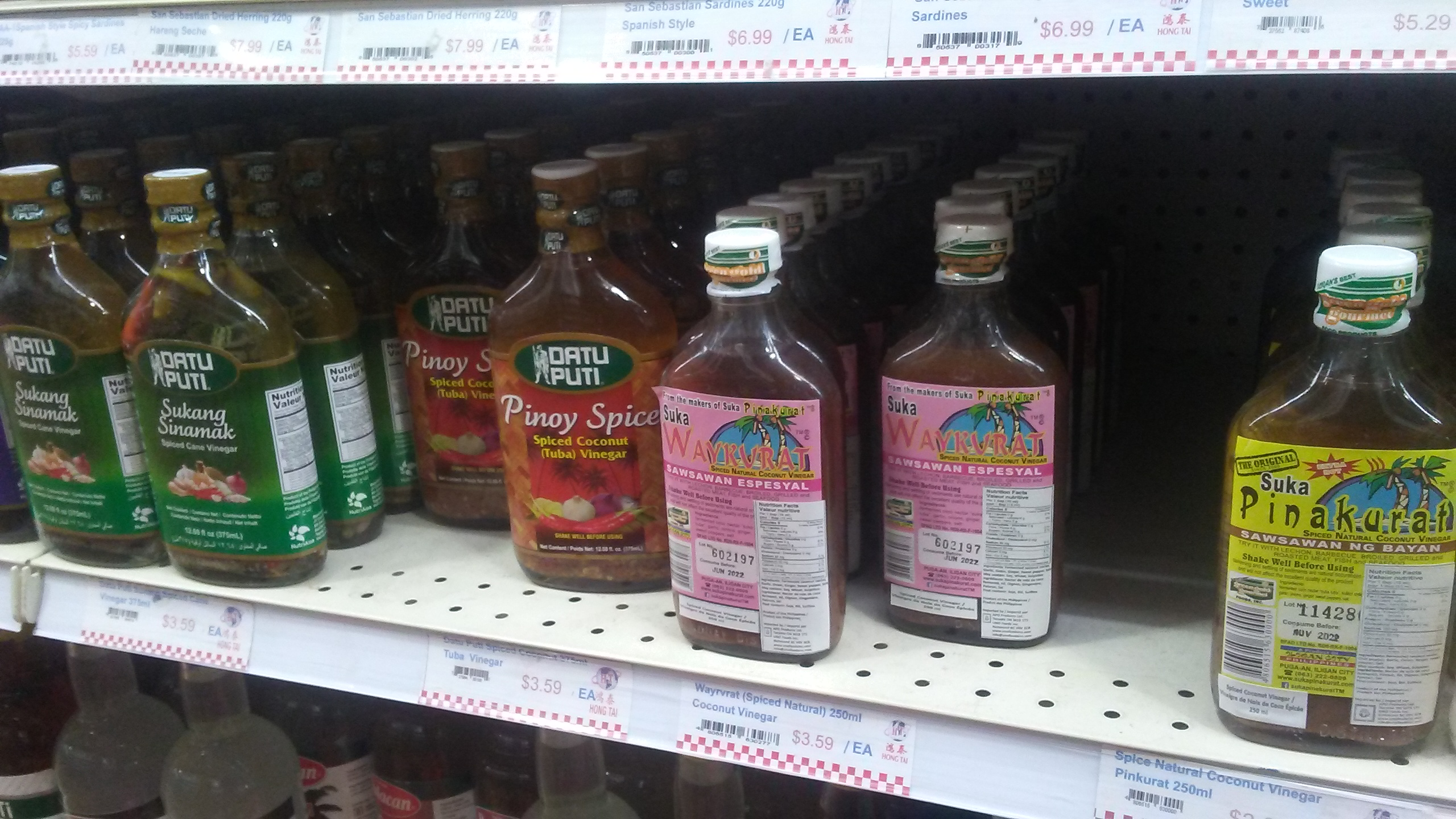
Filipino spiced vinegars, commonly used as condiments and dipping sauces.

Food is often served with various dipping sauces. Fried food is often dipped either in vinegar with onions, soy sauce with juice squeezed from kalamansi (Philippine lime or calamansi). Patis (fish sauce) may be mixed with kalamansi as dipping sauce for most seafood or mixed with a stew called nilaga. Fish sauce, fish paste (bagoong), shrimp paste (bagoong alamang) and crushed ginger root (luya) are condiments that are often added to dishes during the cooking process or when served.

== Dishes ==
=== Main dishes ===
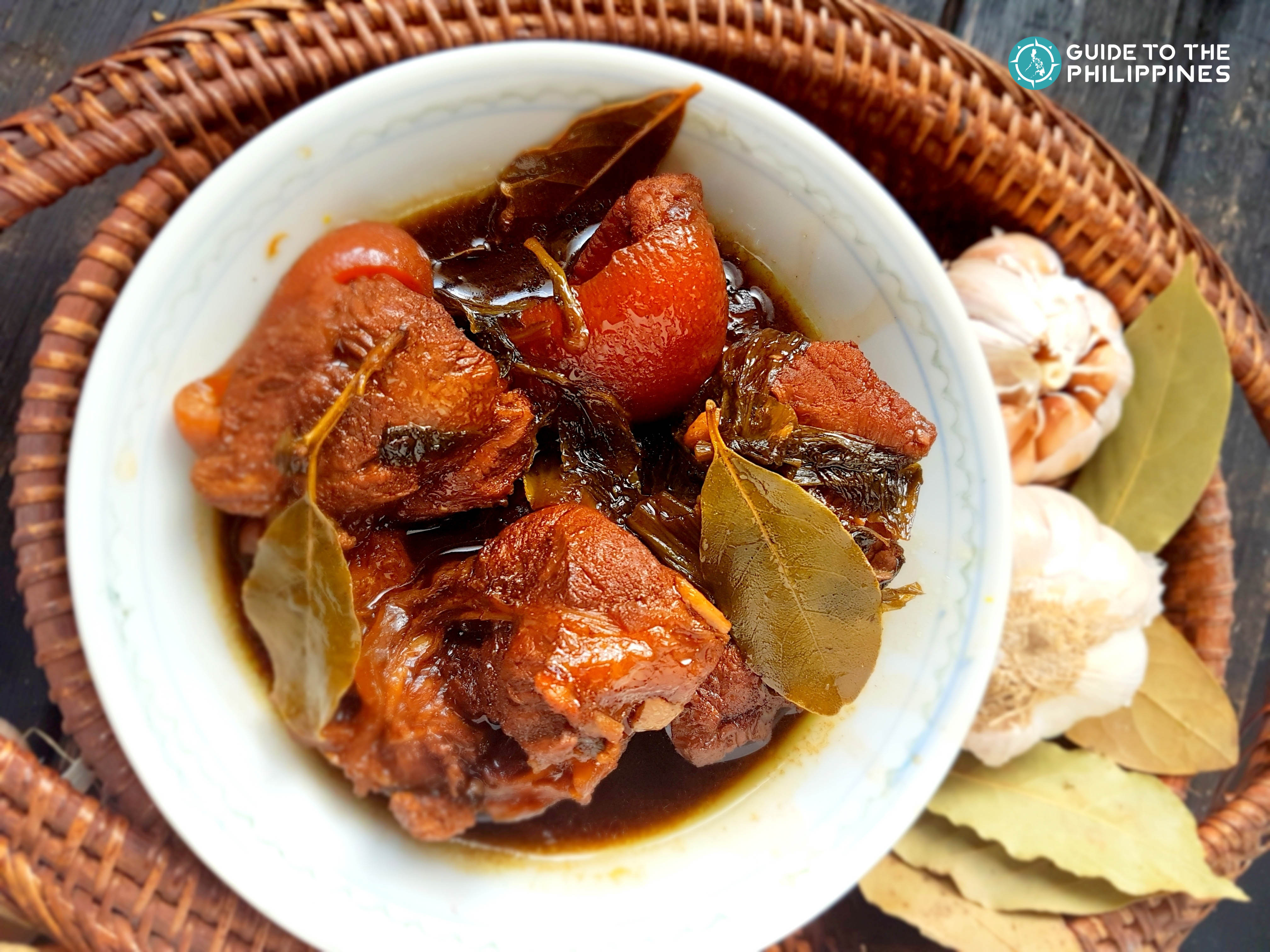
Adobo, a marinated and simmered in vinegar, soy sauce, garlic, and spices.

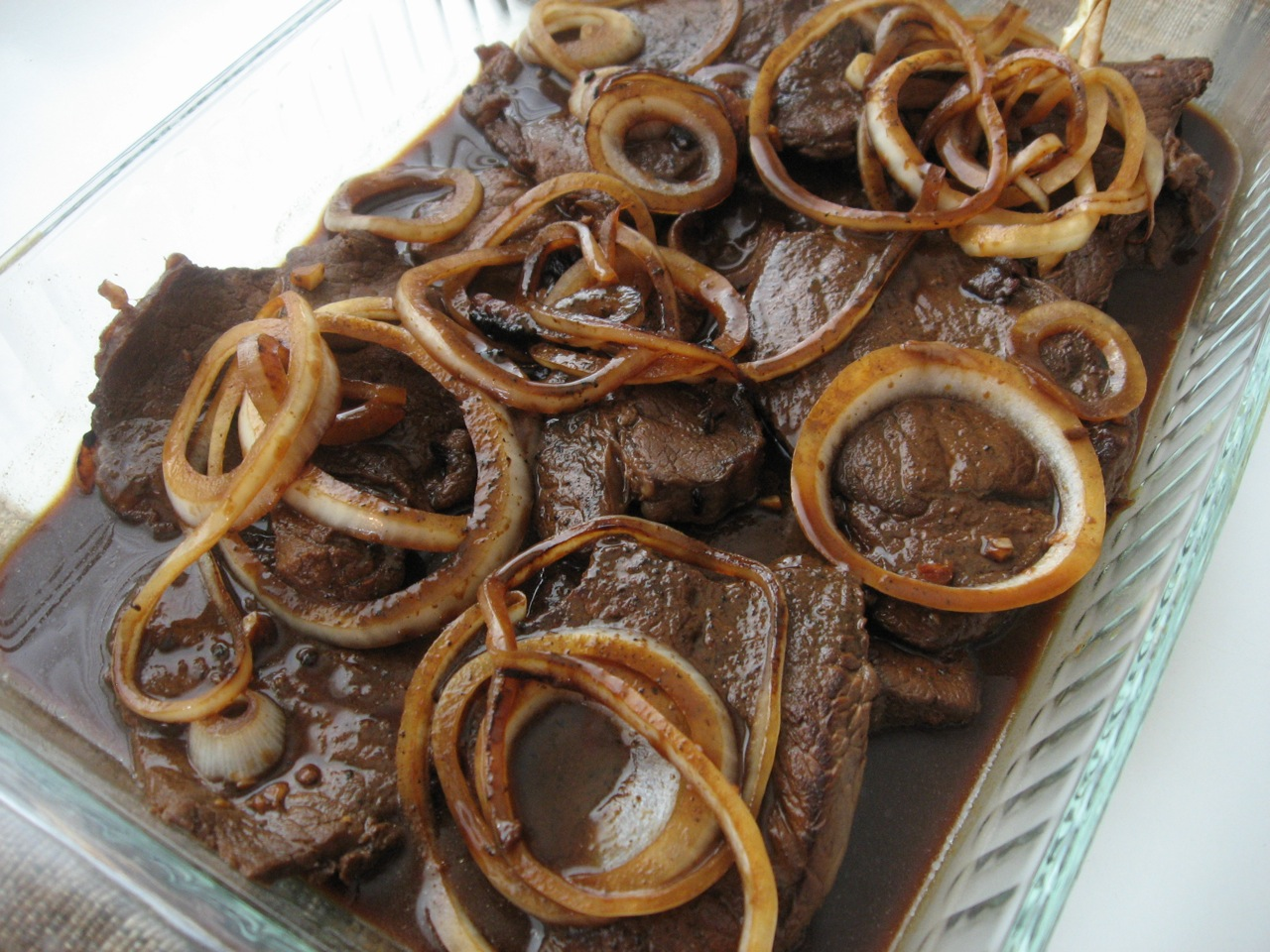
Bistek, strips of sirloin beef slowly cooked in soy sauce, calamansi juice, and onions.

Adobo is one of the most popular Filipino dishes and is considered by many to be the national dish. It usually consists of pork or chicken, sometimes both, stewed or braised in a sauce usually made from vinegar, cooking oil, garlic, bay leaf, peppercorns, and soy sauce. It can also be prepared "dry" by cooking out the liquid and concentrating the flavor. Bistek, also known as "Filipino beef steak", consists of thinly sliced beef marinated in soy sauce and calamansi and then fried in a skillet that is typically served with onions.

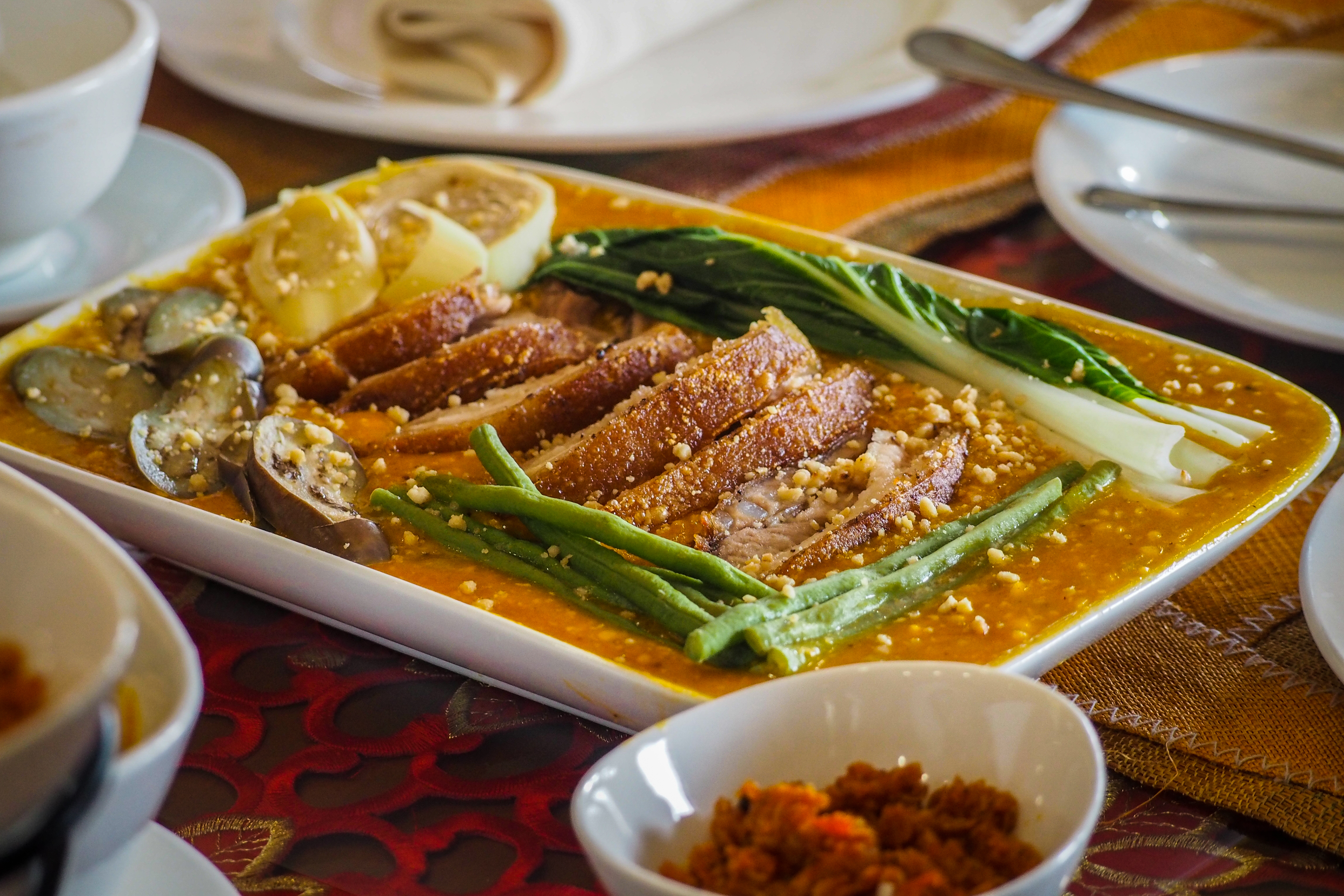
Kare kare, a peanut stew made with oxtail, and vegetables.

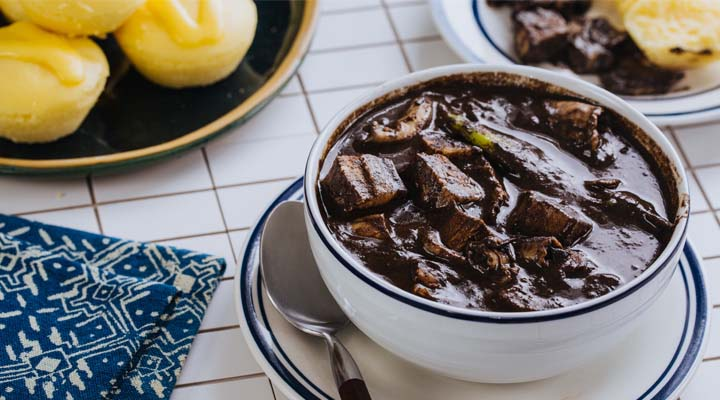
Dinuguan, a pork blood stew with puto.

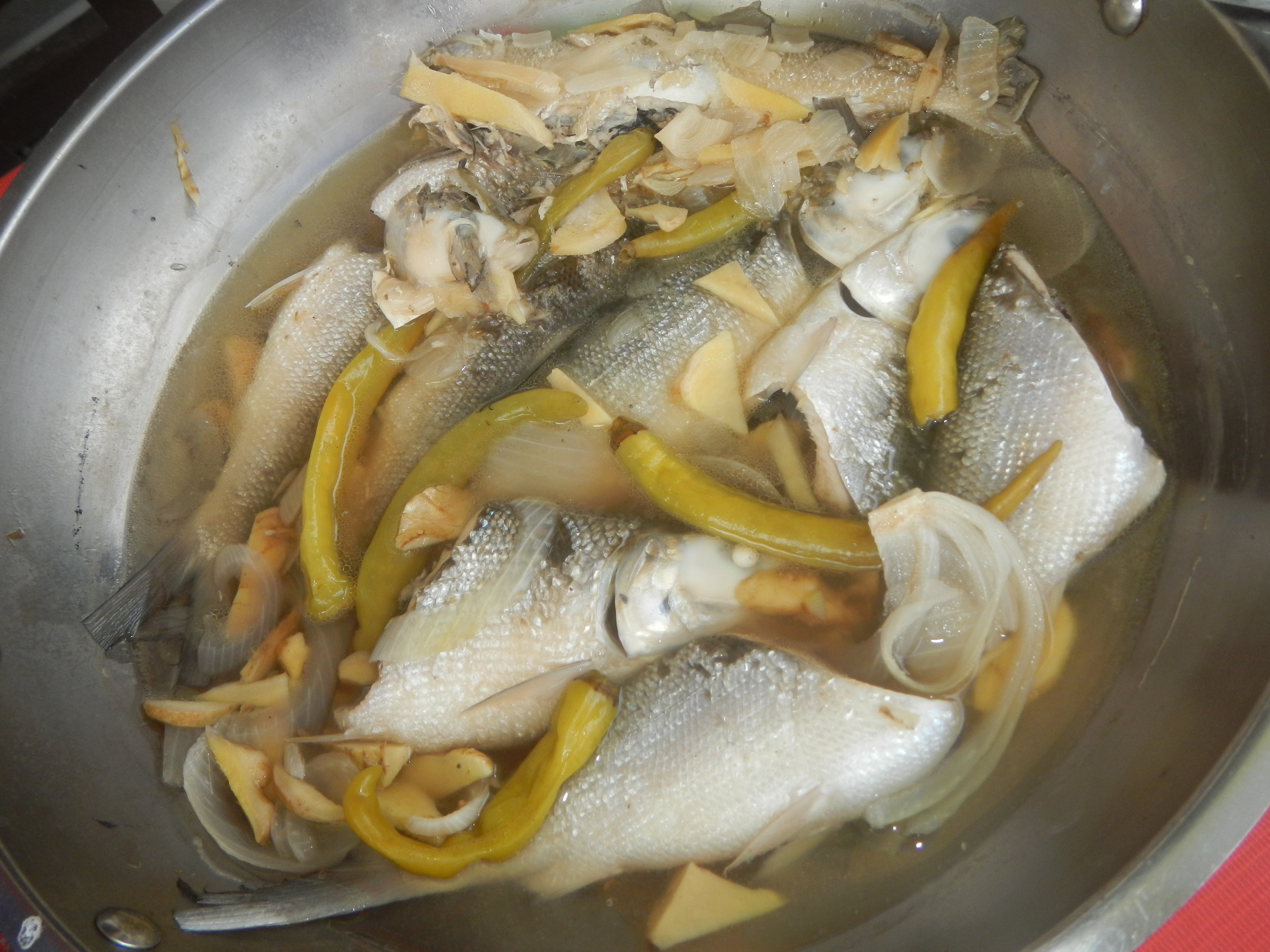
Paksiw, a dish of bangus simmered in vinegar and spices.

Some well-known stews are kare-kare and dinuguan. In kare-kare, also known as "peanut stew", oxtail or ox tripe is the main ingredient and is cooked with vegetables in a peanut-based preparation. It is typically served with bagoong (fermented shrimp paste). In dinuguan, pig's blood, entrails, and meat are cooked with vinegar and seasoned with chili peppers, usually siling mahaba.

Paksiw refers to different vinegar-based stews that differ greatly from one another based on the type of meat used. Paksiw na isda uses fish and usually includes the addition of ginger, fish sauce, and maybe siling mahaba and vegetables. Paksiw na baboy is a paksiw using pork, usually pork hocks, and often sees the addition of sugar, banana blossoms, and water so that the meat is stewed in a sweet sauce. A similar Visayan dish called humba adds fermented black beans. Both dishes are probably related to pata tim which is of Chinese origin. Paksiw na lechon is made from lechon meat and features the addition of ground liver or liver spread. This adds flavor and thickens the sauce so that it starts to caramelize around the meat by the time dish is finished cooking. Although some versions of paksiw dishes are made using the same basic ingredients as adobo, they are prepared differently, with other ingredients added and the proportions of ingredients and water being different.

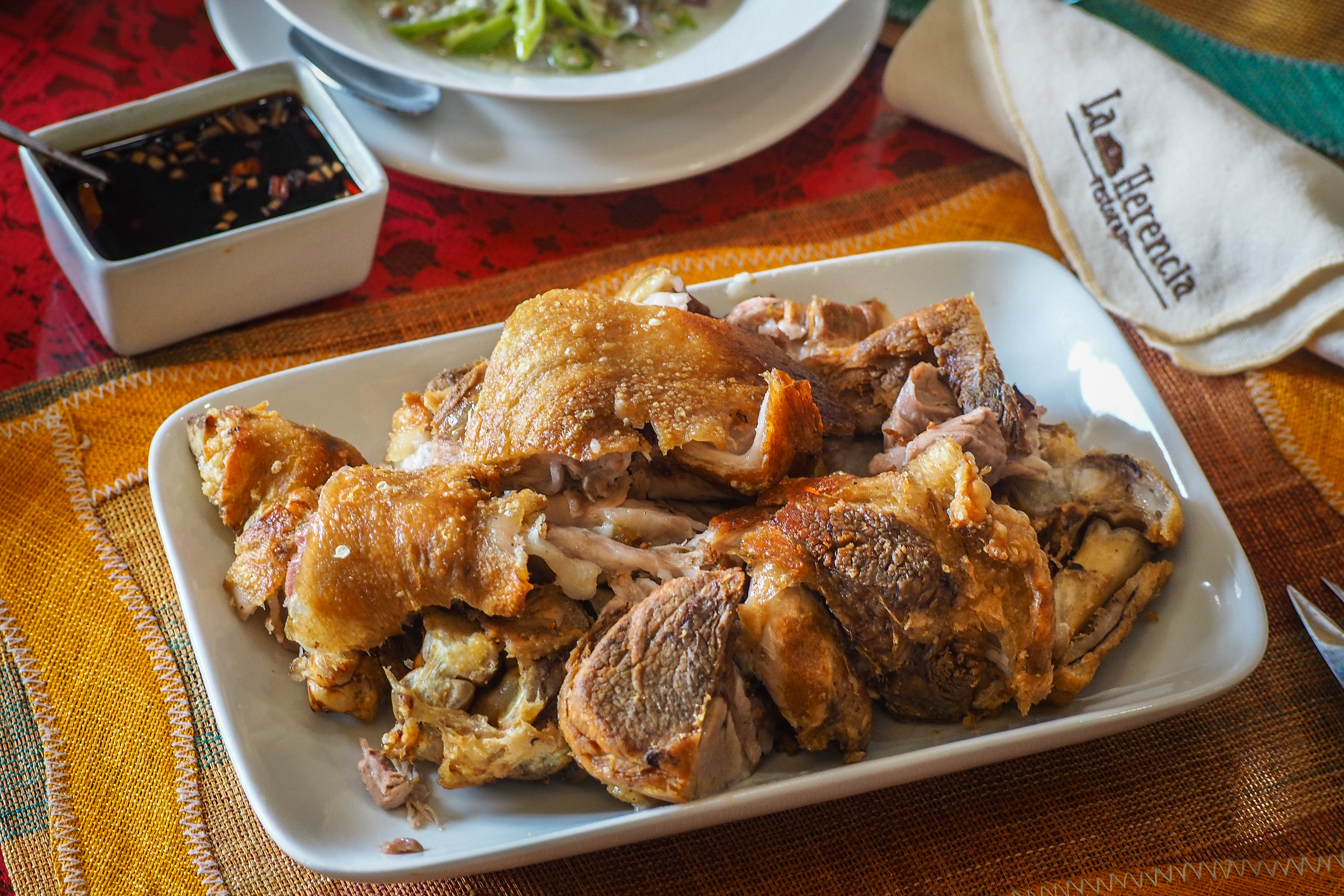
Crispy pata, deep-fried pork leg known for its crispy skin and tender meat.

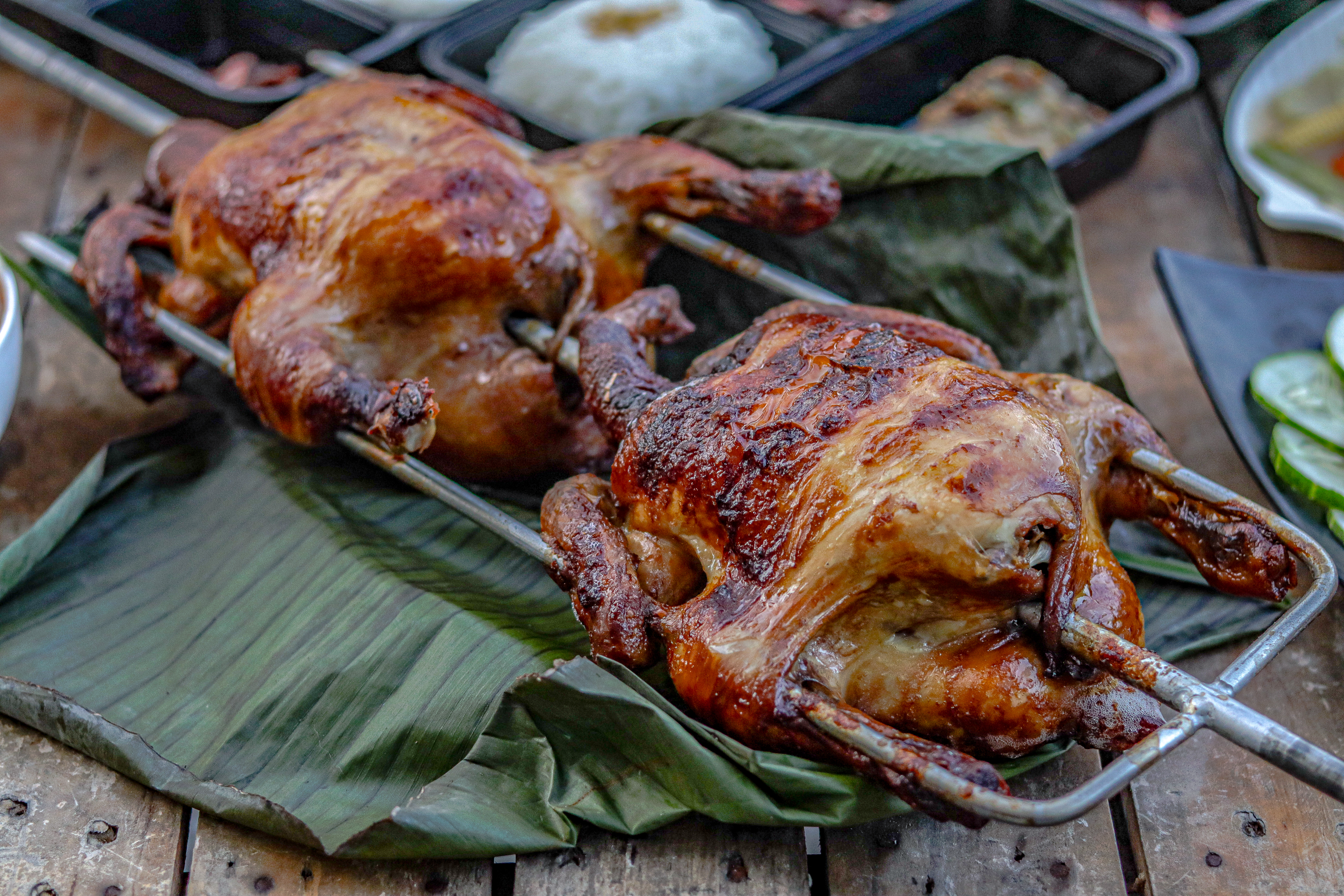
Lechon manok, a Filipino rotisserie chicken.

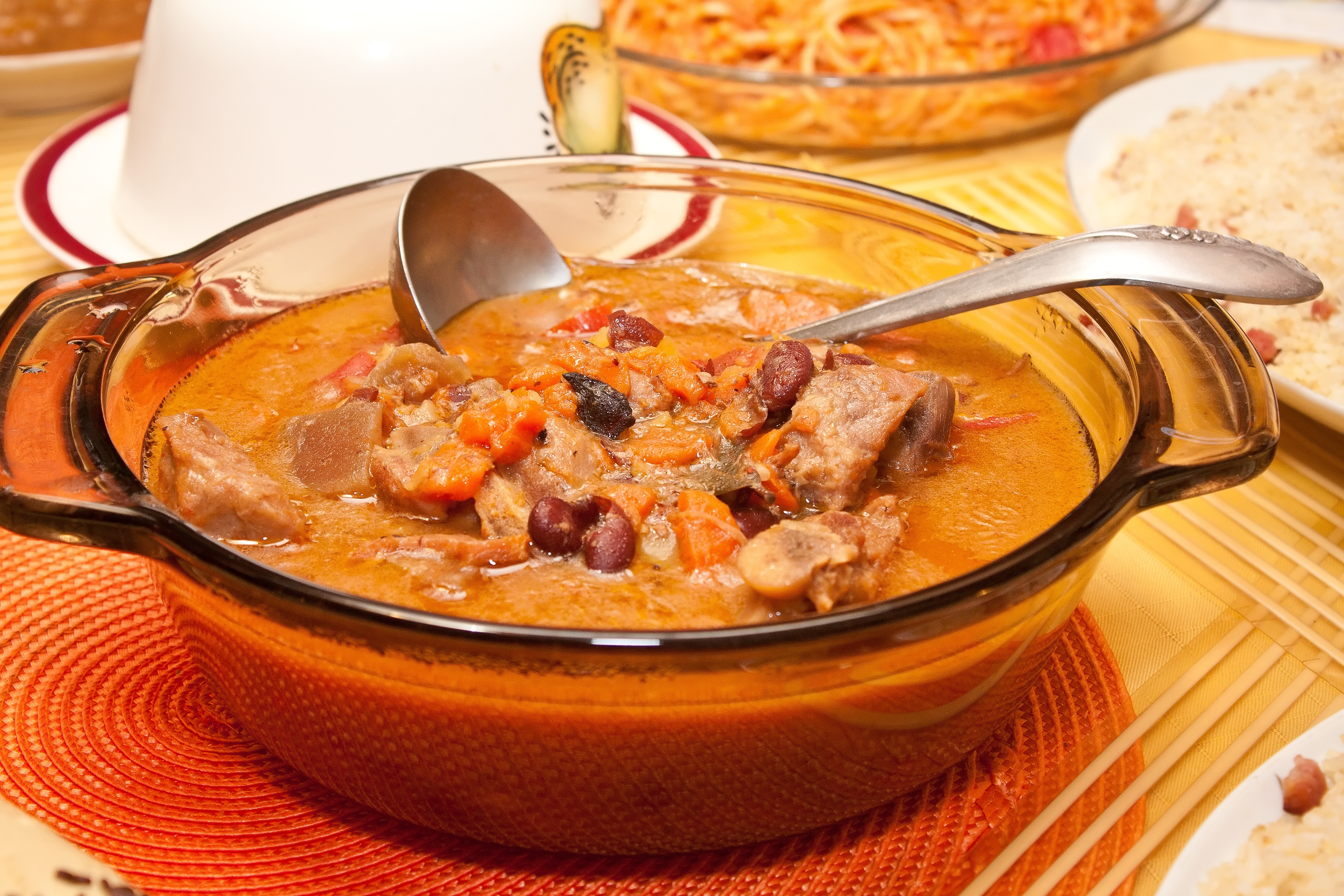
Kaldereta, a meat stew made with, vegetables, and a rich tomato-based sauce.

In crispy pata, pork knuckles (known as pata) are marinated in garlic-flavored vinegar then deep fried until crisp and golden brown, with other parts of the pork leg prepared in the same way. Lechon manok is the Filipino take on rotisserie chicken. Available in many hole-in-the-wall stands or restaurant chains (e.g. Andok's, Baliwag, Toto's Sr. Pedro's, G.S. Pagtakhan's), it is typically a specially seasoned chicken roasted over a charcoal flame served with "sarsa" or lechon sauce made from mashed pork liver, starch, sugar, and spices.

Mechado, kaldereta, and afritada are Spanish influenced tomato sauce-based dishes that are somewhat similar to one another. In these dishes meat is cooked in tomato sauce, minced garlic, and onions. Mechado gets its name from the pork fat that is inserted in a slab of beef making it look like a wick (mitsa) coming out of a beef "candle". The larded meat is then cooked in a seasoned tomato sauce and later sliced and served with the sauce it was cooked in.

Kaldereta can be beef but is also associated with goat. Chunks of meat are cooked in tomato sauce, minced garlic, chopped onions, peas, carrots, bell peppers and potatoes to make a stew with some recipes calling for the addition of soy sauce, fish sauce, vinegar, chilies, ground liver or some combination thereof.

Afritada tends to be the name given to the dish when chicken and pork is used. Another similar dish said to originate from the Rizal area is waknatoy. Pork or beef sirloin is combined with potatoes and cut sausages and cooked in a tomato-based sauce sweetened with pickles. Puchero is derived from the Spanish cocido; it is a sweeter stew that has beef and banana or plantain slices simmered in tomato sauce.

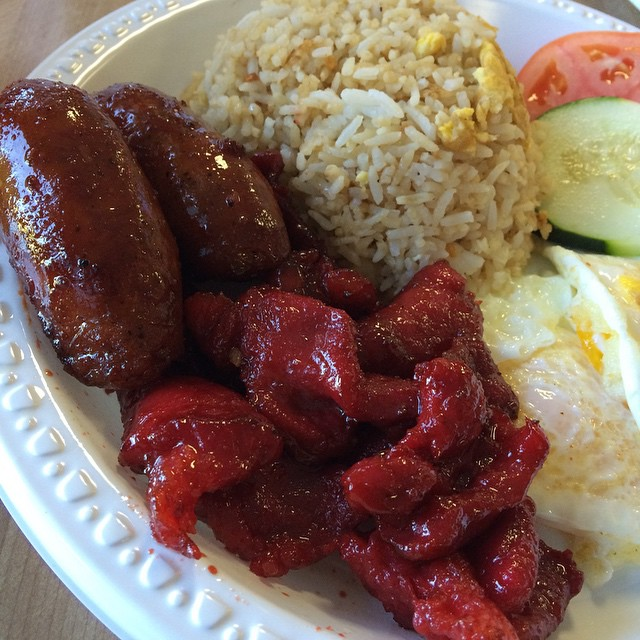
Tocino and Longganisa, Filipino cured meats commonly served for breakfast.

Filipinos also eat tocino and longganisa. Tocino is a sweetened cured meat made with either chicken or pork and is marinated and cured for a number of days before being fried. Longganisa is a sweet or spicy sausage, typically made from pork though other meats can also be used, and are often colored red traditionally through the use of the annatto seed but also artificial food coloring.

Filipino soups tend to be very hearty and stew-like containing large chunks of meat and vegetables or noodles. They are usually intended to be filling and not meant to be a light preparatory introduction for the main course. They tend to be served with the rest of the meal and eaten with rice when they are not meals unto themselves. They are often referred to on local menus under the heading sabaw (broth).

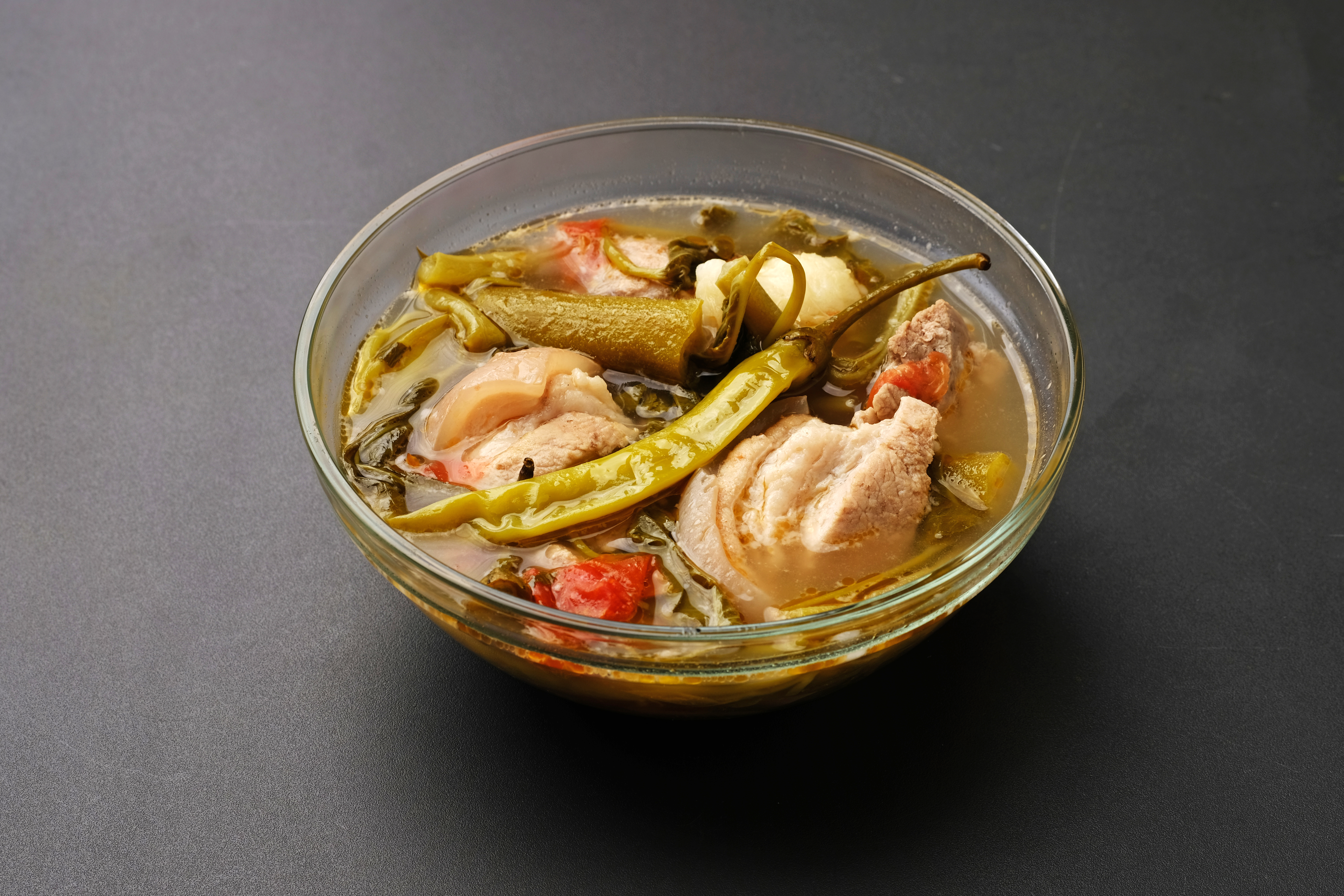
Sinigang, a sour soup made with vegetables, and typically flavored with tamarind.

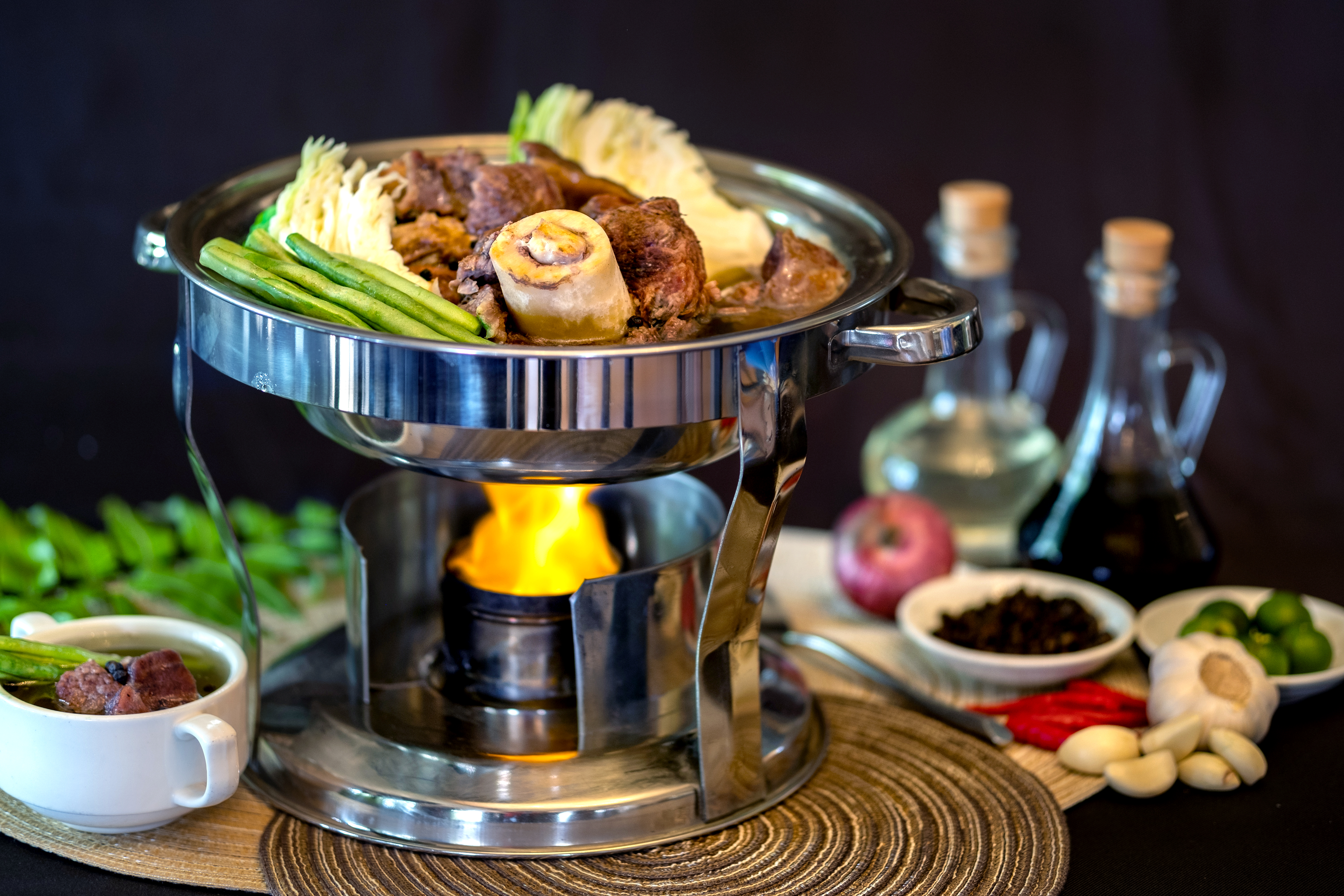
Bulalo, a beef shank soup with bone marrow, simmered until tender.

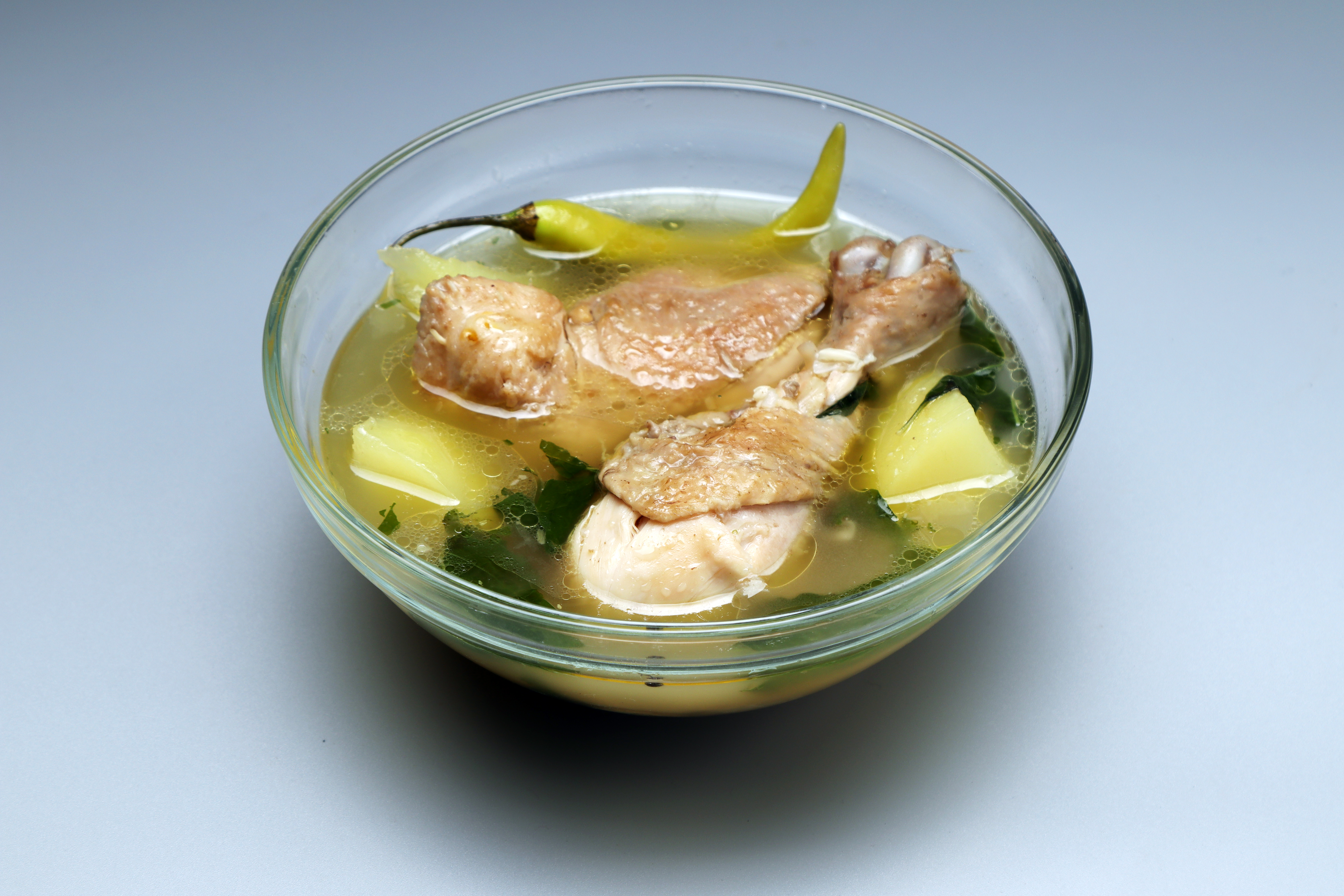
Tinola, a chicken soup simmered with ginger, green papaya/chayote, and leafy vegetables.

Sinigang is a popular dish in this category distinguished by its sourness that often vies with adobo for consideration as the national dish. It is typically made with either pork, beef, chicken or seafood and made sour with tamarind or other suitable souring ingredients. Some seafood variants for example can be made sour by the use of guava fruit or miso.

Another dish is tinola. It has large chicken pieces and green papaya/sayote slices cooked with chili, spinach, and moringa leaves in a ginger-flavored broth. Nilagang baka is a beef stew made with cabbages and other vegetables. Binacol is a warm chicken soup cooked with coconut water and served with strips of coconut meat.

La Paz batchoy is a noodle soup garnished with pork innards, crushed pork cracklings, chopped vegetables, and topped with a raw egg. Another dish with the same name uses misua, beef heart, kidneys and intestines, but does not contain eggs or vegetables. Mami is a noodle soup made from chicken, beef, pork, wonton dumplings, or intestines (called laman-loob). Ma Mon Luk was known for it.

Another chicken noodle soup is sotanghon, consisting of cellophane noodles (also called sotanghon and from whence the name of the dish is derived), chicken, and sometimes mushrooms.

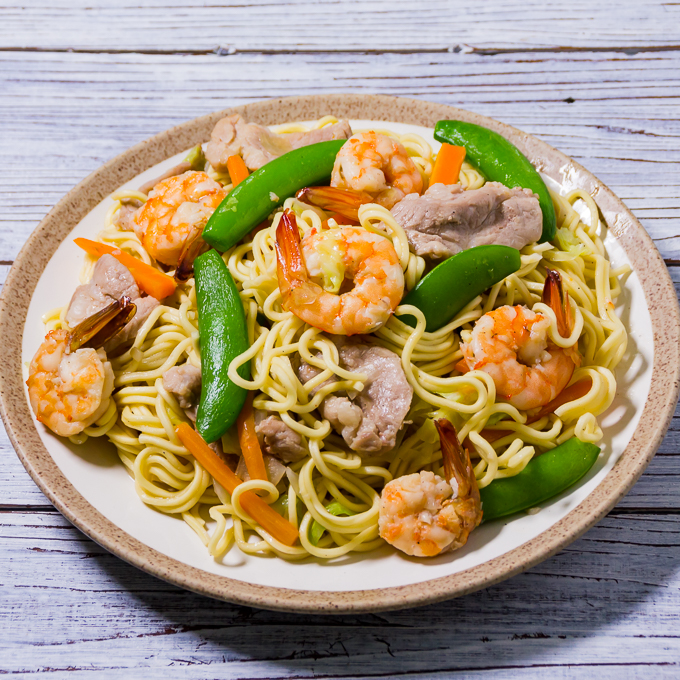
Pancit Canton, stir-fried egg noodle dish with vegetables, meat, and seafood.

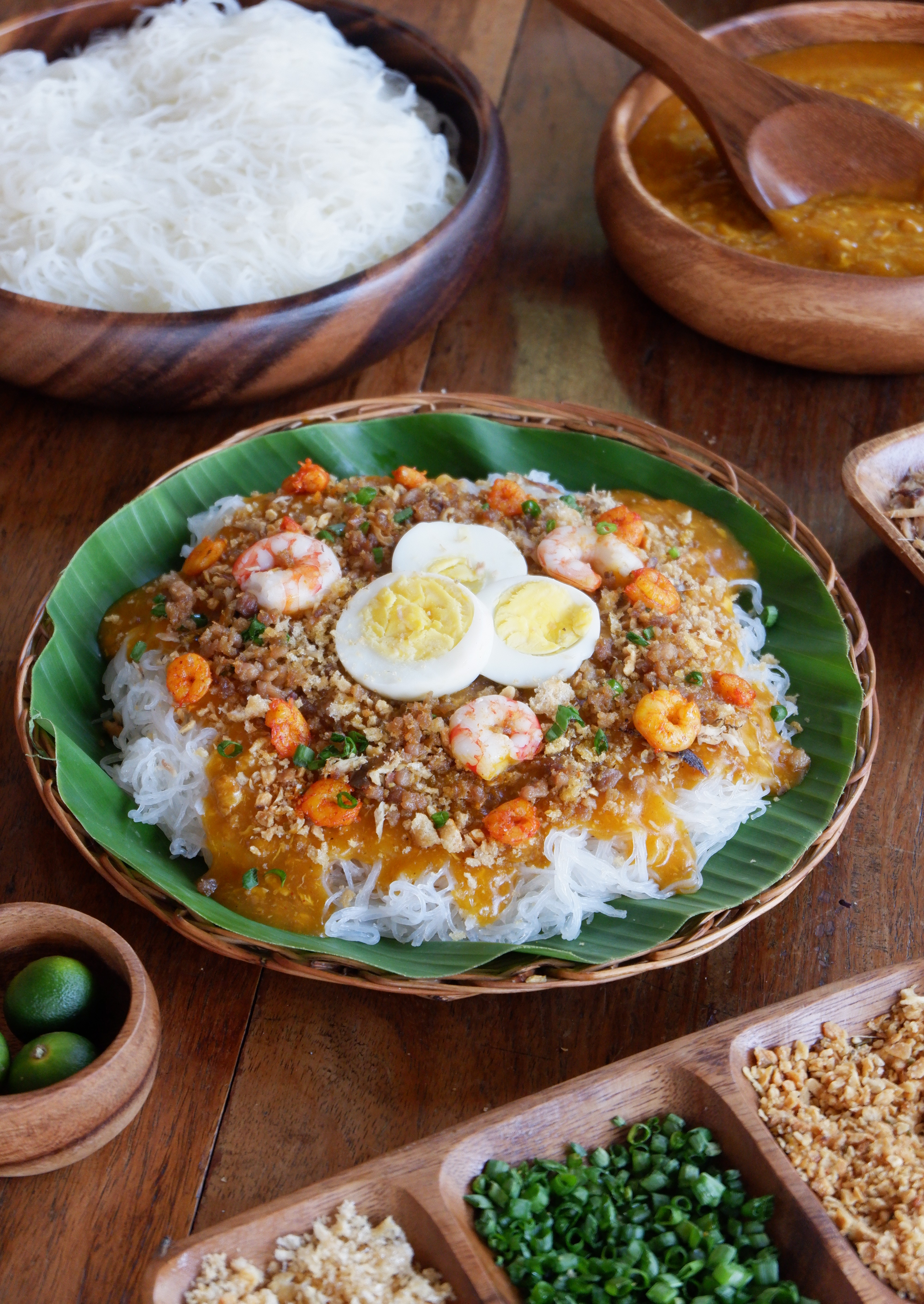
Palabok, a noodle dish topped with a savory shrimp sauce, hard-boiled eggs, chicharrón, and seafood.

Noodle dishes are generally called pancit. Pancit recipes primarily consist of noodles, vegetables, and slices of meat or shrimp with variations often distinguished by the type of noodles used. Some pancit, such as mami and La Paz-styled batchoy, are noodle soups while the "dry" varieties are comparable to chow mein in preparation.

Then there is spaghetti or ispageti in the local parlance that is a modified version of spaghetti bolognese. It is sometimes made with banana ketchup instead of tomato sauce, sweetened with sugar and topped with hot dog slices.

There are several rice porridges that are popular in the Philippines. One is arroz caldo, which is a rice porridge cooked with chicken, ginger and sometimes saffron, garnished with spring onions (chives), toasted garlic, and coconut milk to make a type of gruel.

Another variant is goto which is an arroz caldo made with ox tripe. There is also another much different rice porridge called champorado which is sweet and flavored with chocolate and often served at breakfast paired with tuyo or daing.

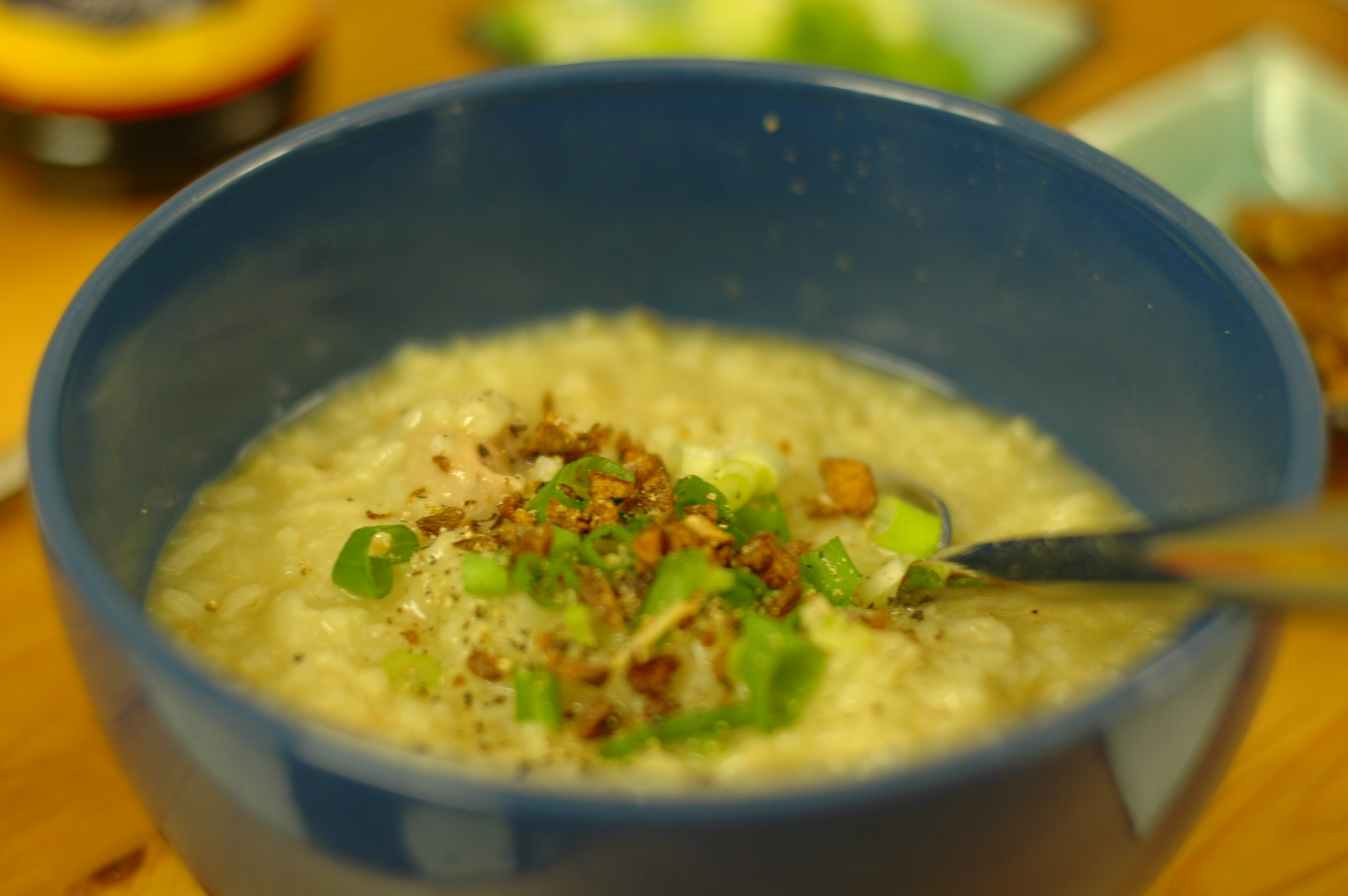
Arroz Caldo, a ginger-flavored chicken rice porridge.

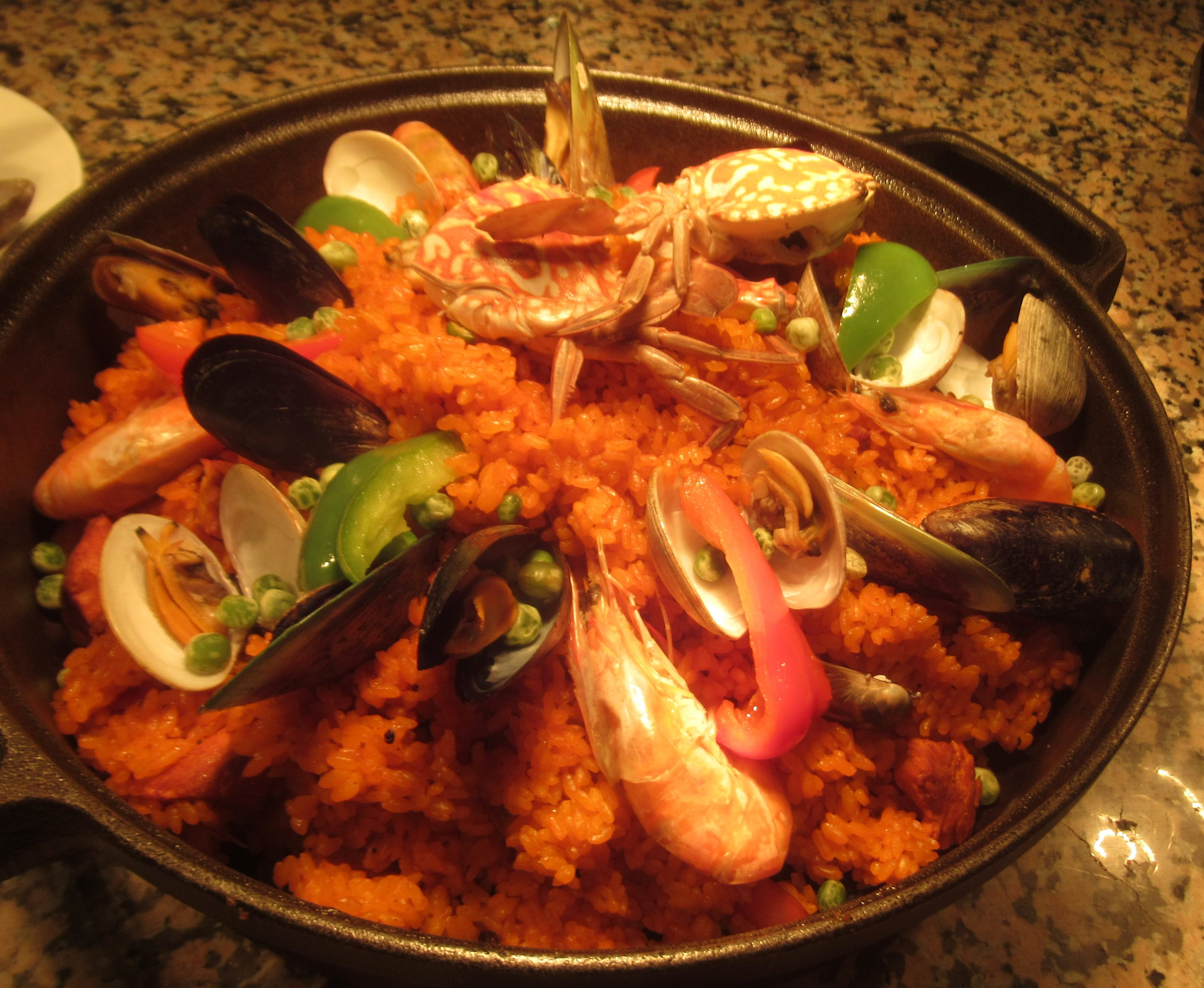
Paella, a rice dish with meat, seafood, and vegetables.

Another rice-based dish is arroz a la valenciana, a Spanish paella named after the Spanish region Valencia that has been incorporated into the local cuisine.

Bringhe is a local rice dish with some similarities to paella but using glutinous rice, coconut milk, and turmeric.

Kiampong a type of fried rice topped with pork pieces, chives and peanuts. It can be found in Chinese restaurants in Binondo and Manila. Camaron rebosado con jamon has been described as a classic dish in the Binondo district of Manila, the city's Chinatown.

For vegetarians, there is dinengdeng, a dish consisting of moringa leaves (malunggay) and slices of bittermelon. There is also pinakbet, stewed vegetables heavily flavored with bagoong. A type of seafood salad known as kinilaw is made up of raw seafood such as fish or shrimp cooked only by steeping in local vinegar, sometimes with coconut milk, onions, spices and other local ingredients. It is comparable to the Peruvian ceviche.

=== Side dishes ===
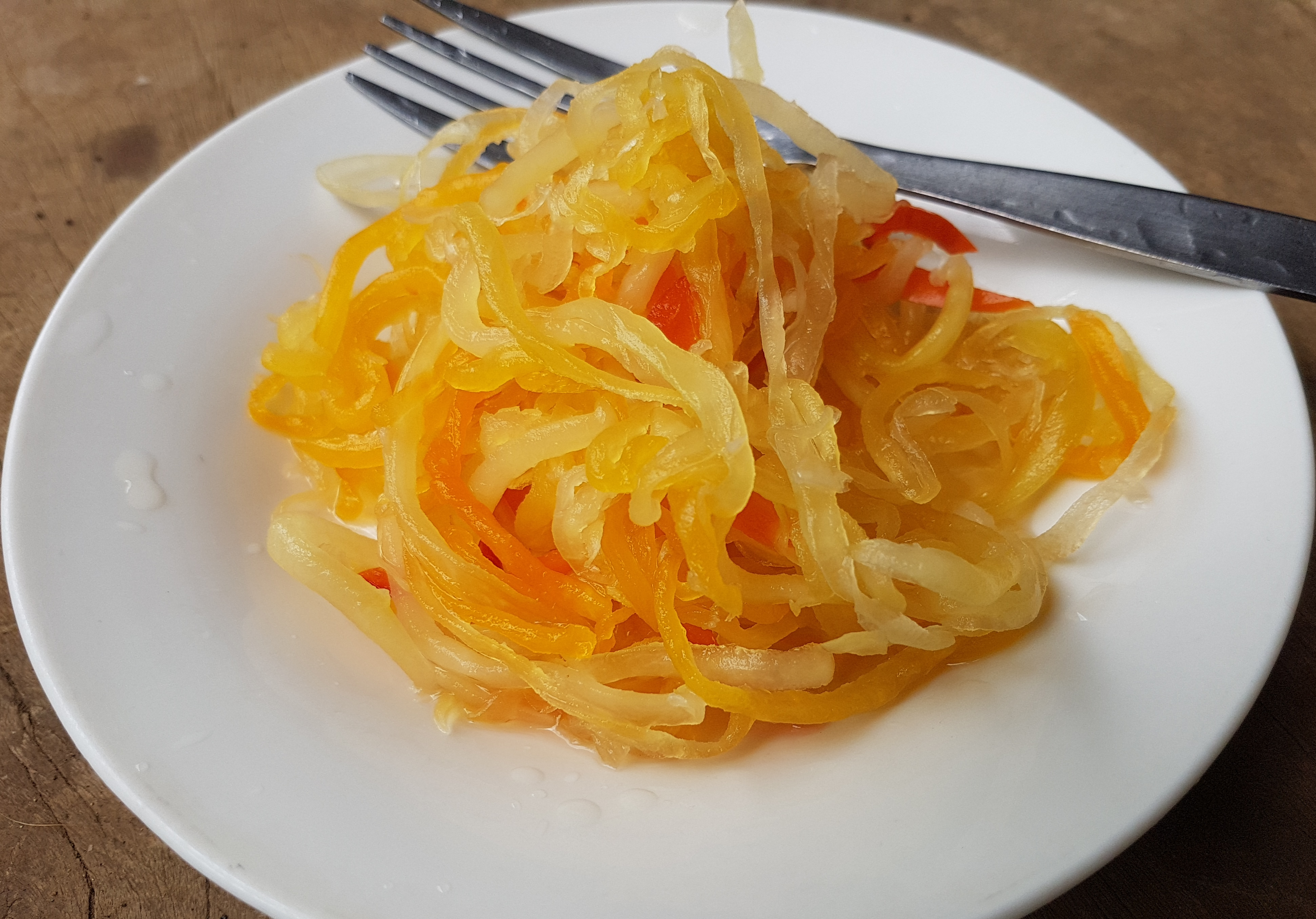
Atsara, a pickled green papaya.

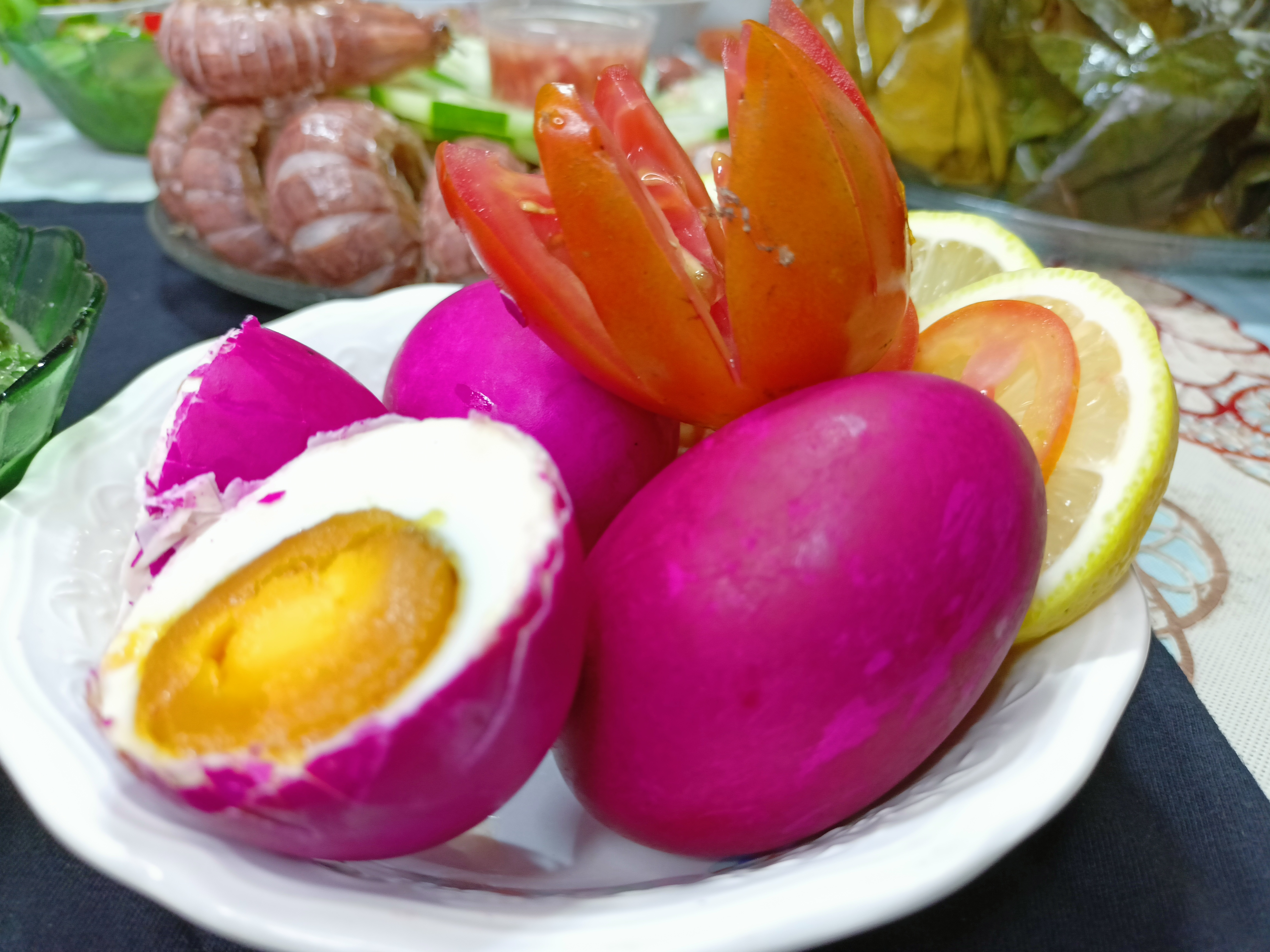
Itlog na maalat, salted eggs typically made from duck eggs.

Itlog na pula (red eggs) are duck eggs that have been cured in brine or a mixture of clay and salt for a few weeks, making them salty. They are later hard-boiled and dyed with red food coloring (hence the name) to distinguish them from chicken eggs before they are sold over the shelves. They are often served mixed in with diced tomatoes.

Atchara is a side dish of pickled papaya strips similar to sauerkraut. It is a frequent accompaniment to fried dishes like tapa or daing.

Nata de coco is a chewy, translucent, jelly-like food product produced by the fermentation of coconut water and can be served with pandesal. Kesong puti is a soft white cheese made from carabao milk (although cow milk is also used in most commercial variants). Grated mature coconut (niyog) is normally served with sweet rice-based desserts.

== Regional dishes ==
The Philippine islands are home to various ethnic groups resulting in varied regional cuisines.

=== Luzon ===
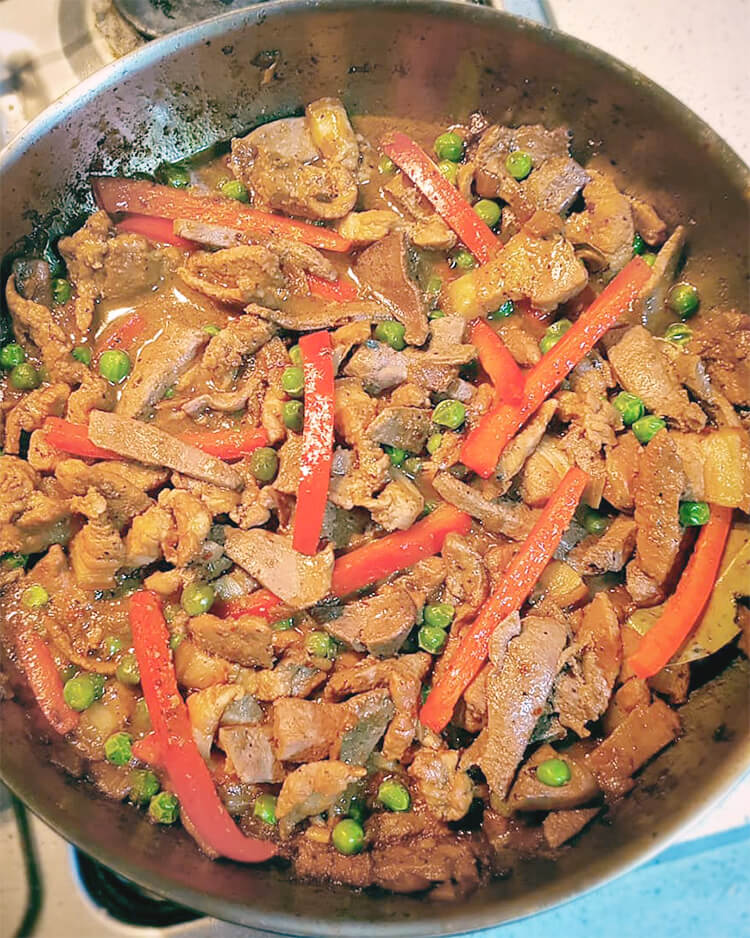
Igado, an Ilocano stew of pork and liver cooked in a vinegar and soy sauce-based sauce.

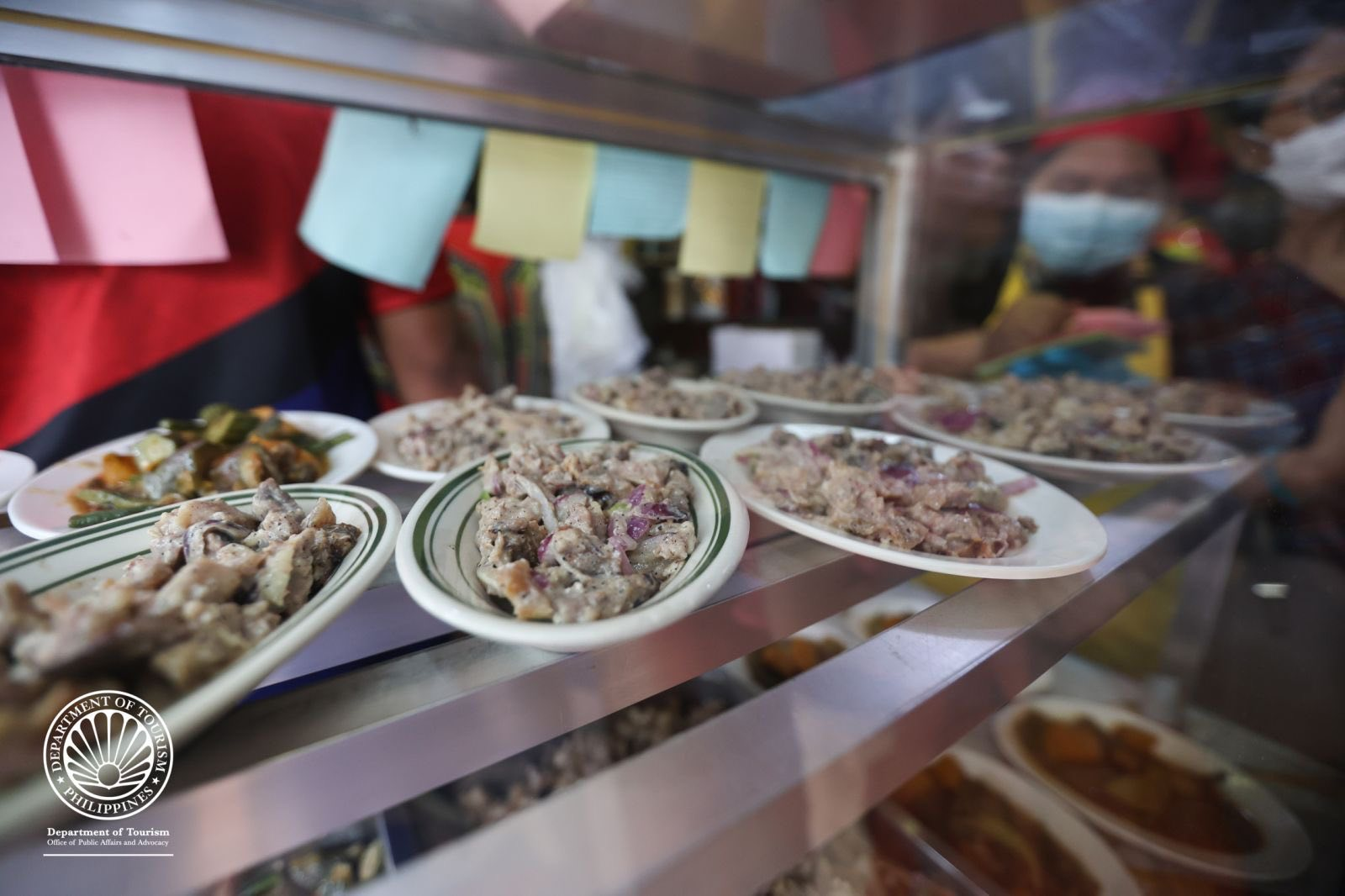
Dinakdakan, a creamy grilled pork dish from Ilocos, mixed with onions and spices.

Ilocano cuisine from the Ilocos Region characterized by a diet rich in boiled or steamed vegetables and freshwater fish, with a preference for salty, garlicky, bitter, and umami flavors. A defining ingredient is bugguóng monamón (fermented anchovies), which is widely used to season dishes such as KBL (kamatis, bugguóng, and lasona) a side dish or relish, pinakbet and dinengdeng, both of which have numerous variations depending on the vegetables used. The sukang Iloko (sugarcane vinegar) also known as suka basi is another essential ingredient, commonly used in dishes such as paksiw and kilawen. Meat dishes include bagnet and Vigan longganisa, and often incorporate offal from pig, goat, carabao, and cattle, as seen in specialties such as pinapaitan, sinanglao, lauya, igado, and dinakdakan.

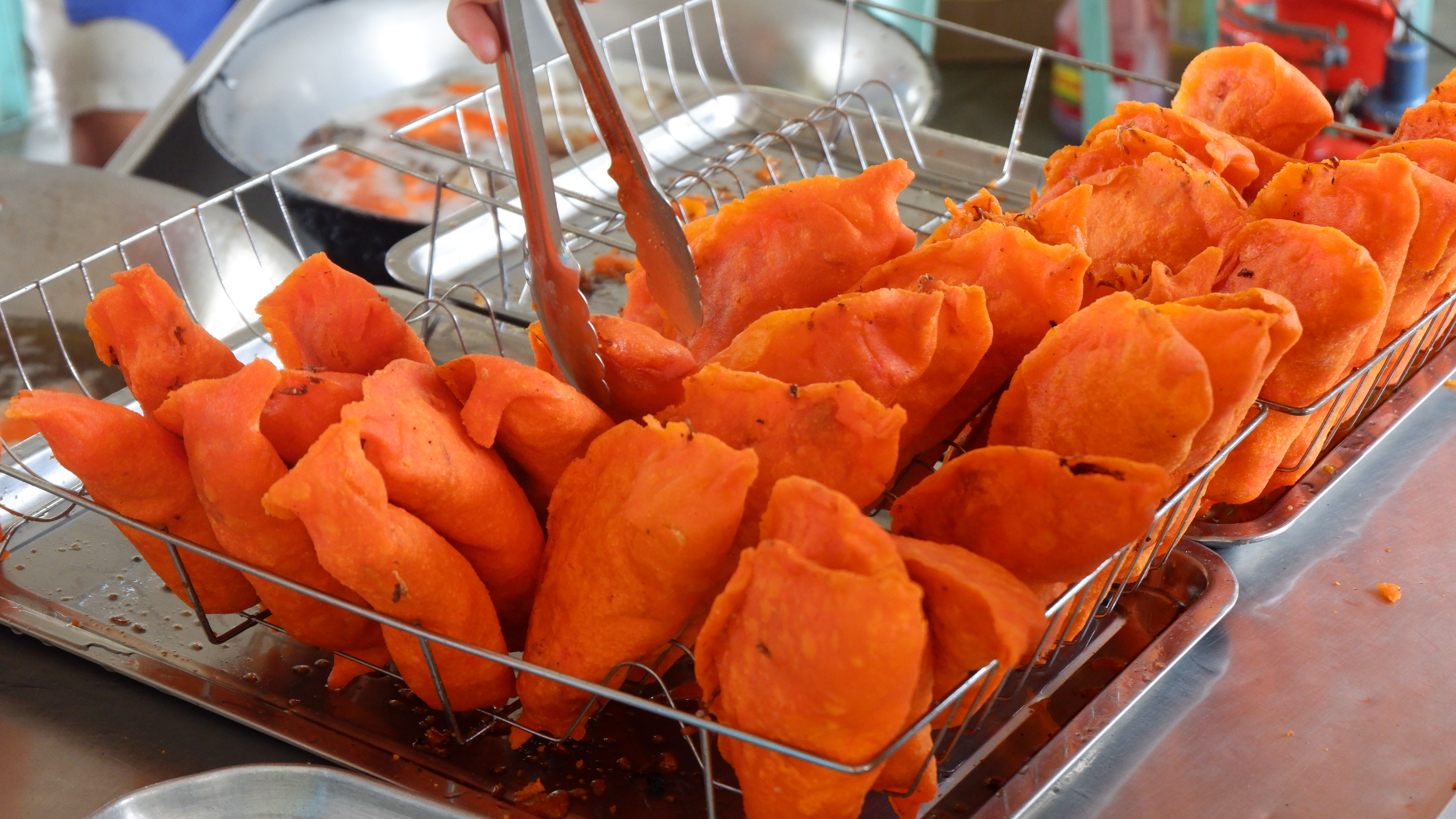
Ilocos Empanada, known for its orange, crispy dough and savory fillings, originates from Batac City.

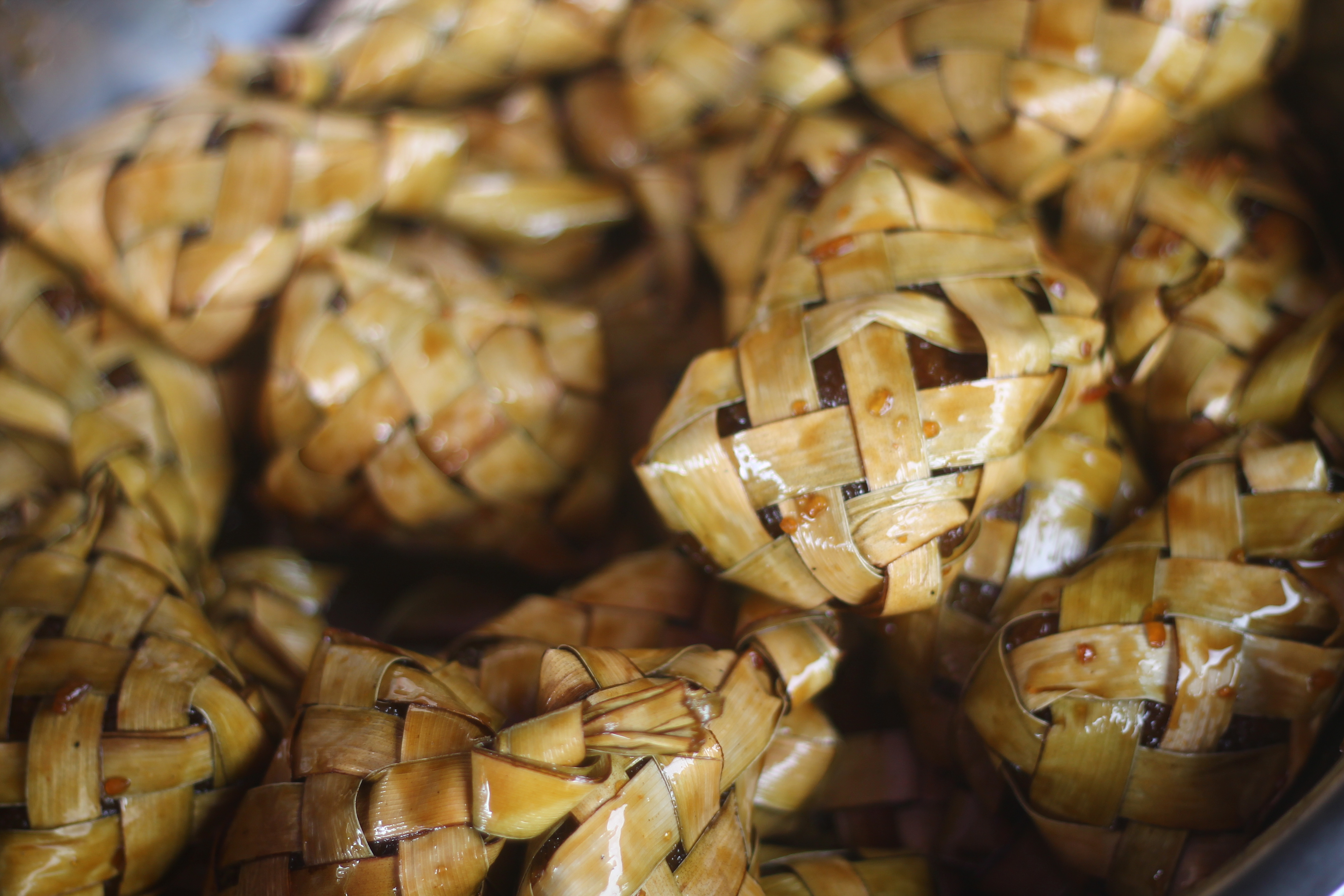
Patupat or Sinambong, a woven rice cake cooked in sugarcane juice.

Local delicacies also include Ilocos empanada, with regional varieties such as those from Batac, which feature a bright orange dough colored with atsuete, and those from Vigan, which have a paler dough.

Traditional rice cakes include tinubong, made with glutinous rice and coconut milk and cooked in bamboo tubes; dudol, made with rice flour, coconut milk, and sugarcane juice; patupat or sinambong, a woven pouch of glutinous rice cooked in coconut milk and sugarcane juice; royal bibingka, a dense sweet rice cake made with rice flour and sugar; and balikucha, a pulled sugar candy made from sugarcane juice.

In Pangasinan, local cuisine is known for dishes such as kaleskes, a savory soup made from beef or carabao innards; pigar-pigar, consisting of thinly sliced fried beef typically served with cabbage and onions; Alaminos longganisa, a garlicky native sausage from Alaminos; and boneless bangus, a deboned milkfish preparation that originated in Dagupan City, which is widely regarded as the “Bangus Capital of the Philippines.”

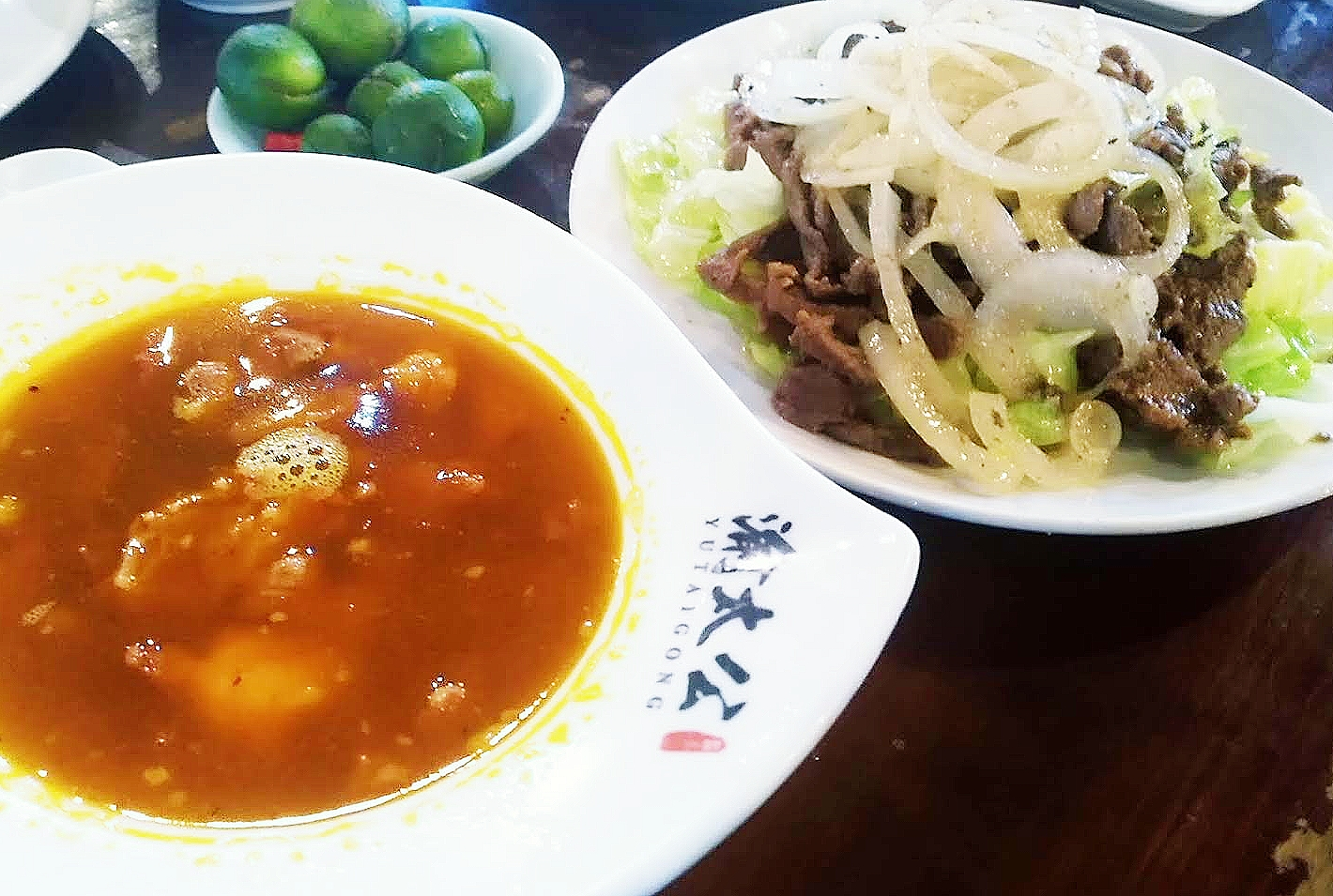
Pangasinan delicacies: pigar-pigar (right) and kaleskes (left).

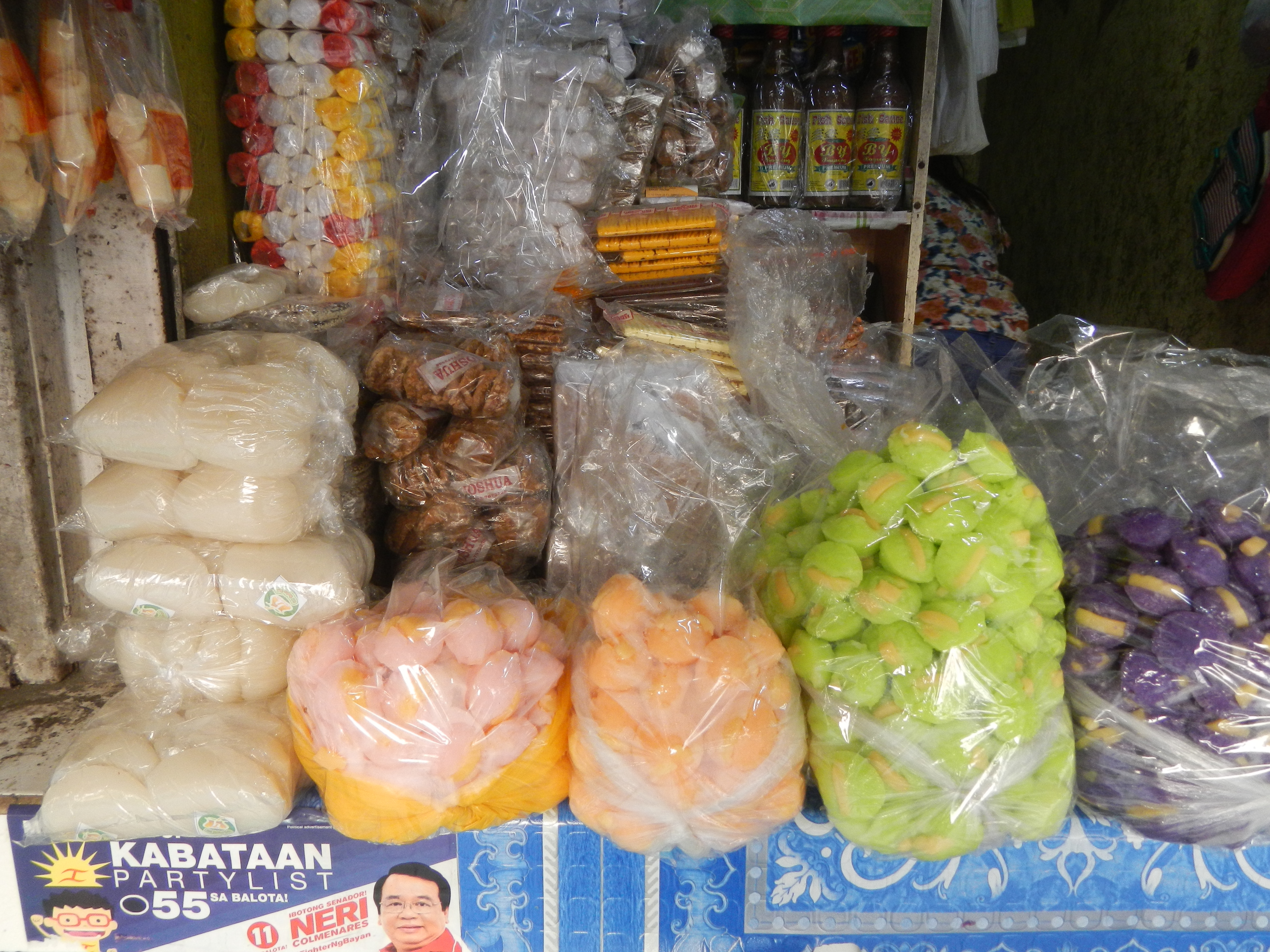
Puto Calasiao, a soft and chewy steamed rice cake from Calasiao.

Pangasinan desserts include binungey from Bolinao, a sticky rice cake cooked in bamboo with coconut milk and salt; Puto Calasiao, a soft and chewy steamed rice cake known for flavors such as ube and pandan; deremen, a black glutinous rice cake made from young, roasted, and pounded glutinous rice, cooked with coconut milk and sugar; and tupig, a roasted rice cake wrapped in banana leaves.

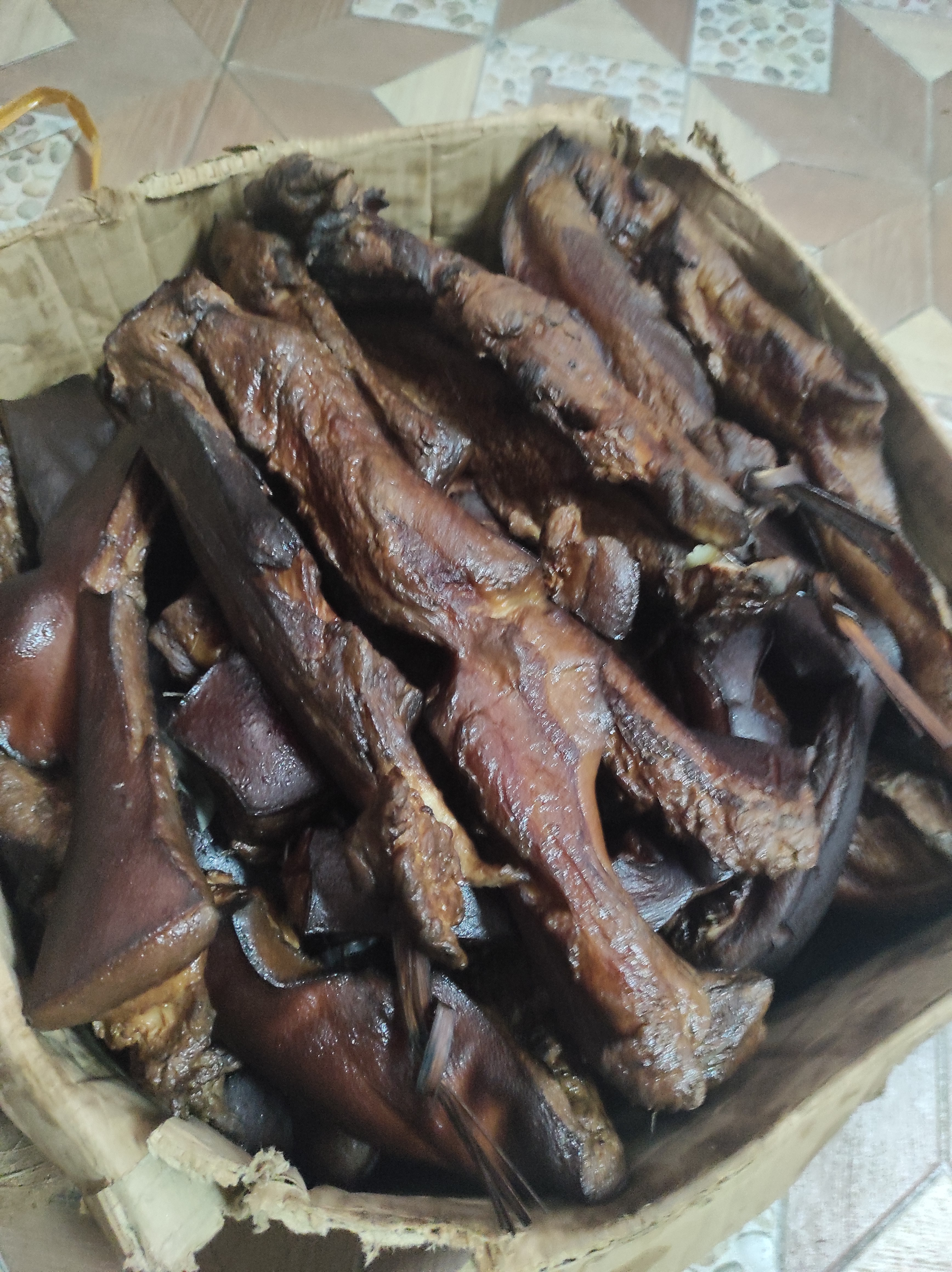
Etag, smoked and cured pork from Sagada.

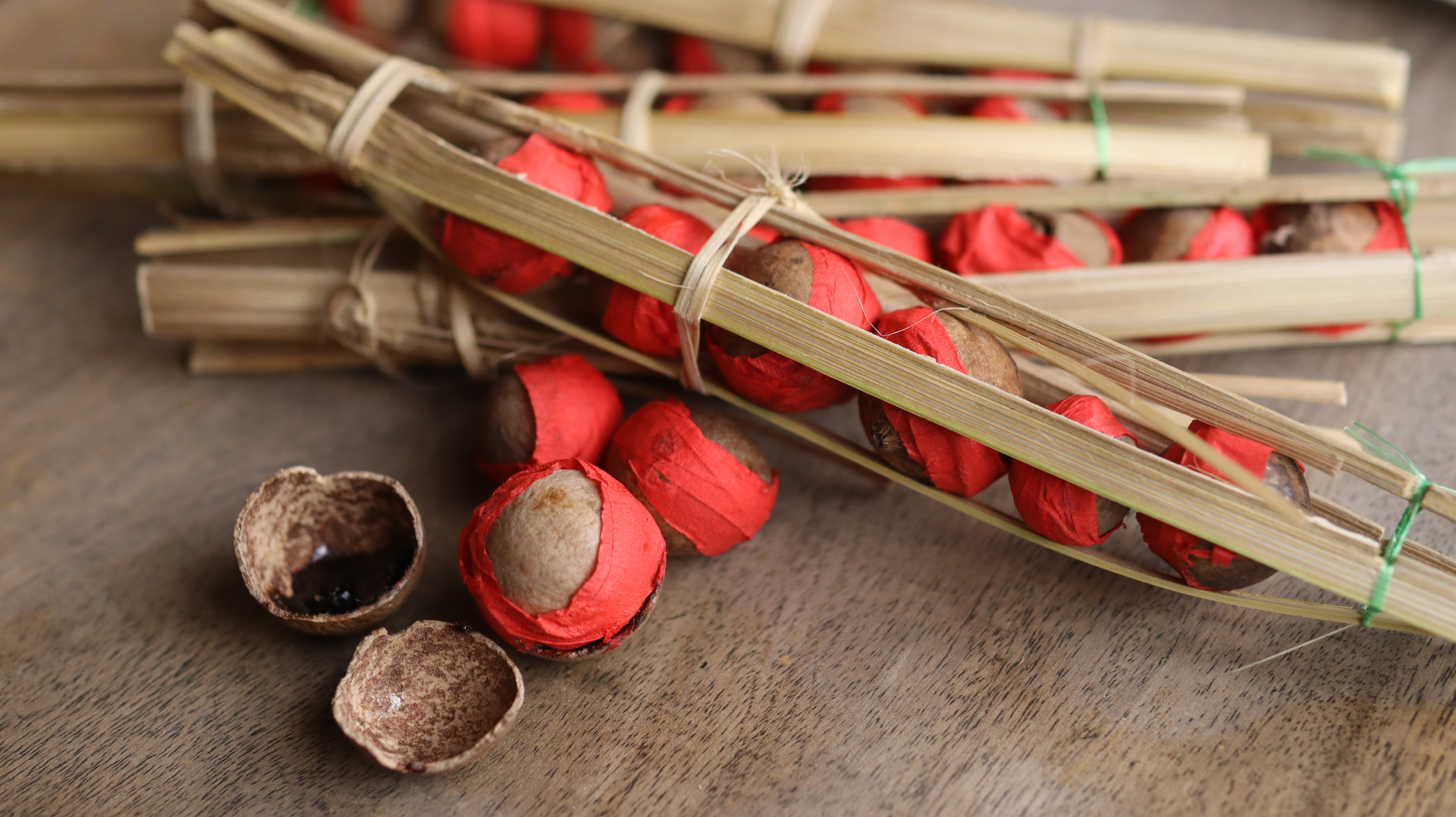
Sundot kulangot, a Baguio street snack made from sticky rice balls coated in sweetened peanut or sugar toppings.

In the Cordillera Region, particularly among Igorot ethnolinguistic group, cuisine is characterized by indigenous preservation methods such as smoking and sun-drying, which produce distinctly smoky, salty, and savory flavors. Common staples include etag or kiniing (smoked or cured pork preserved for extended periods), pinuneg (a sausage made from pork blood and meat stuffed into casings), pinikpikan (a traditional chicken stew prepared through a ritual process), and watwat (boiled meat cut into portions and shared communally), which are commonly prepared and served during community gatherings and traditional feasts.

Due to its mild, sub-tropical climate, Baguio, along with the outlying mountainous regions, is renowned for its produce. Temperate-zone fruits and vegetables (strawberries being a notable example) which would otherwise wilt in lower regions are grown there. It is also known for a snack called sundot-kulangot which literally means "poke the booger." It is a sticky kind of sweet made from milled glutinous rice flour mixed with molasses, and served inside pitogo shells, and with a stick to "poke" its sticky substance with.

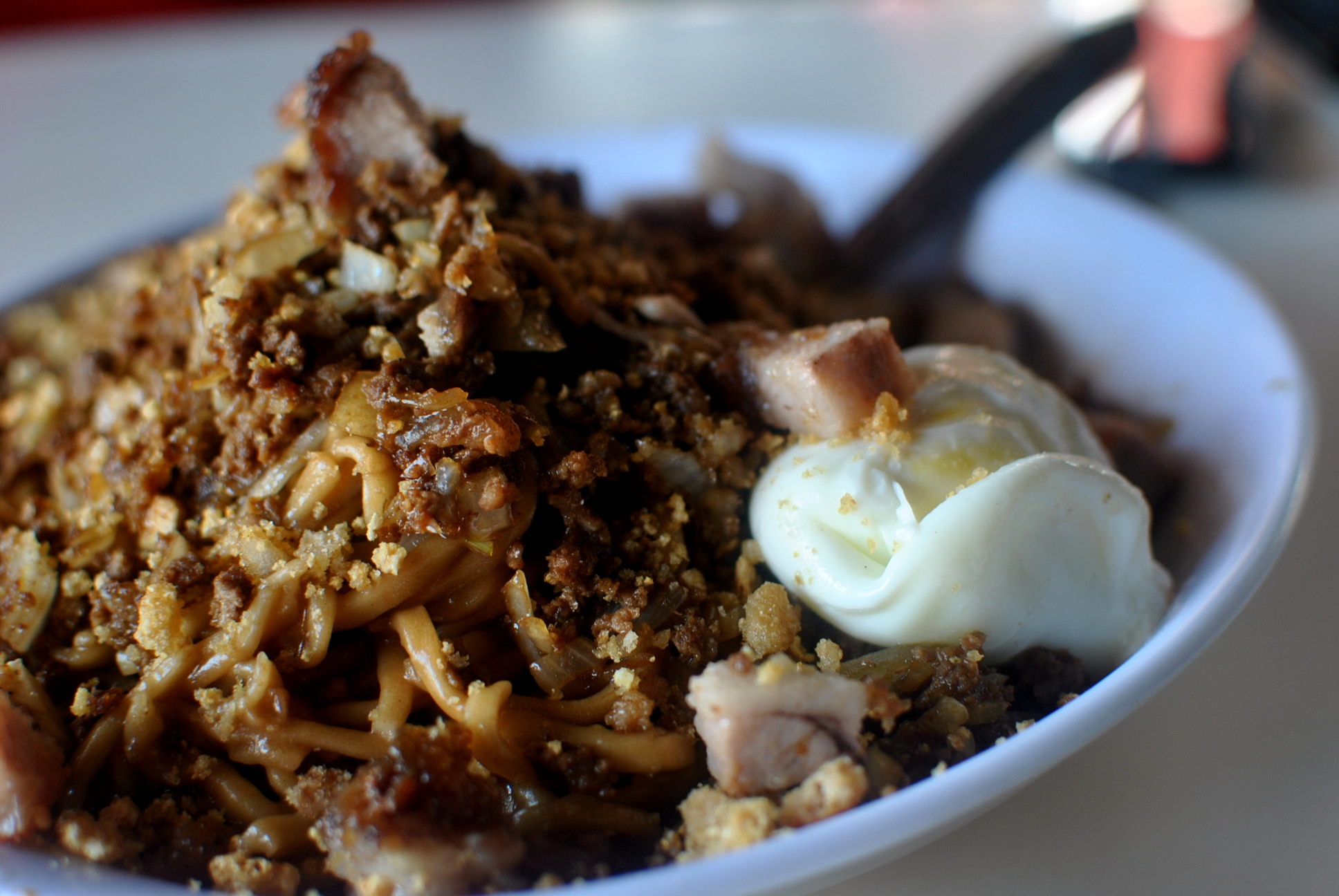
Pancit Batil Patong, a noodle dish from Tuguegarao topped with sautéed ground meat and egg.

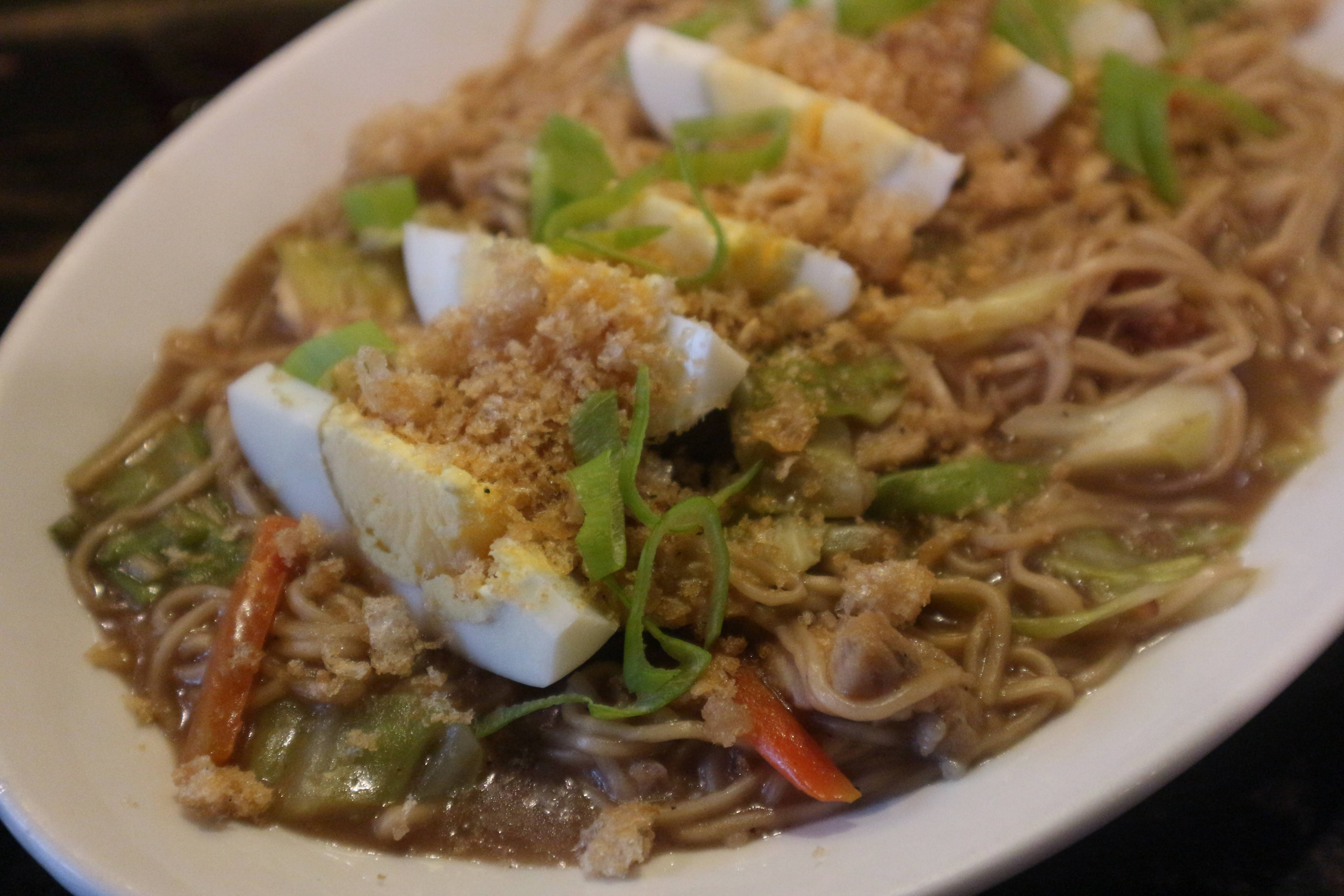
Pancit Cabagan, a stir-fried noodle dish from Cabagan, made with egg noodles, vegetables, and meat.

In the Cagayan Valley, noodle dishes are a prominent part of the regional cuisine. The Pancit batil patong from Tuguegarao City features stir-fried miki noodles with ground carabeef, pork liver, onions, carrots, cabbage, and bean sprouts, topped (patong) with a beaten egg (batil) and poached or fried egg with chicharon. Pancit Cabagan from Cabagan, Isabela, uses fresh miki noodles stir-fried in a soy-based sauce with lechon carajay, quail eggs, igado, and vegetables. Sinanta, an Ibanag dish, consists of vermicelli or flat noodles in a rich, annatto-colored pork and chicken broth.

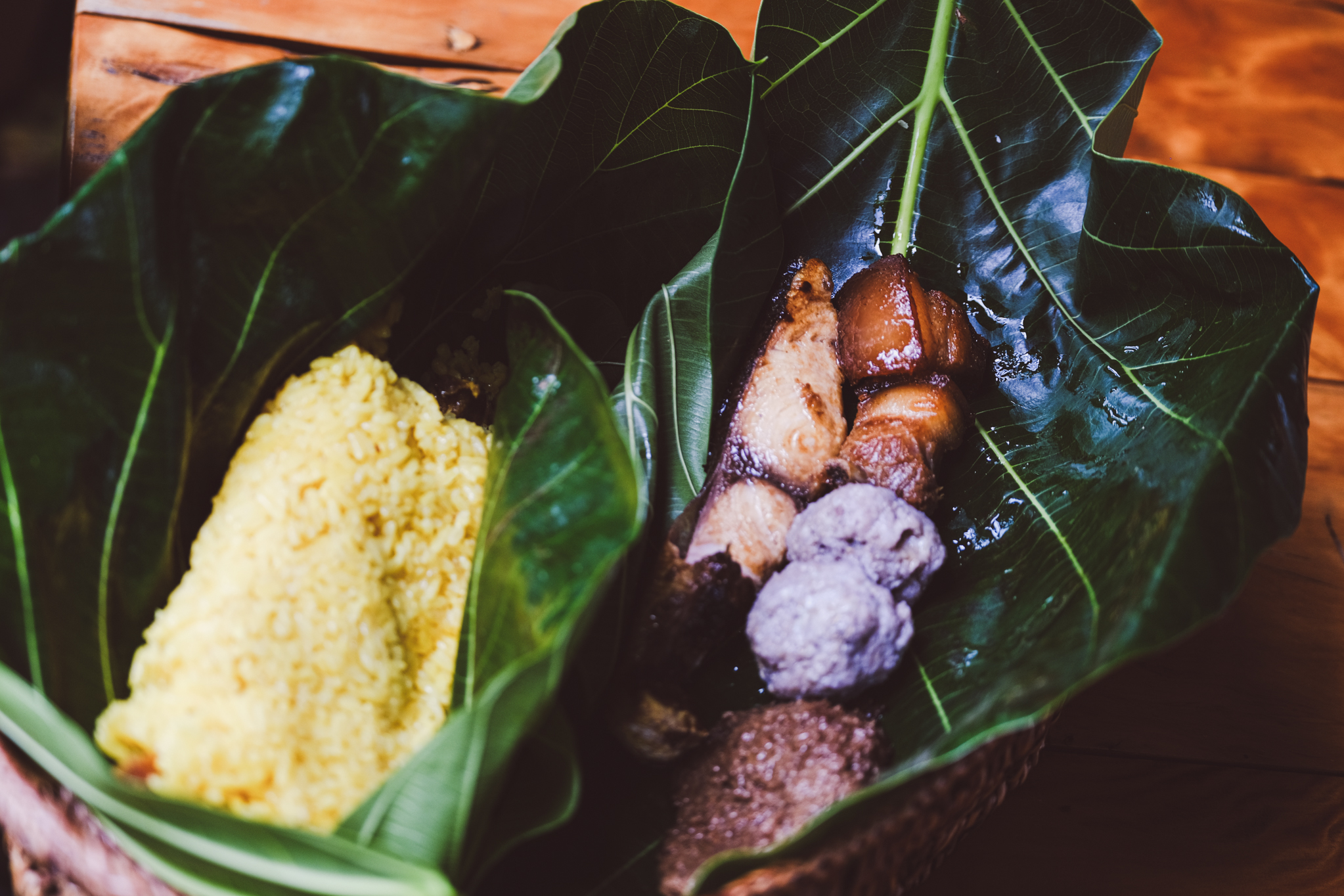
Ivatan cuisine, featuring dishes such as luñis, uved, supas or turmeric rice, and fish.

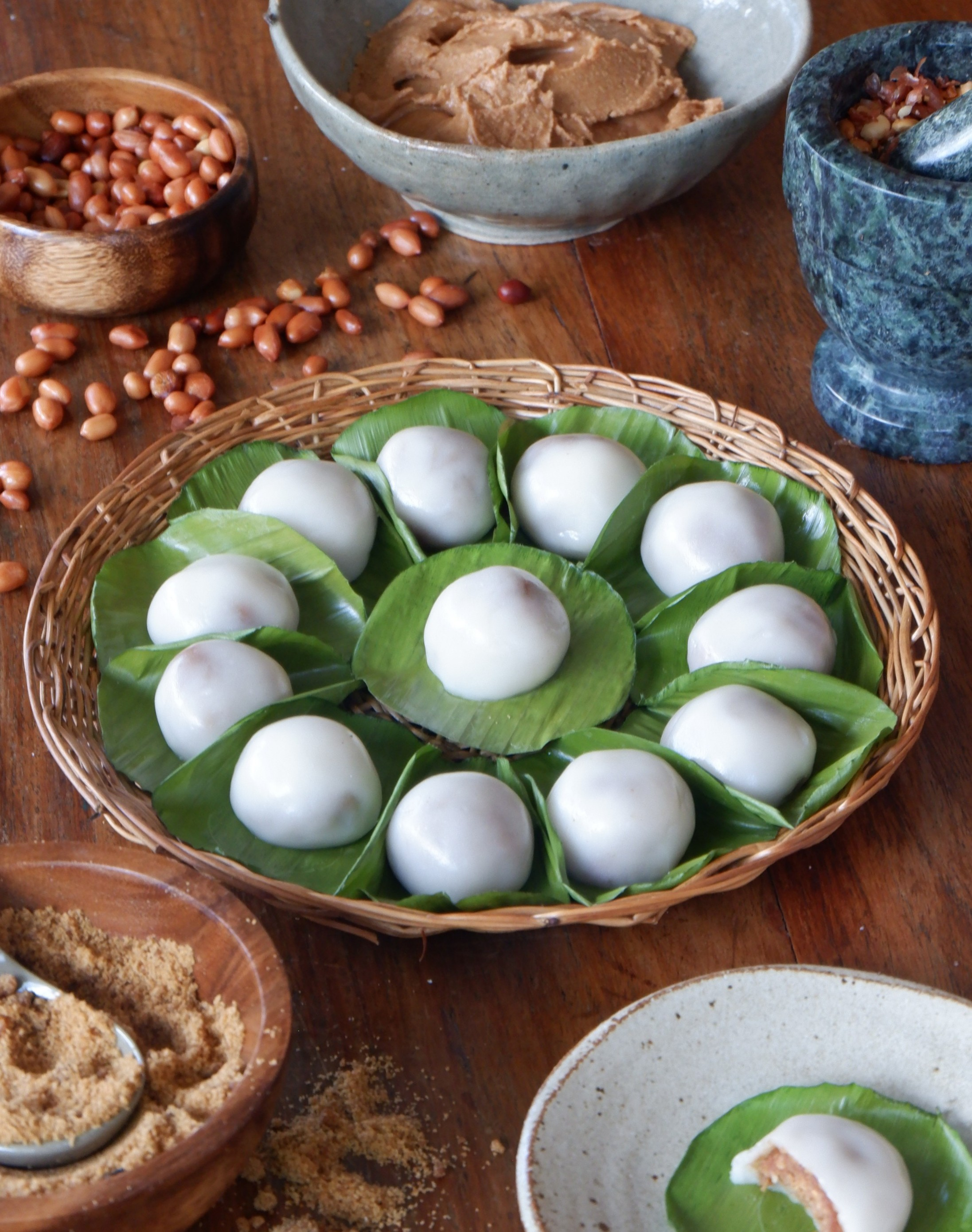
Pawa, a sweet delicacy from Piat, Cagayan made of glutinous rice, ground peanuts, and muscovado.

In Batanes, traditional Ivatan dishes often highlight preserved ingredients such as luñis (or luniz) is slow-cooked pork belly prepared in its own fat with rock salt, served crispy with turmeric rice. Vunes are preserved taro cooked with pork, coconut milk, and ginger, while uved or tabtab in Sabtang, is minced banana corm mixed with meat or fish, shaped into balls, and either fried or served in broth. Supas (or balencyana in Itbayat) is rice cooked with turmeric and garlic.

Desserts include binallay, steamed rice flour wrapped in banana leaves and often topped with caramelized molasses and latik; sinabalu, an Itawes rice cake made from glutinous rice and coconut milk cooked in bamboo tubes; and pawa, chewy rice cakes filled with sweetened peanuts originally from Piat, Cagayan.

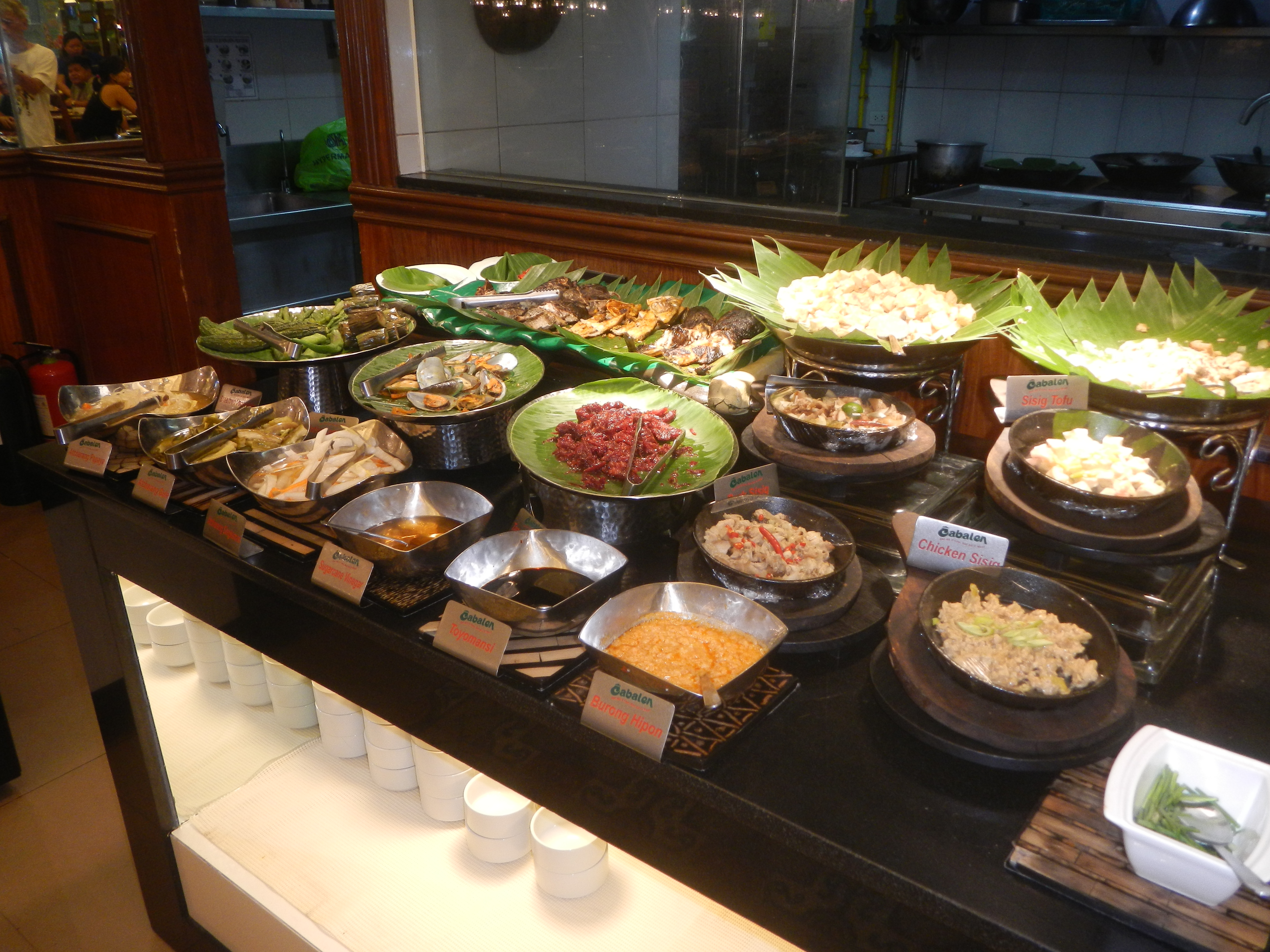
Kapampangan dishes featuring a variety of sisig and buro, served at Cabalen.

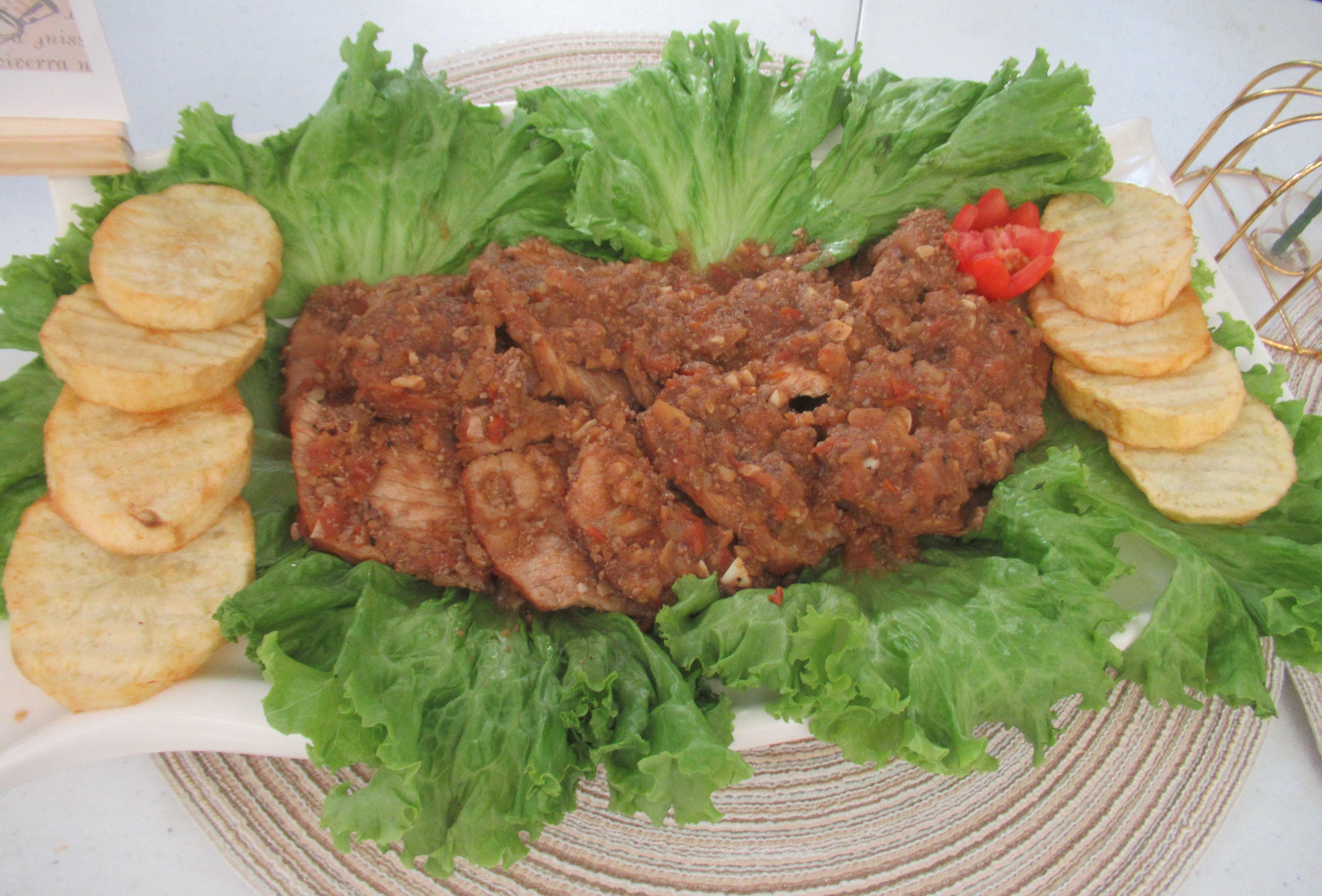
Asadung matua, a pork stew with a savory, tangy, and tender profile.

Kapampangan cuisine originates from the provinces of Pampanga and parts of Tarlac in Central Luzon. It is characterized by its bold and rich flavors and its use of locally available ingredients, including a wide range of meat cuts and offal. Among its most well-known dishes are sisig, made from chopped pork parts with calamansi, onions, and chili; kare-kare, a peanut-based stew with oxtail and vegetables; and tocino, locally known as pindang, a sweet-cured pork dish.

Other Kapampangan traditional dishes include buro, a fermented rice dish with shrimp or fish often paired with blanched vegetables; asadung matua, a marinated stewed pork with sweet and savory flavors; and bringhe, a Kapampangan version of paella made with glutinous rice and coconut milk. Additional dishes such as tid-tad a pork with curdled blood and innards; sipo egg, a creamy dish with quail eggs, ham, and vegetables; kilayin a pork and organ meats cooked in vinegar, and pulutok a minced pork lungs and heart.

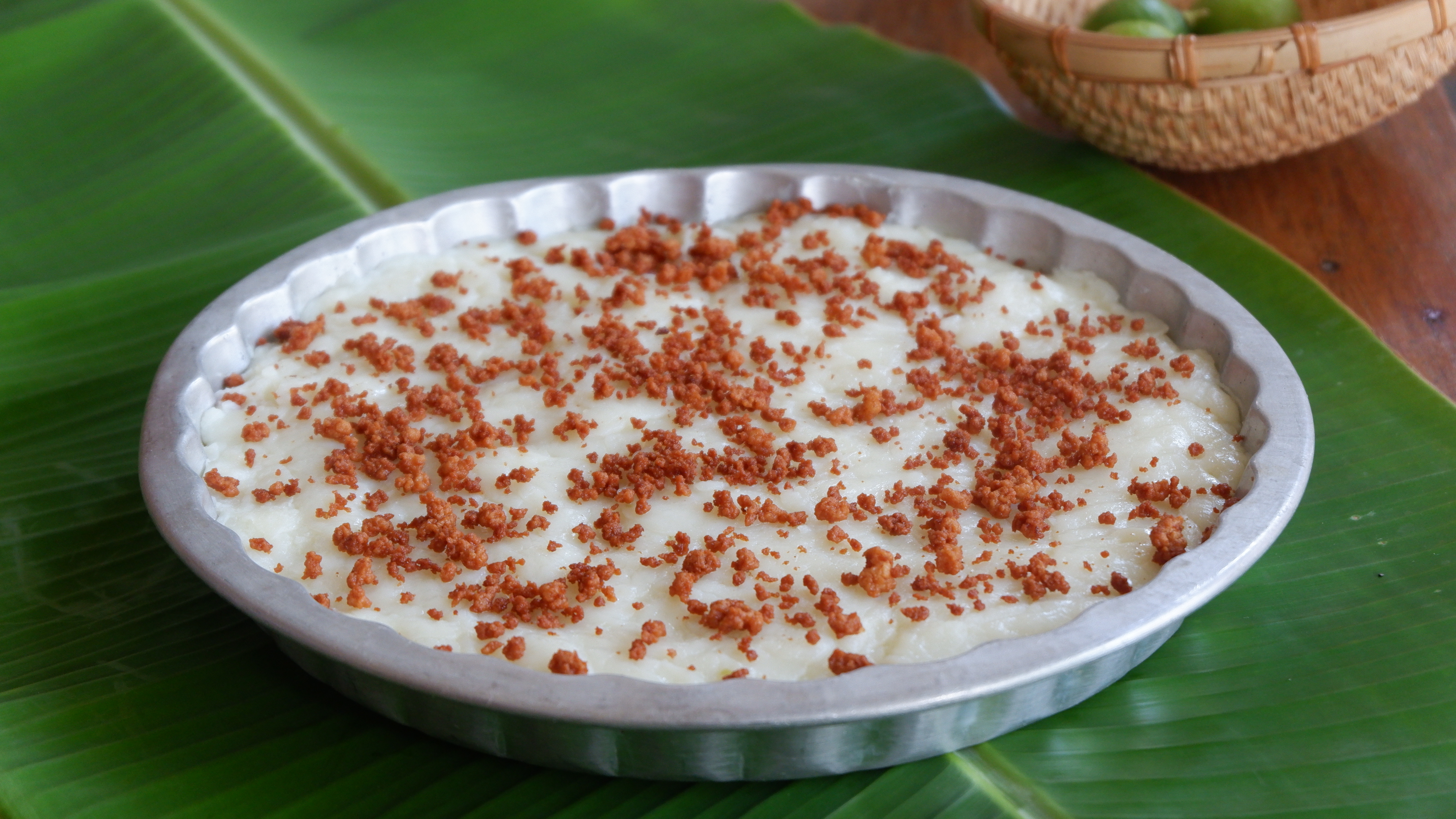
Tibok-tibok, a pudding made with carabao and coconut milk, topped with caramel or latik.

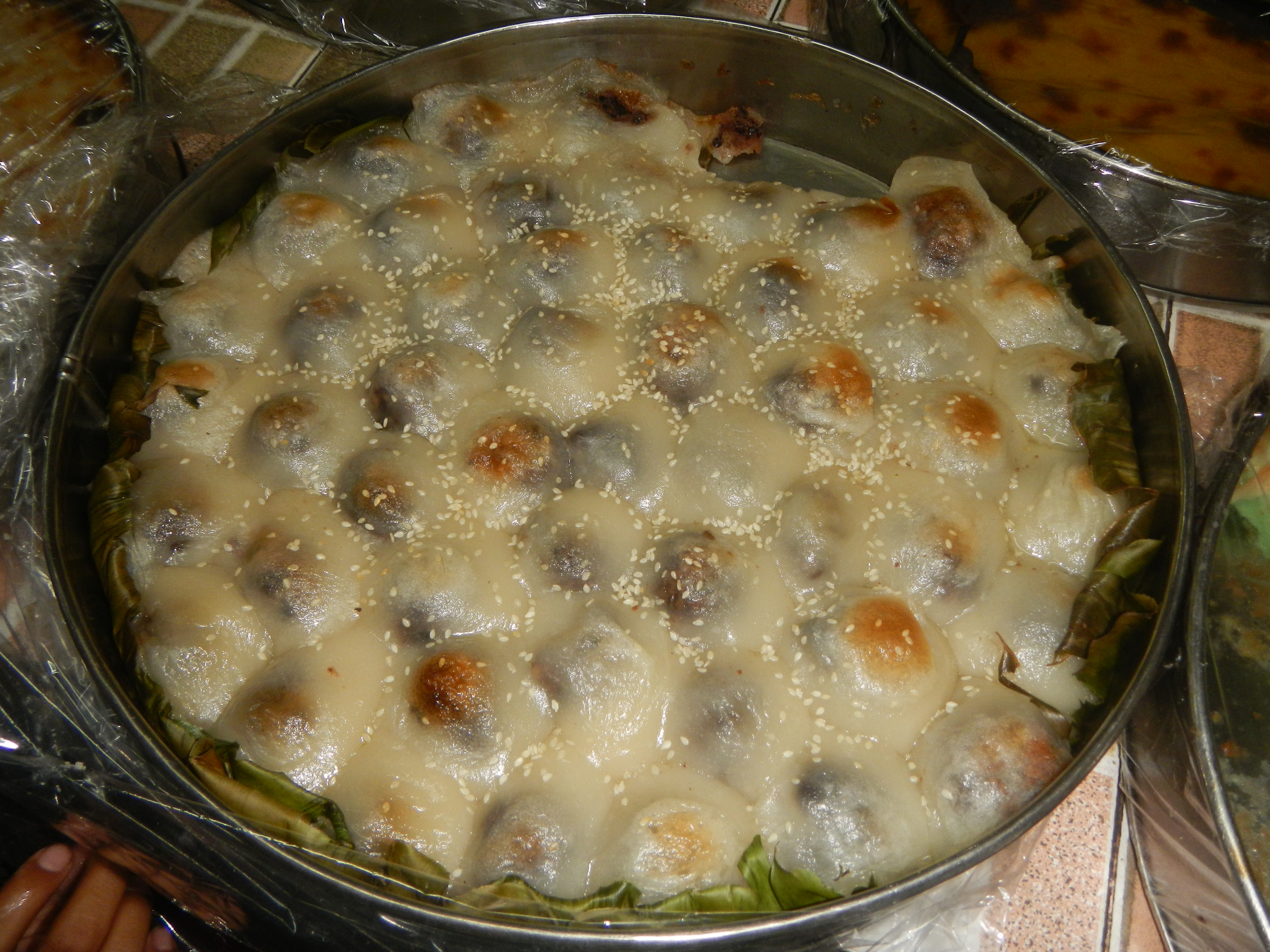
Moche, a glutinous rice balls filled with sweet bean paste.

Traditional desserts include tibok-tibok, a carabao milk pudding; plantanillas, carabao milk pastillas wrapped in soft egg-yolk crepes; moche, glutinous rice balls with bean paste filling; lelut balatong, toasted mung beans with glutinous rice cooked in coconut milk; kalame ube, a rice cake made with ube; and saniculas, crumbly arrowroot-based cookies traditionally stamped with the image of San Nicolas de Tolentino.

The cuisine of the Tagalog people varies by province. Bulacan is popular for Chicharrón (pork rinds) and steamed rice and tuber cakes like puto. It is a center for panghimagas or desserts, like brown rice cake or kutsinta, sapin-sapin, suman, cassava cake, ube halaya and the king of sweets, in San Miguel, Bulacan, the famous carabao milk candy pastillas de leche, with its pabalat wrapper. Cainta, in Rizal province east of Manila, is known for its Filipino rice cakes and puddings.

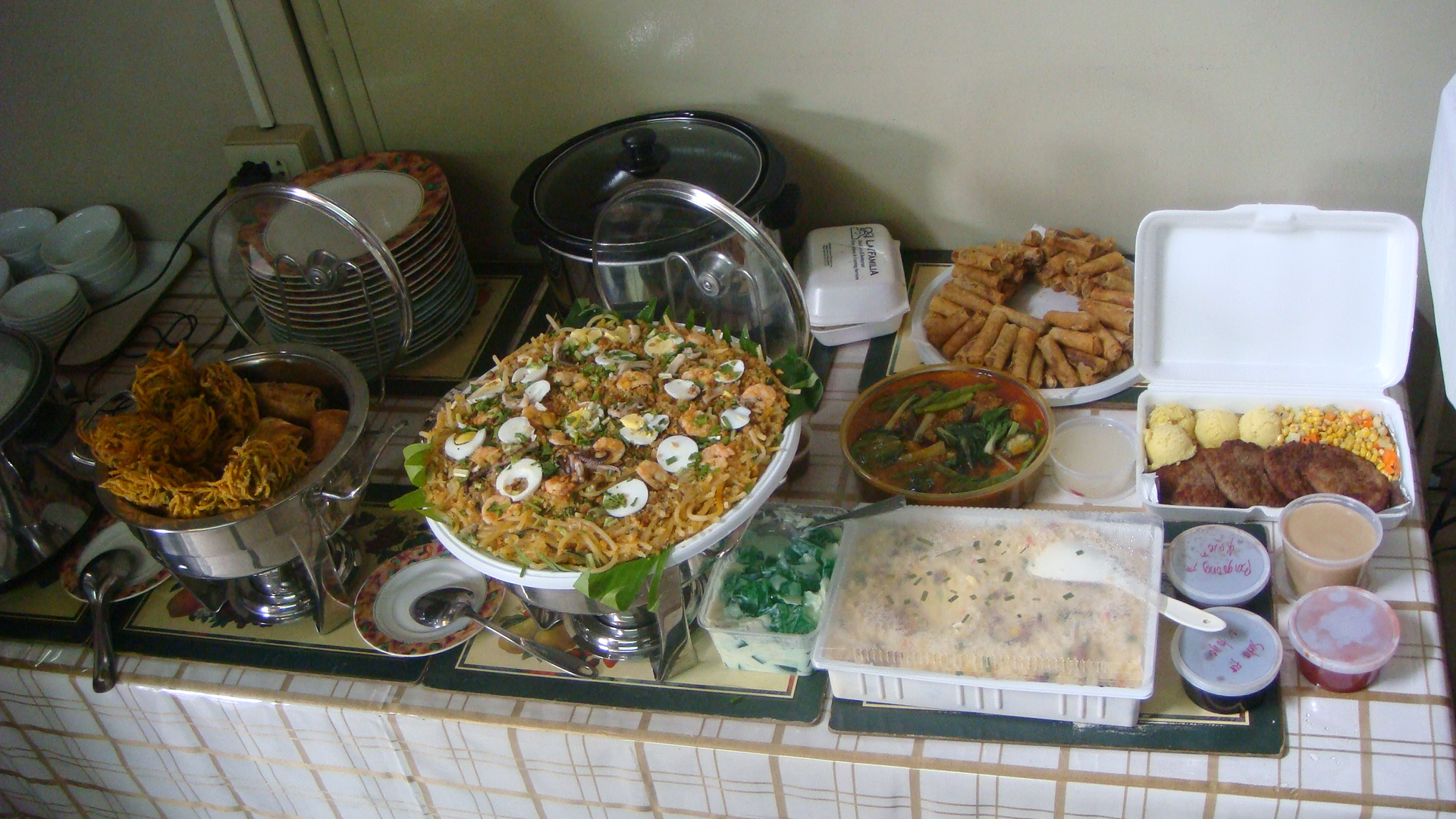
Filipino cuisine prepared in Baliuag, Bulacan.

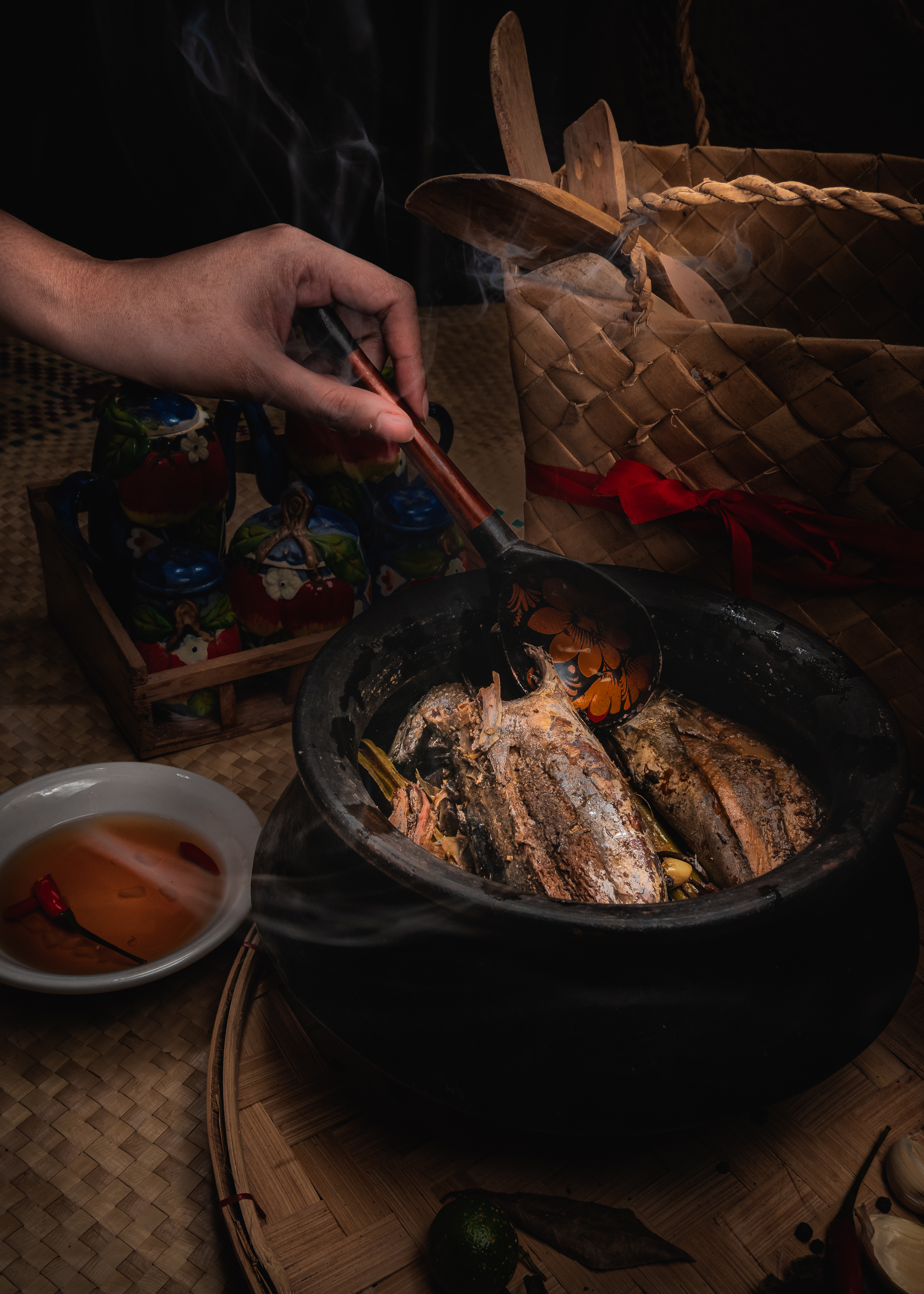
Sinaing na tulingan, a Tagalog people dish of mackerel tuna slowly cooked with salt and sometimes wrapped in banana leaves.

These are usually topped with latik, a mixture of coconut milk and brown sugar, reduced to a dry crumbly texture. A more modern, and time saving alternative to latik are coconut flakes toasted in a frying pan. Antipolo, straddled mid-level in the mountainous regions of the Philippine Sierra Madre, is a town known for its suman and cashew products.

Laguna is known for buko pie (coconut pie) and panutsa (peanut brittle). Batangas is home to Taal Lake, a body of water that surrounds Taal Volcano. The lake is home to 75 species of freshwater fish, including landlocked marine species that have since adapted to the Taal lake environment. Eight of these species are of high commercial value. These include a population of giant trevally locally known as maliputo which is distinguished from their marine counterparts which are known as talakitok.

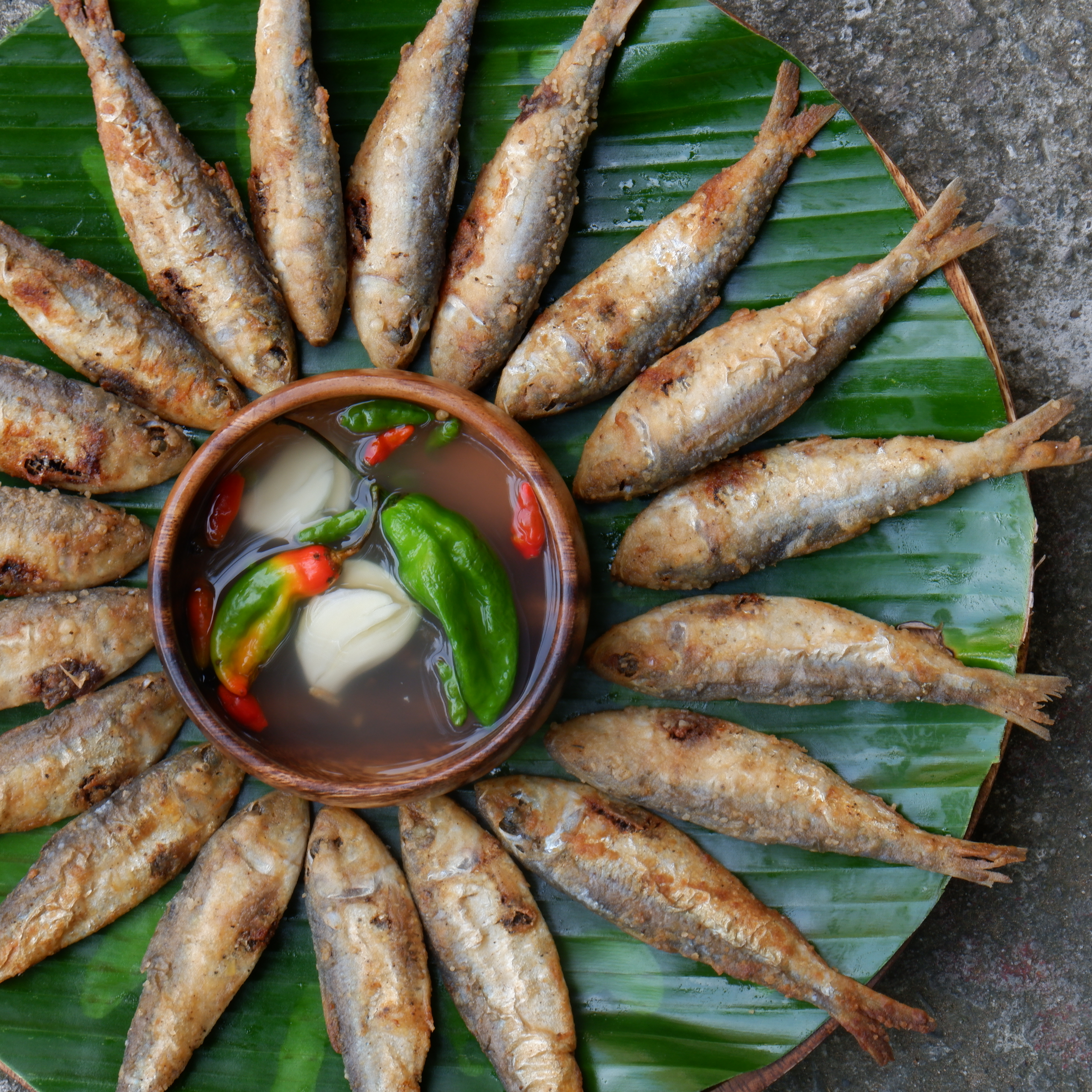
Fried tawilis, a popular dish in Batangas and Tagaytay.

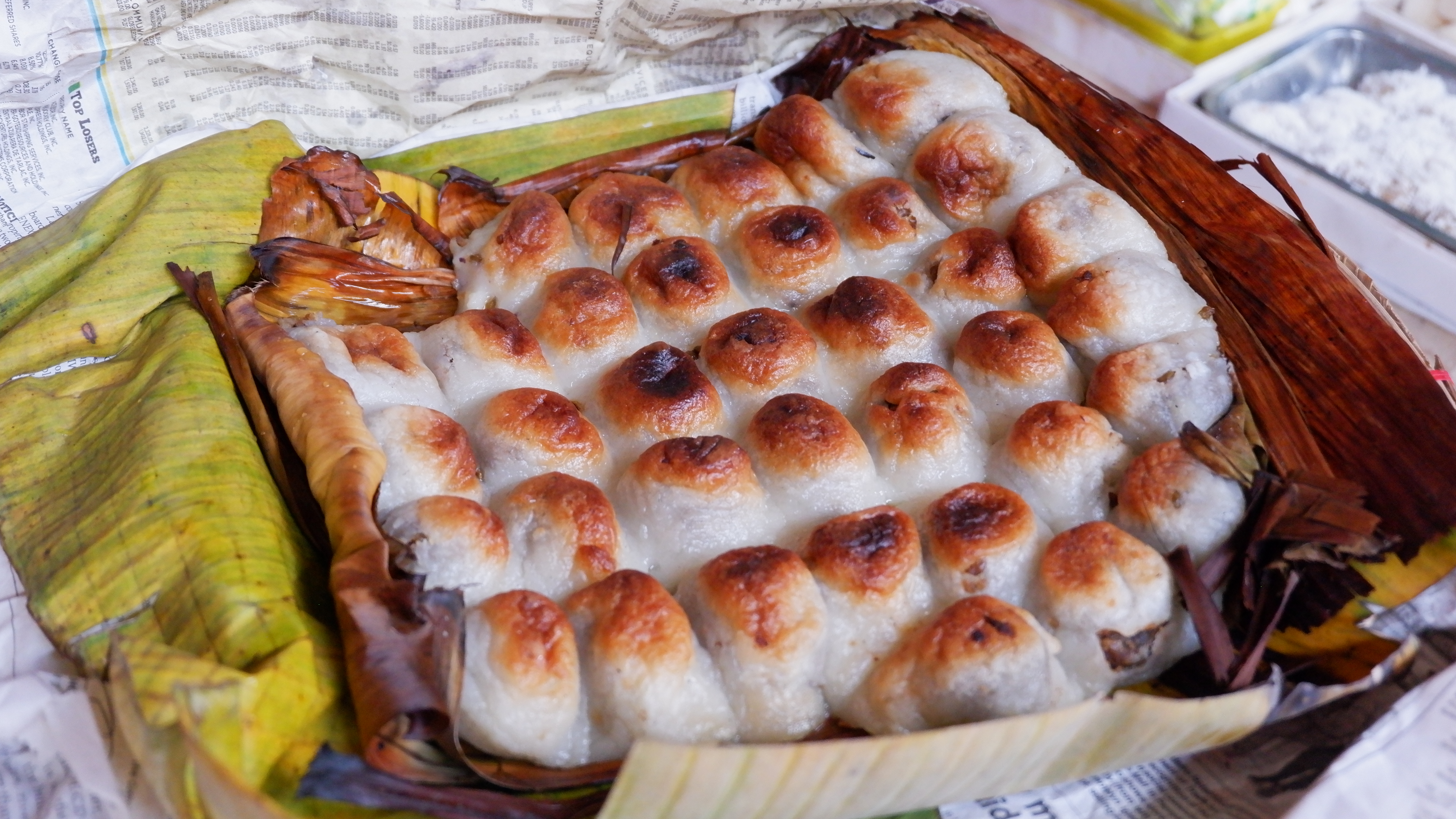
Bibingkoy, a glutinous rice dumpling delicacy originating from Cavite City.

Another commercially important species is the tawilis, the only known freshwater sardine and endemic to the lake. Batangas is also known for its special coffee, kapeng barako. Quezon, especially the town of Lucban, is also known for its culinary dishes, with Lucban longganisa, pancit habhab, and hardinera being the most notable. The influence of coconut milk dishes, such as laing (called tinuto in some places in Quezon) and sinantol, is also felt in the province because of its proximity to Bicol.

Suman is also a notable food in the province, especially in the town of Infanta and the city of Tayabas, though having the same ingredients as the one in Antipolo, the things that makes Infanta and Tayabas suman unique is its packaging and size; Infanta's suman is smaller in size and is usually grouped into 20 per pack, while Tayabas' suman is also unique in packaging, with a long tail that makes it look like a lit candle, in connection to its tradition of throwing suman during the feast of the city's patron, Isidore the Laborer.

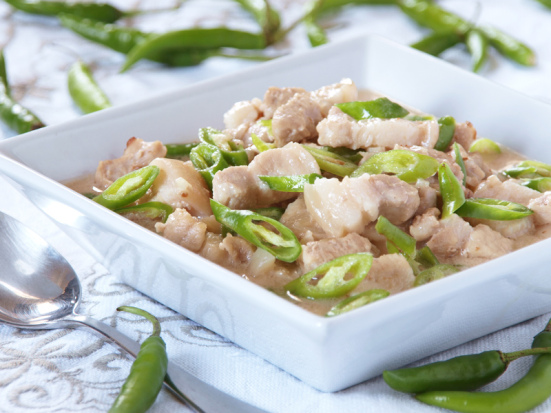
Sinilihan, popularly known as Bicol express, is a popular dish from Bicol.

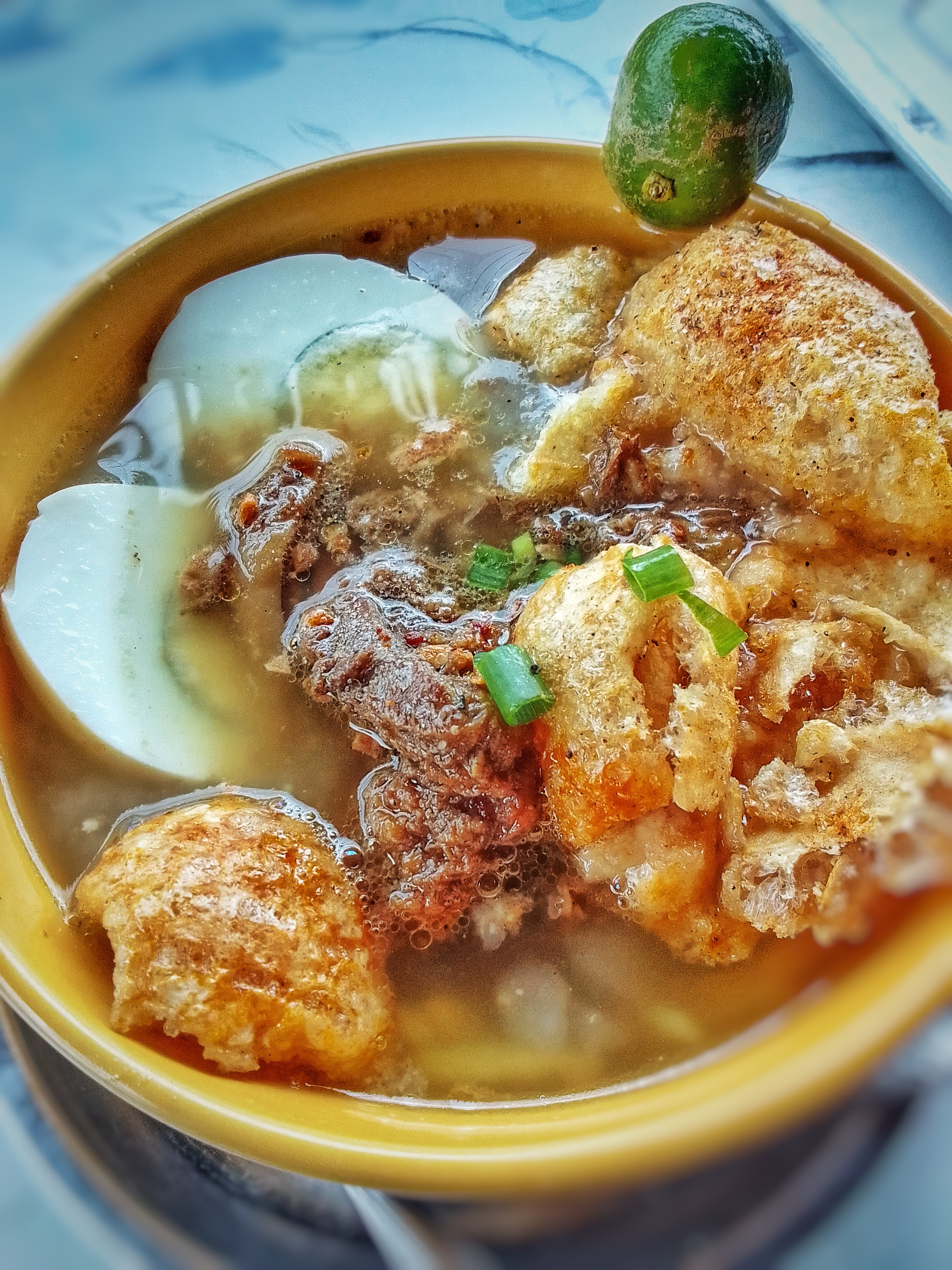
Kinalas, a noodle soup topped with shredded beef and a rich, flavorful broth.

Bicol Region is noted for its gastronomic appetite for fiery or chili-hot dishes, often combined with coconut milk, with natong (taro leaves) as a common ingredient in dishes such as laing and pinangat. One of the most well-known dishes is Bicol express, a spicy stew made with pork, coconut milk, and chili peppers. Other notable dishes include kinunot, made with shredded fish (commonly stingray or shark) cooked in coconut milk with spices and chili; sinanglay, a dish of fish simmered in coconut milk with vegetables; and kandingga, consisting of chopped pork offal sautéed with garlic, onions, vinegar, and chilies.

Bicolano noodle dishes include kinalas from Naga City, a noodle soup made from meat scraped from pork or beef head and offal, and pancit Bato from Bato, Camarines Sur, a stir-fried dish using sun-dried wheat noodles.

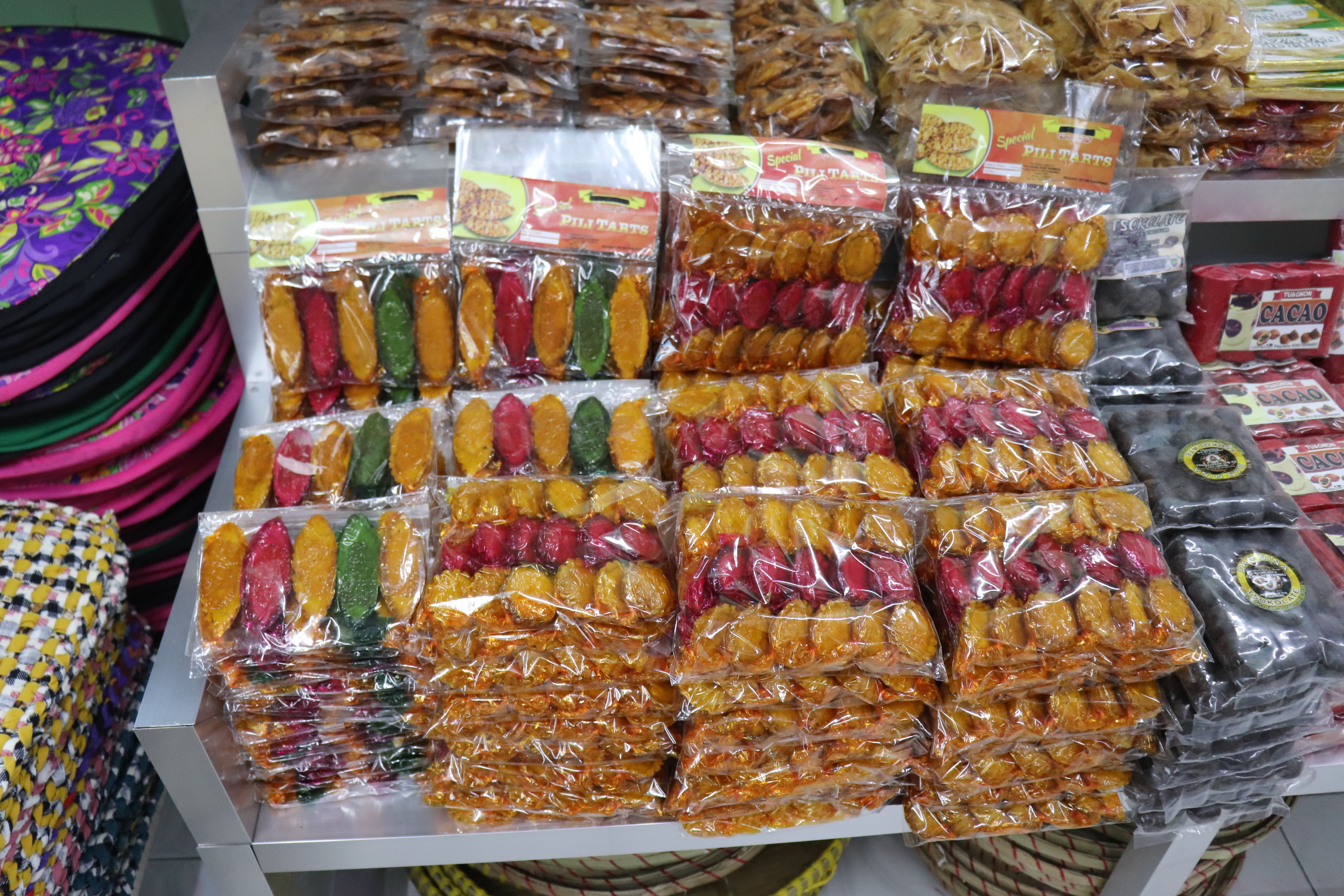
Pili nut candies, sweet confections made from roasted pili nuts from Camarines Sur.

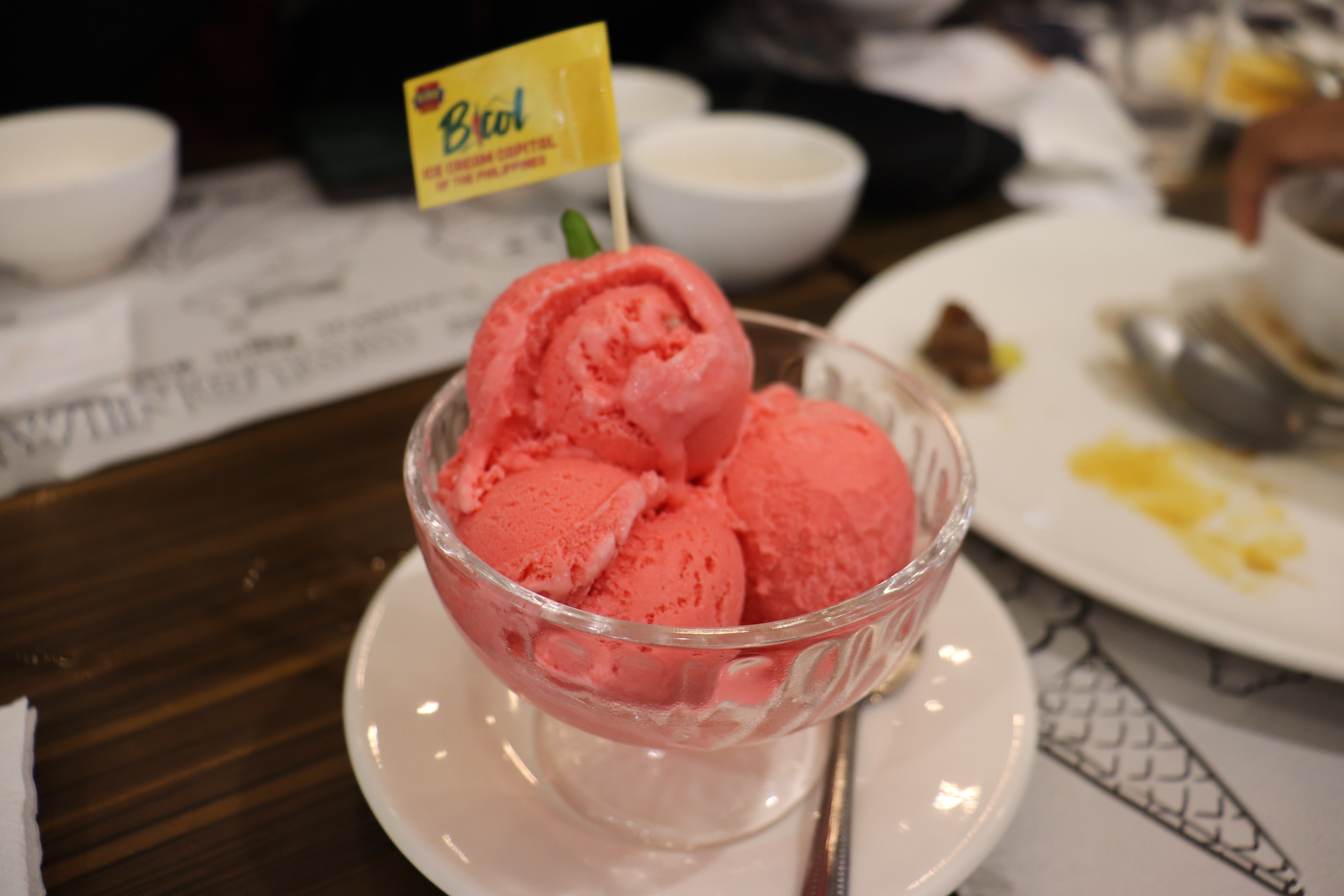
Sili ice cream, an ice cream flavored with chili peppers for a spicy-sweet taste.

The region is also known for desserts and delicacies made with pili nuts, such as pili tarts, pili nuts candies, caramelized pili nuts, and pili marzipan, as well as biniribid a twisted rice dough fritters; binutong a glutinous rice with coconut cream wrapped in leaves; carmadelo, a carabao milk candy similar to pastillas from the town of Milagros, Masbate; sili ice cream a chili-flavored ice cream, and pinakro a saba bananas cooked in coconut milk and sugar.

=== Visayas ===
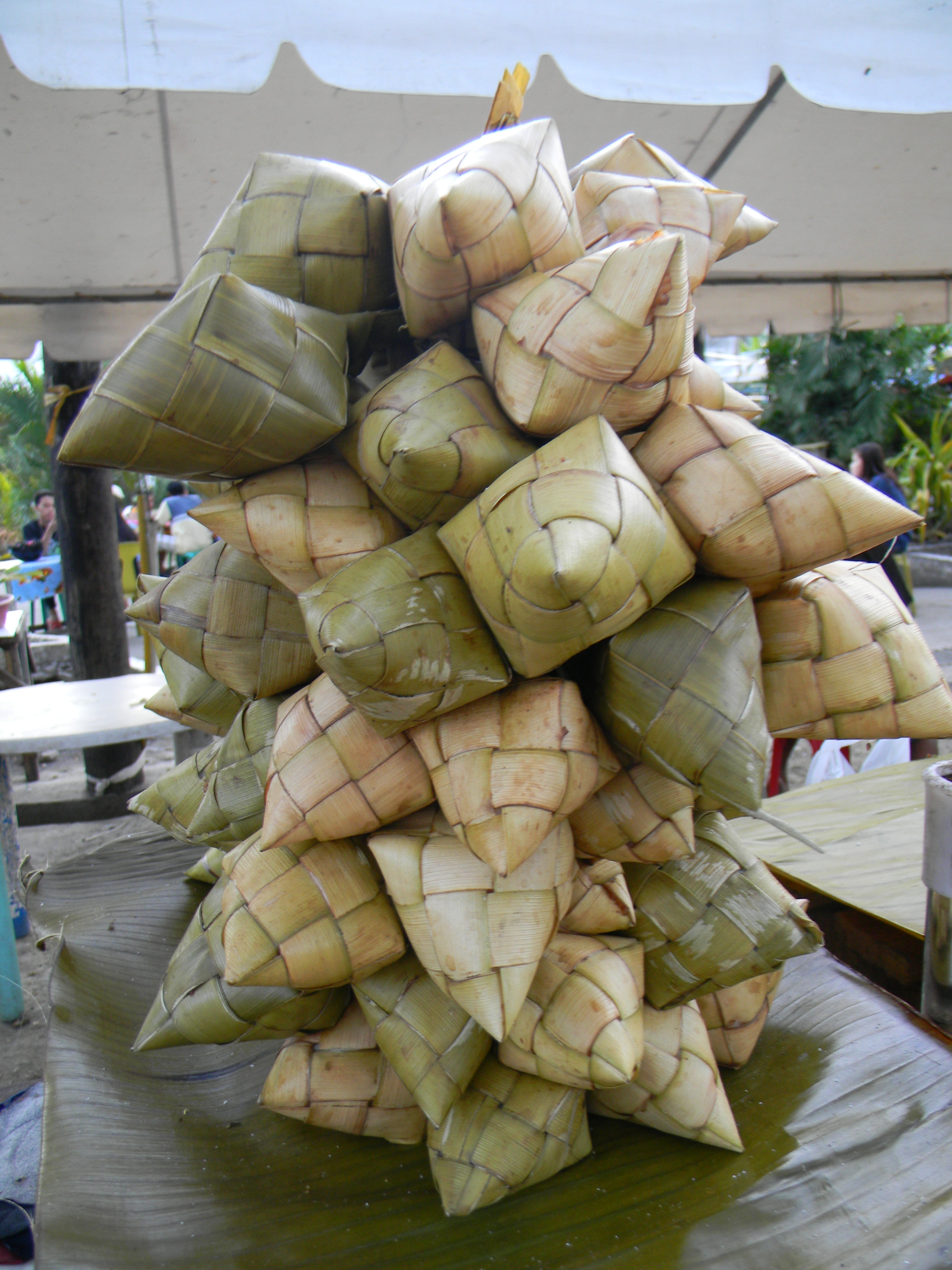
Pusô, a Cebuano delicacy of rice cooked and wrapped in woven coconut leaves.

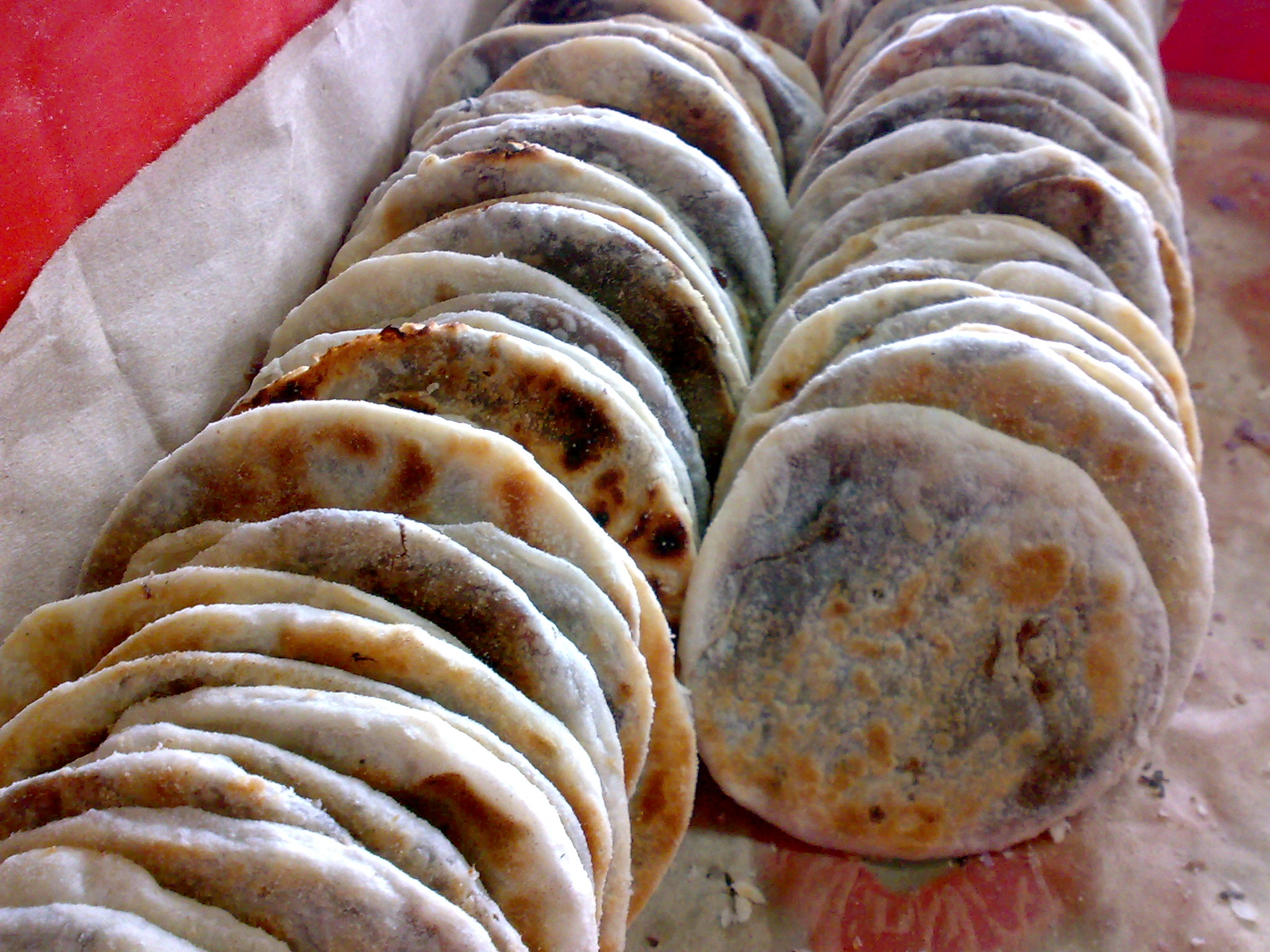
Piaya, a Filipino flat pastry filled with muscovado sugar, popular in Bacolod City.

In Visayas, another souring agent in dishes in the form of batuan (Garcinia binucao) is used. It is a fruit that is greenish, yellowish, somewhat rounded, and four centimeters or more in diameter. They have a firm outer covering and contain a very acid pulp and several seeds.

Tultul, a type of rock salt, is another ingredient made only in Guimaras, where it is sprinkled on cooked rice to serve as a side dish. The salt is an assortment of reeds, twigs and small pieces of bamboo carried to the shore by the sea tide where they have been soaked in seawater for some time and is then burned in large quantities while continually being doused with salt water on a daily basis. The ashes then is strained continuously by kaings and are then cooked in pans.

Bacolod is the capital of Negros Occidental. There are a plethora of restaurants in Bacolod that serve delicious local dishes which are popular with visitors. It is known for inasal which literally translates to "cooked over fire". The "chicken inasal" is a local version of chicken barbecue. It is cooked with red achuete or annatto seeds giving it a reddish color, and brushed with oil and cooked over the fire. The city is also famous for various delicacies such as piaya, napoleones and pinasugbo (deep-fried and caramelled banana sprinkled with sesame seeds).

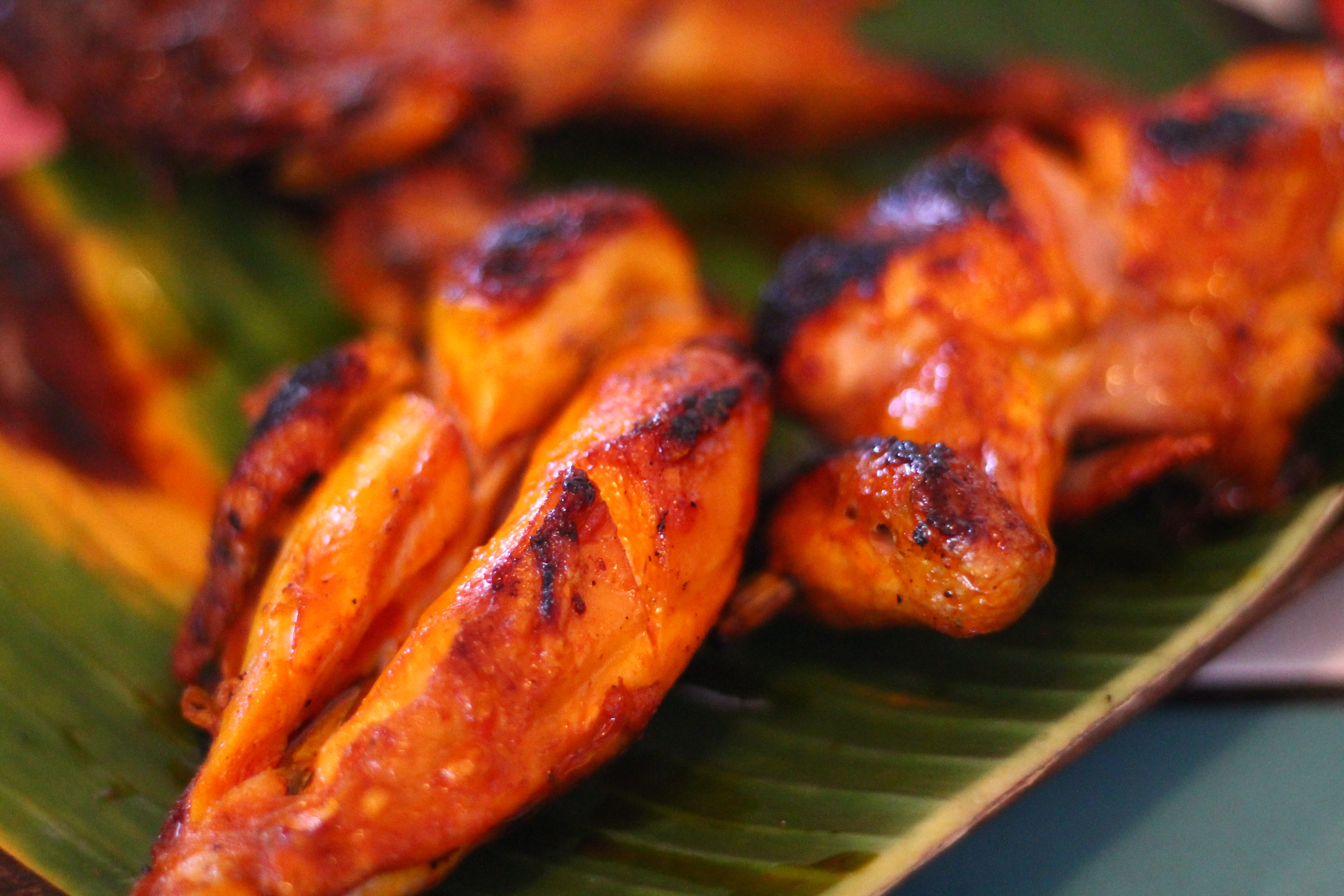
Chicken inasal, a Filipino grilled chicken dish originating from Bacolod City.

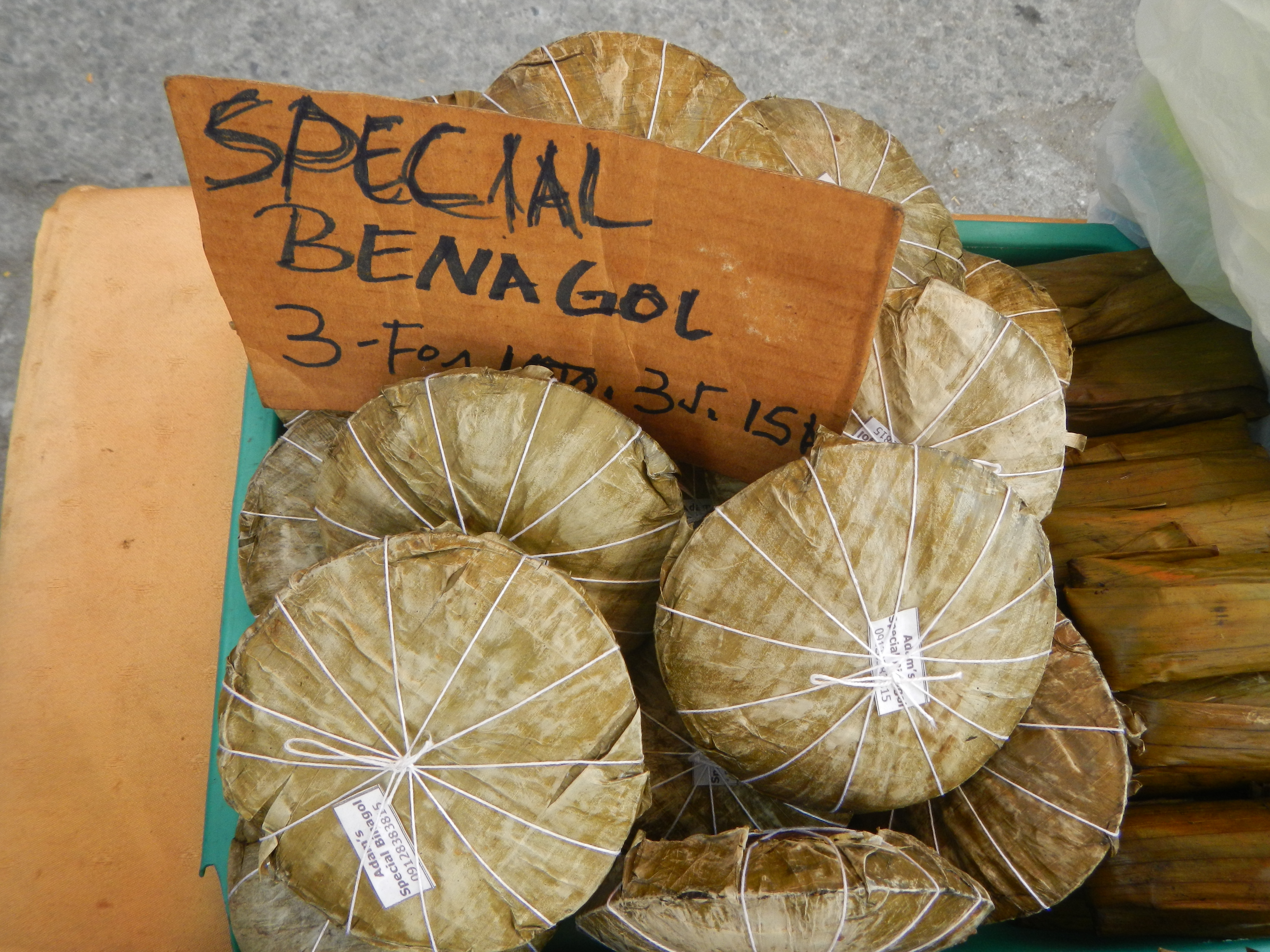
Binagol, a delicacy from Leyte made from mashed taro and coconut milk, steamed in coconut shells.

Leyte is home to Binagol, Carabao Milk Pastillas, Suman Latik and Moron (food). Taclobanon cuisine is made unique by the wide use of kinagod (grated coconut) and hatok (coconut milk). It is common to find hinatokan (dishes integrated in coconut milk) dishes in the city. Humba is said to have originated from the province since the taste in the region's cuisine distinctly has a slightly sweeter taste than the rest of the country. Because Leyte borders the sea, it is common to find multiple seafood dishes in the province. Masag (crab), tilang (scallops) and pasayan (shrimp) are common sea food in the region. Waray taste varies, allowing each family/angkan (clan) to create unique recipes. Other native delicacies from the province are Roskas (hard cookies made from lard, anise, flour, sugar, butter and eggs) and Bukayo (coconut strip candies).

Aklan is synonymous with inubarang manok, chicken cooked with ubad (banana pith), as well as binakol na manok, chicken cooked in coconut water with lemongrass. Of particular interest is tamilok (shipworm), which is either eaten raw or dipped in an acidic sauce such as vinegar or calamansi. There is a special prevalence of chicken and coconut milk (gata) in Akeanon cooking.

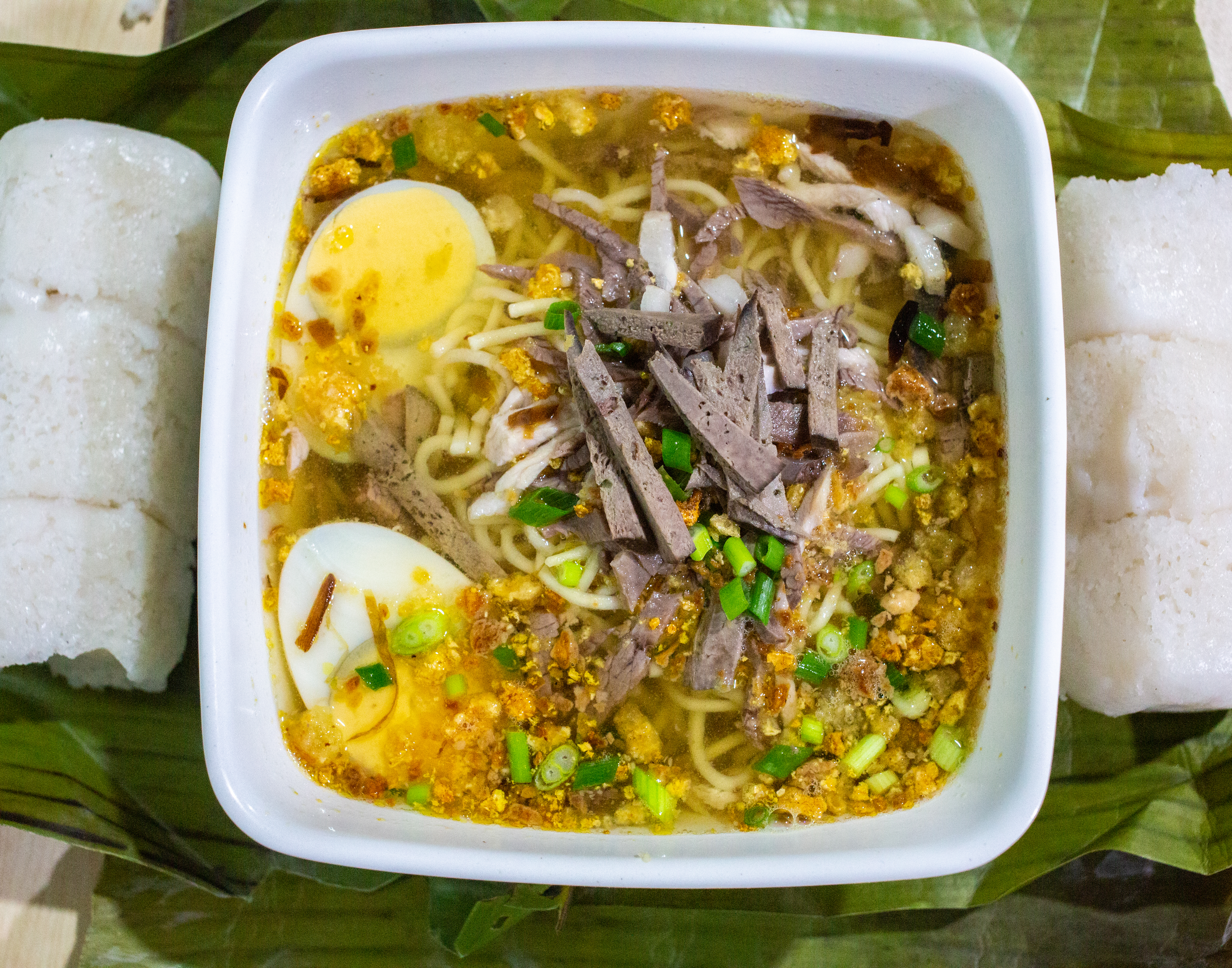
Batchoy, or "La Paz Batchoy", a Filipino noodle dish native to La Paz district in Iloilo.

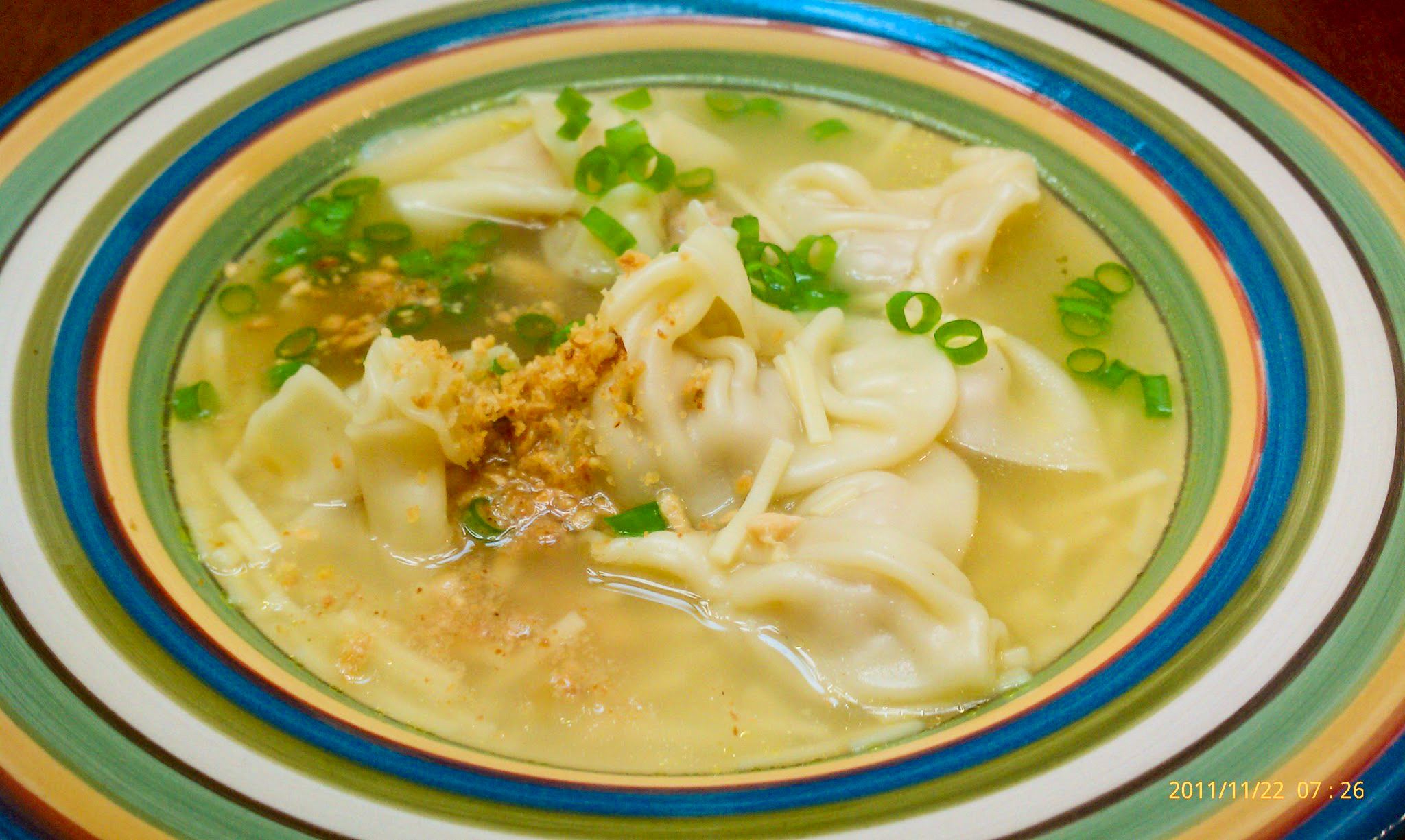
Pancit molo, a wonton soup from Iloilo, featuring meat-filled dumplings in a savory broth.

Iloilo is home of the batchoy, derived from "ba-chui" meaning pieces of meat in Hokkien Chinese. The authentic batchoy contains fresh egg noodles called miki, buto-buto broth slow-cooked for hours, and beef, pork and bulalo mixed with the local guinamos (shrimp paste). Toppings include generous amounts of fried garlic, crushed chicharon, scallions, slices of pork intestines and liver. Another type of pancit which is found in the said province is pancit Molo, an adaptation of wonton soup and is a specialty of the town of Molo, a well-known district in Iloilo. Unlike other pancit, pancit Molo is not dry but soupy and it does not make use of long, thin noodles but instead wonton wrappers made from rice flour. Iloilo is also famous for its two kadios or pigeon pea-based soups. The first is KBL or kadios baboy langka.

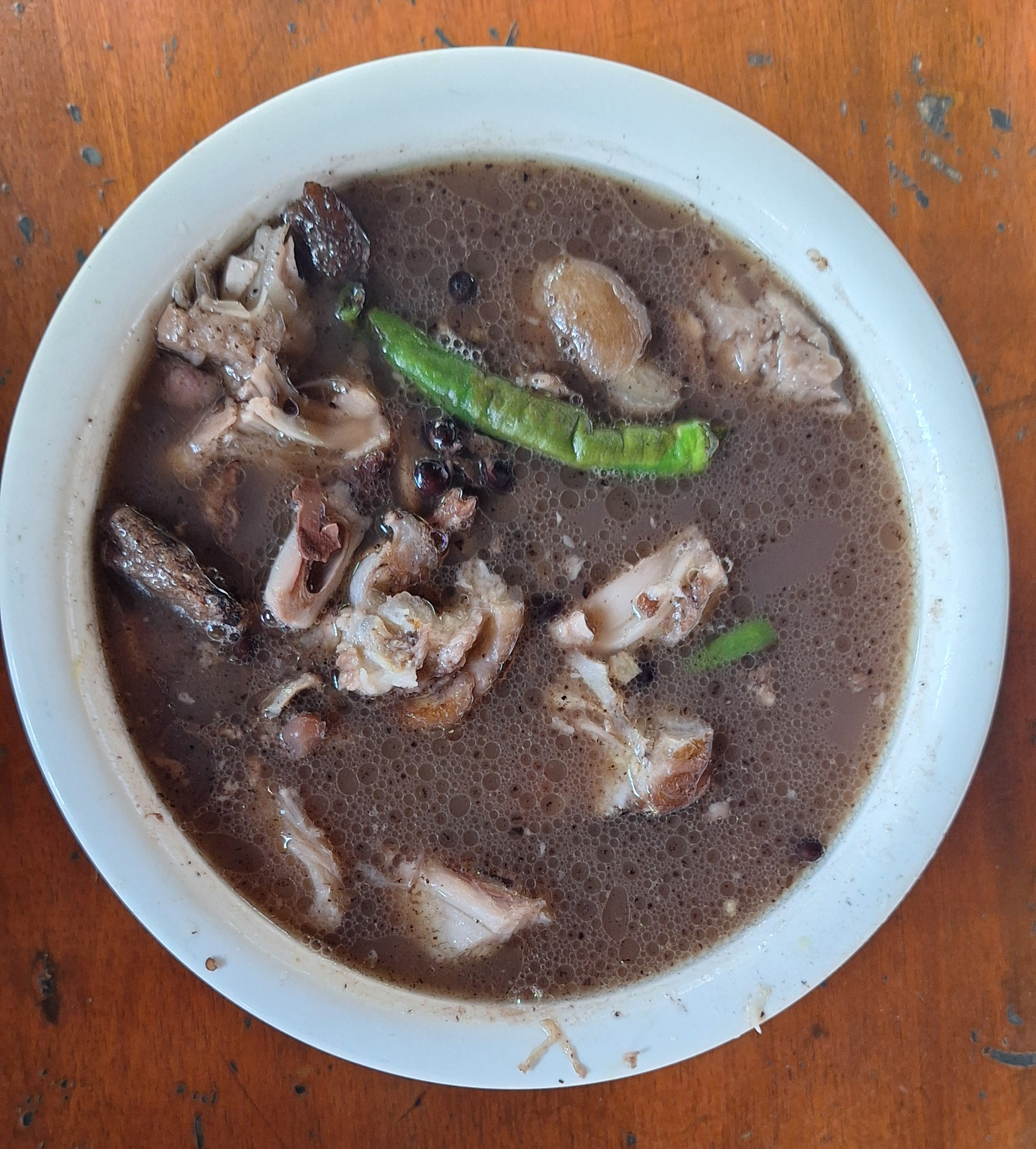
KBL (Kadios, Baboy, Langka), a stew made with pigeon peas, pork, and jackfruit.

As the name implies, the three main ingredients of this dish are kadyos, baboy (pork), and langka (unripe jackfruit is used here). Another one is KMU or kadios manok ubad. This dish is composed mainly of kadyos, manok (preferably free range chicken called Bisaya nga manok in Iloilo), and ubad (thinly cut white core of the banana stalk/trunk). Both of these dishes utilize another Ilonggo ingredient as a souring agent. This ingredient is batwan, or Garcinia binucao, a fruit closely related to mangosteen, which is very popular in Western Visayas and neighbouring Negros Island, but is generally unknown to other parts of the Philippines.

Roxas City is another food destination in Western Visayas aside from Iloilo City and Kalibo. This coastal city, about two to three hours by bus from Iloilo City, prides itself as the "Seafood Capital of the Philippines" due to its bountiful rivers, estuaries and seas. Numerous seafood dishes are served in the city's Baybay area such as mussels, oysters, scallops, prawns, seaweeds, clams, fishes and many more.

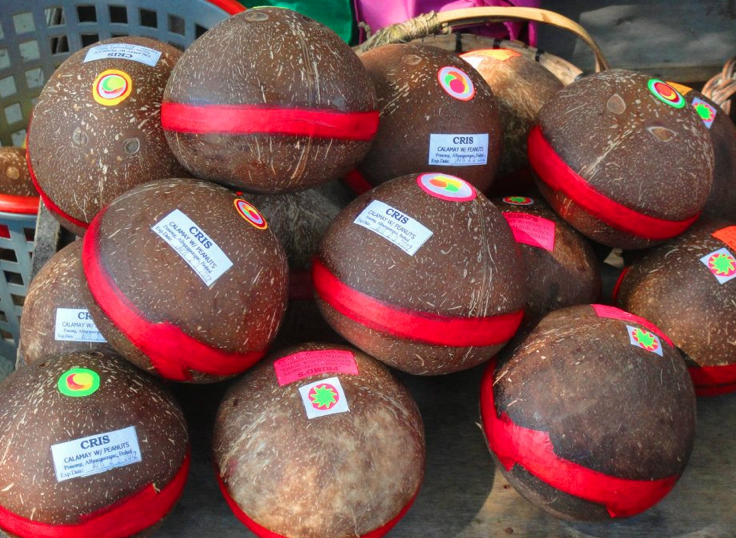
Bohol kalamay, made from glutinous rice, coconut milk, and brown sugar, traditionally packed in coconut shells.

In Bohol, kalamay is popular. In Palawan, crocodile meat is boiled, cured, and turned into tocinos. In Romblon, a specialty dish is pounded and flavored shrimp meat and rice cooked inside banana leaves.

Cebu is known for its lechón variant. Lechon prepared "Cebu style" is characterized by a crisp outer skin and a moist juicy meat with a unique taste given by a blend of spices. Cebu is also known for sweets like dried mangoes and caramel tarts.

=== Mindanao ===
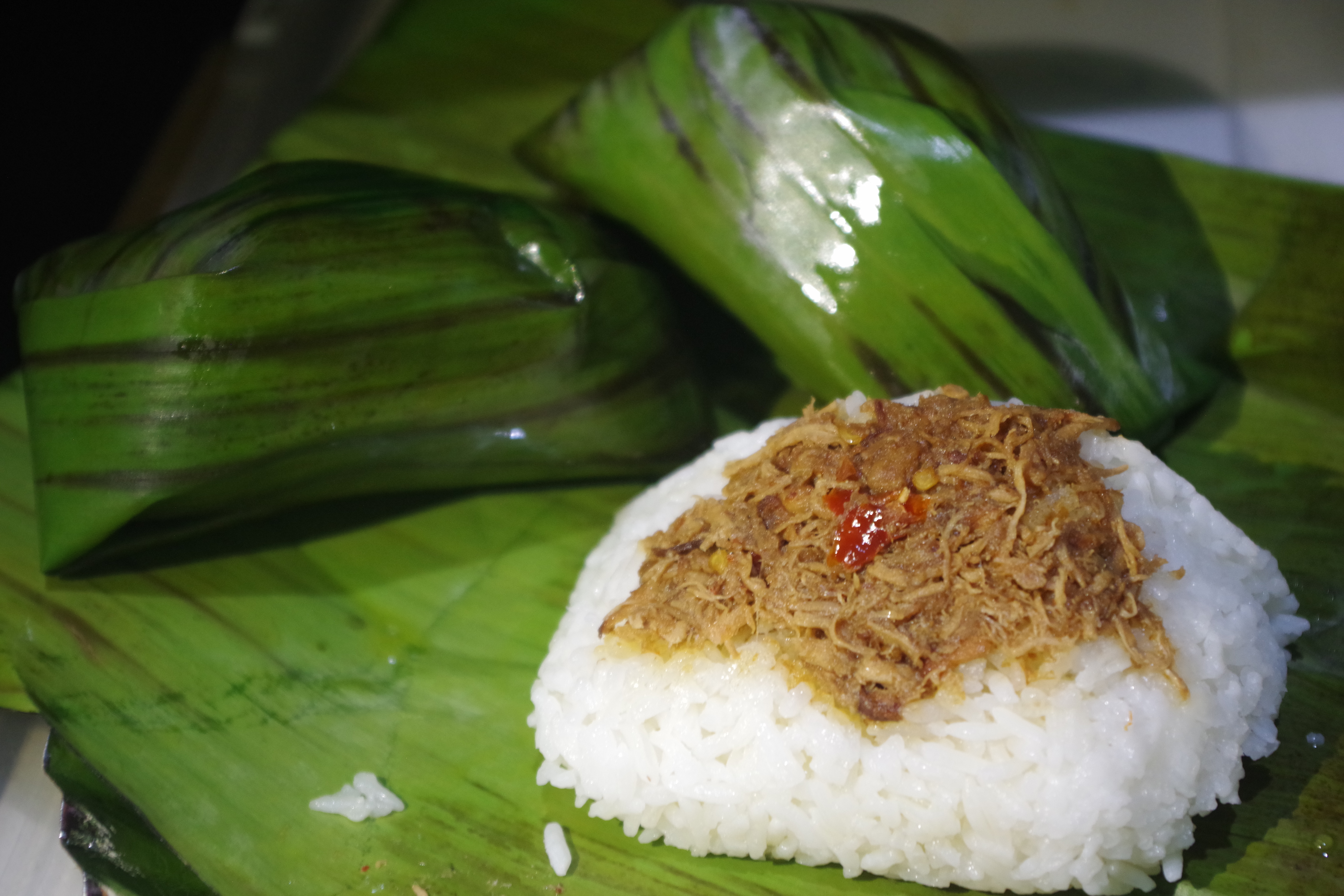
Chicken Pastil, packed rice dish originating from the Maguindanaon people.

In Mindanao, the southern part of Palawan island, Sulu and Tawi-Tawi, dishes are richly flavored with the spices common to Southeast Asia: turmeric, coriander, lemon grass, galangal, cumin, zest and/or leaves from varieties of native limes, cinnamon, and chillies—ingredients not commonly used in the rest of Philippine cooking. The cuisine of the indigenous ethnolinguistic nations who are either Christian, Muslim or Lumad peoples of Mindanao and the Sulu archipelago has much in common with the rich and spice-paste centric Malay cuisines of Malaysia and Brunei, as well as Indonesian and Thai cuisine, and other Southeast Asian cuisines.

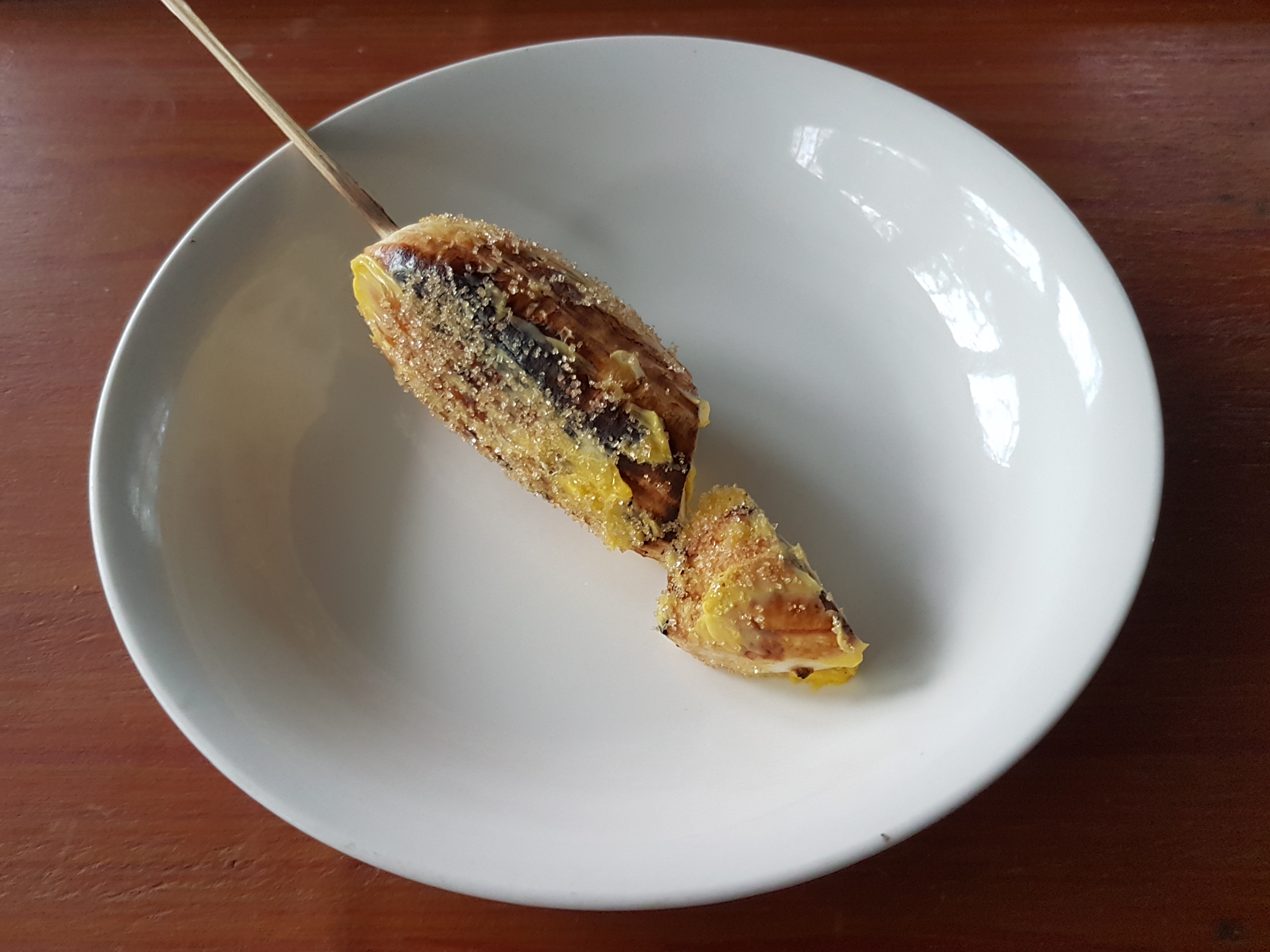
Ginanggang, a snack food made of grilled saba banana with margarine and sugar

Mindanaoan cuisine represents the cultural achievements of prehispanic Philippine cuisine in other most parts of the country immediately prior to Spanish colonization between in the late 16th to early 17th centuries. Hints of similar dishes and flavors can also found in the Bicol region and the Cordilleras, which still prefer a coconut and spice-paste rich palate similar to Mindanao.

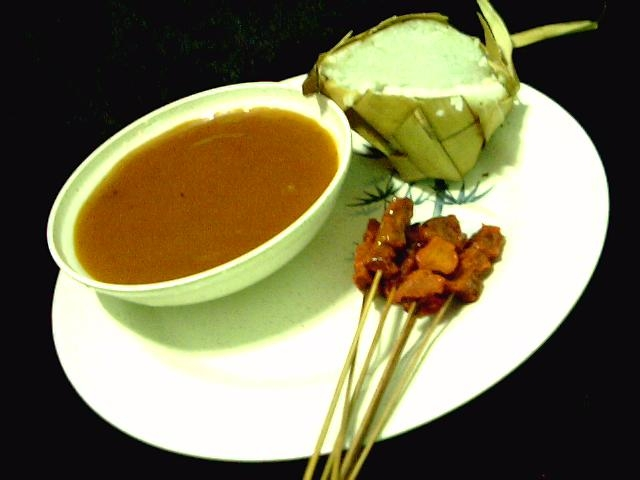
The Southern Philippine dish satti, served with ta'mu rice cakes

Well-known Mindanao and Sulu dishes include satti (satay) and ginataang manok (chicken cooked in spiced coconut milk). Certain parts of Mindanao are predominantly Muslim, where pork is rarely consumed, and lamb, mutton, goat and beef are the main red meats of choice. Rendang is an often-spicy beef curry whose origins derive from the Minangkabau people of Sumatra; biryani, kulma, and kiyoning (pilaf) are dishes originally from the Indian subcontinent, that were given a Mindanaoan touch and served on special occasions.

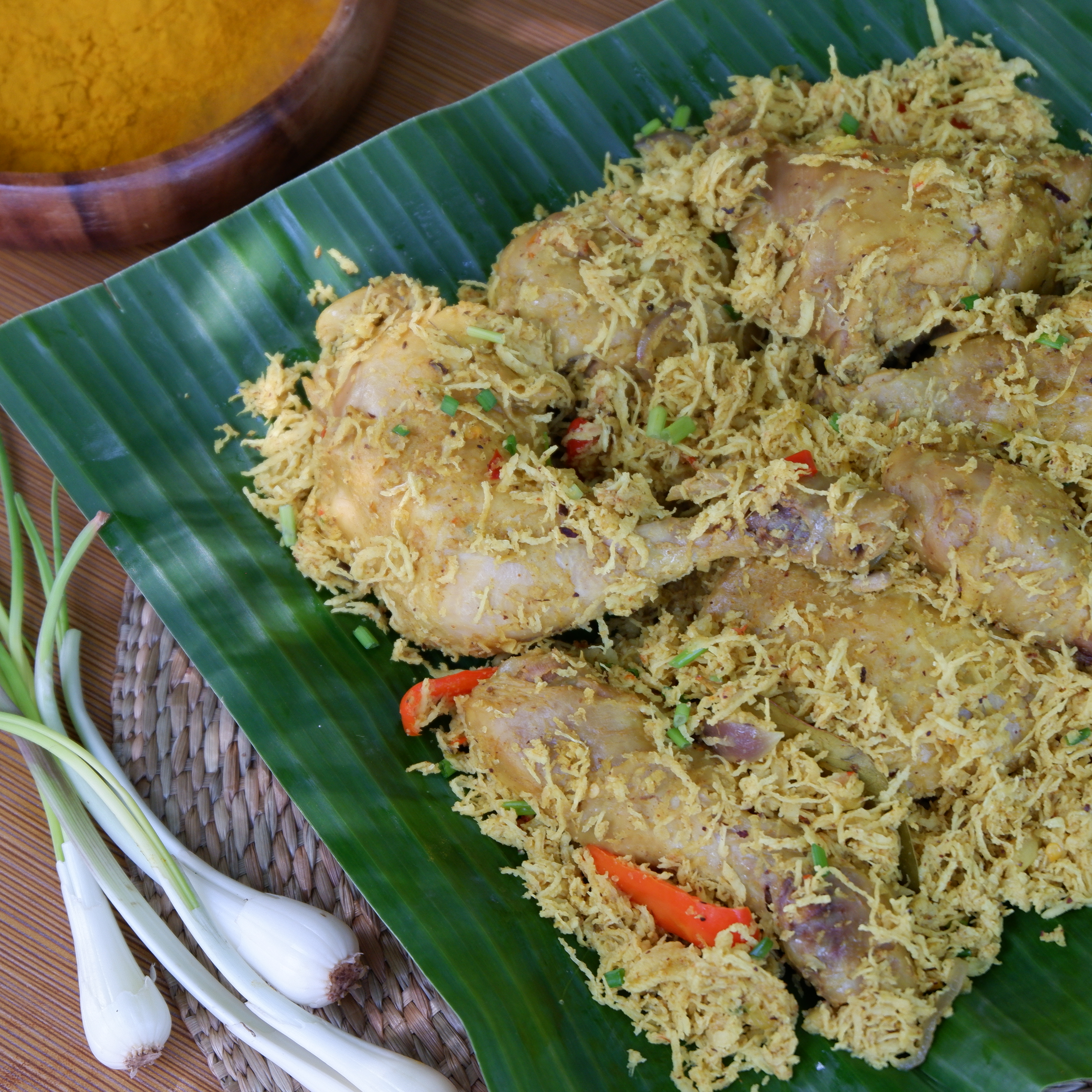
Piaparan, a Maranao dish of chicken or fish cooked in coconut milk with turmeric and spices.

Piyanggang manok is a Tausug dish made from barbecued chicken marinated in spices, and served with coconut milk infused with toasted coconut meat.

Chupá culo and curacha con gatâ are examples of Zamboangueño dishes made from shells cooked with coconut milk and crab with sauce blended in coconut milk with spices, respectively. There are other known Zamboangueño dishes like estofadong baboy, sicalañg, alfajor, endulzao, tamal, paella, arroz a la Valenciana, rebosao, toron, and more.

Popular crops such as cassava root, sweet potatoes, and yams are grown.

Sambal, a spicy sauce made with belacan, tamarind, aromatic spices and chilies, is a popular base of many dishes in the region.

Palapa, is a popular condiment unique to, and widely used in, Maranao and Maguindanaon cuisines, and consists of a base of shredded old coconut, sakurab (a variant of green onion), ginger, galangal, chillies, salt, pepper, and turmeric.

Another popular dish from this region is tiyula itum, a dark broth of beef or chicken lightly flavored with ginger, galangal, chili, turmeric, and toasted coconut flesh (which gives it its dark color).

Lamaw (Buko salad), is a mixture of young coconut, its juice, milk or orange juice, with ice.

== Vegetables ==
Vegetables are a prominent component of Filipino cuisine, reflecting the country's long-standing agricultural traditions and the variety of crops commonly grown in rural households, often associated with the bahay kubo (traditional nipa hut). Vegetable dishes are usually cooked simply steamed, boiled, or blanched to keep their natural flavor. They can also be grilled, sautéed, stewed, fried, or pickled, and are often seasoned with salt, coconut milk, vinegar, soy sauce, and fermented fish products such as patis, bagoong alamang, and bagoong isda.

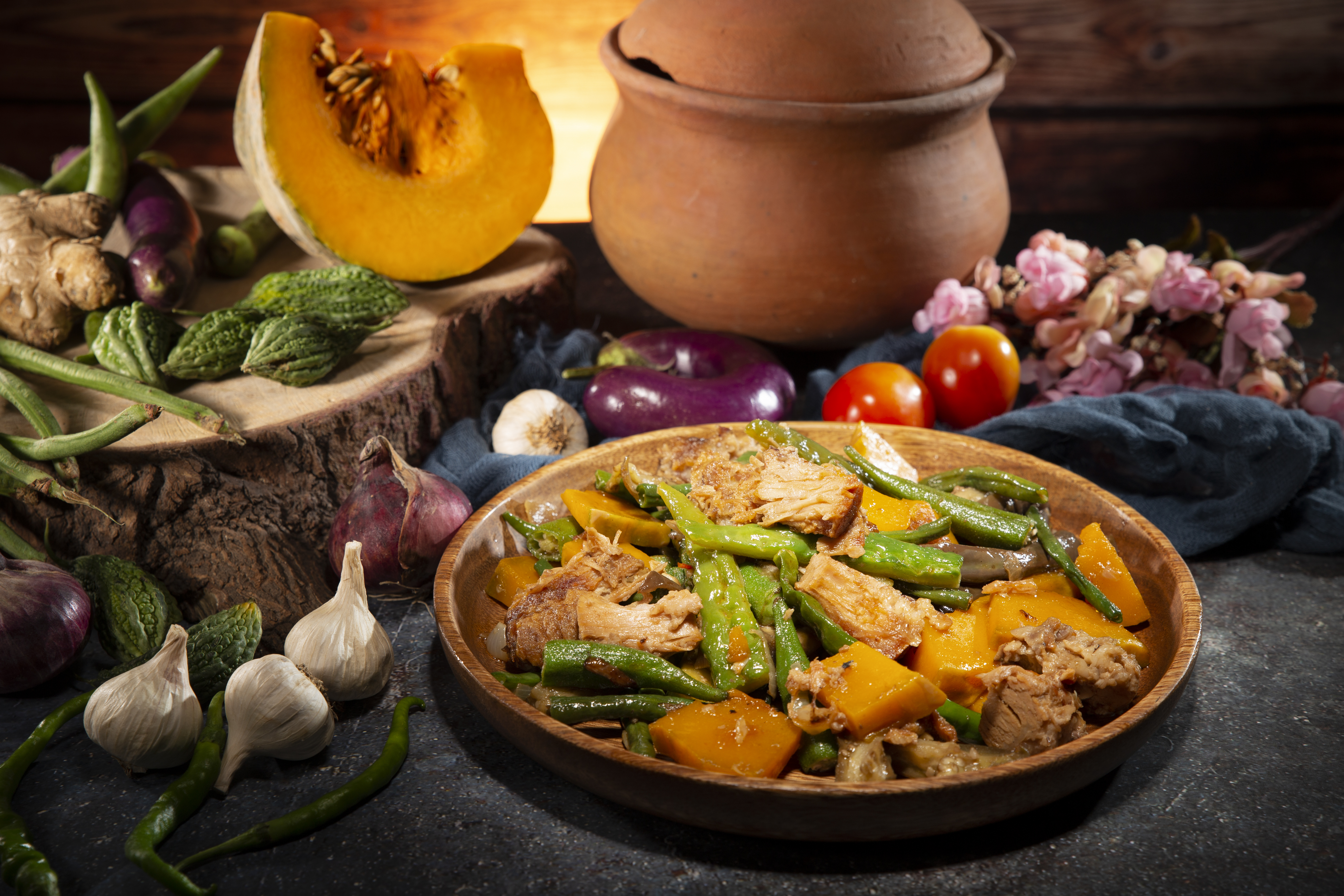
Pinakbet, a Ilocano vegetable stew made with vegetables and flavored with bagoong isda.

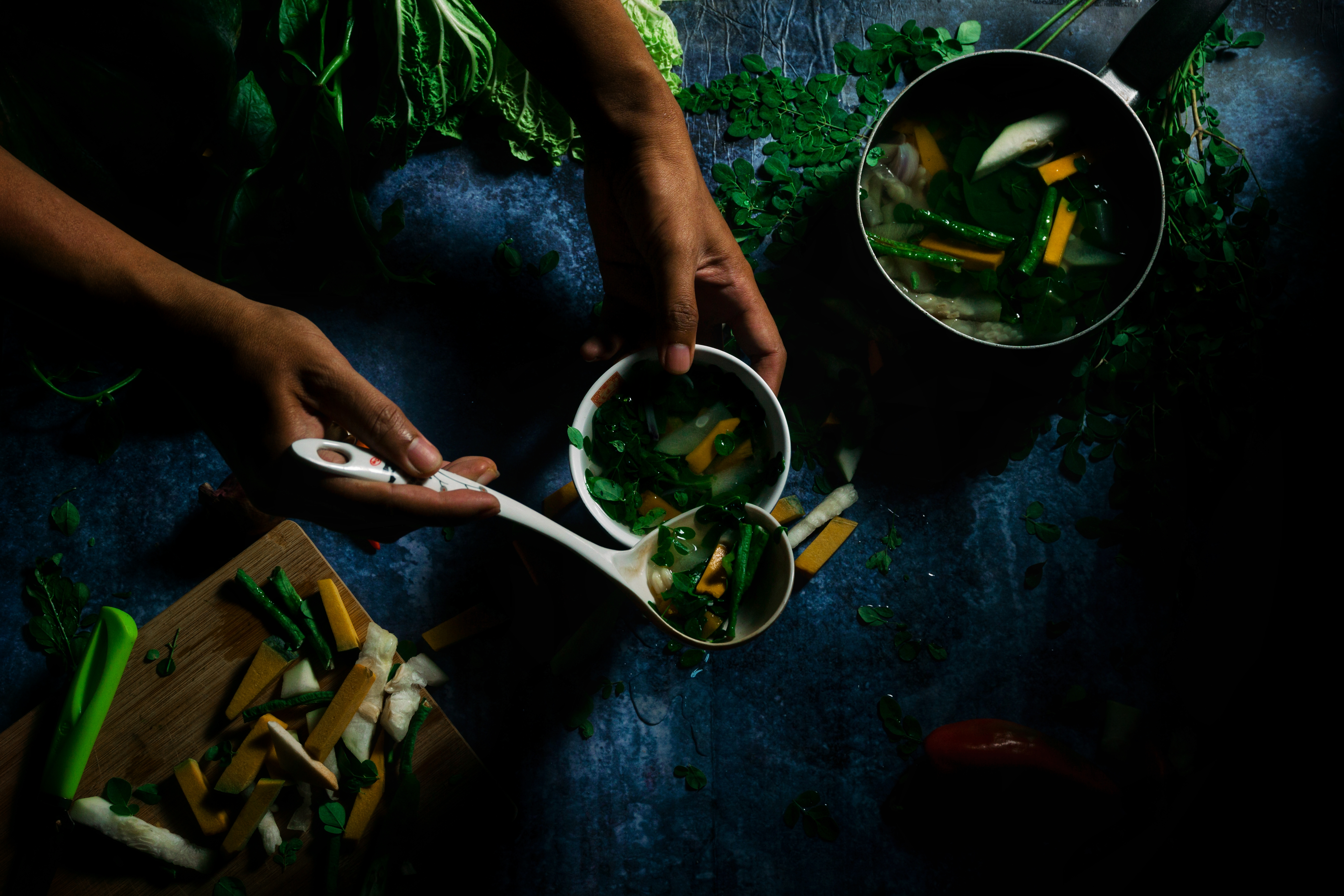
Utan Bisaya, a Visayan vegetable soup made with leafy greens and assorted vegetables.

Sinabawang gulay is a traditional vegetable soup typically seasoned with salt or patis and made from leafy greens such as malunggay, saluyot, mustasa, pechay, and chili leaves, along with eggplant, okra, squash (kalabasa), and long beans (sitaw). It is known by various regional names, including bulanglang in South-Central Luzon, gule magalang in Pampanga, laswa in Western Visayas, and law-oy or utan in parts of the Visayas and Mindanao.

In Northern Luzon, it is closely related to dinengdeng or inabraw, which differ primarily in the use of bagoong isda as a seasoning, giving the dish a distinct savory and earthy flavor. A variation known as buridibod includes sweet potatoes and moringa pods. These dishes are often accompanied by smoked or fried fish, seafood, or dried shrimp.

Pinakbet is a classic Filipino vegetable dish known for its savory and earthy flavors. It typically consists of a variety of vegetables such as bitter melon, eggplant, long beans, and okra. The authentic Ilocano version includes sweet potatoes and legumes, seasoned with bagoong isda, and is traditionally cooked by combining all ingredients without prior sautéing. In contrast, Tagalog versions often incorporate squash (kalabasa) and shrimp paste (bagoong alamang), with the ingredients sautéed before simmering. Regional variations may also include the addition of coconut milk, particularly in parts of Southern Luzon, Bicol, and the Visayas, as well as the addition of seafood in Pampanga.

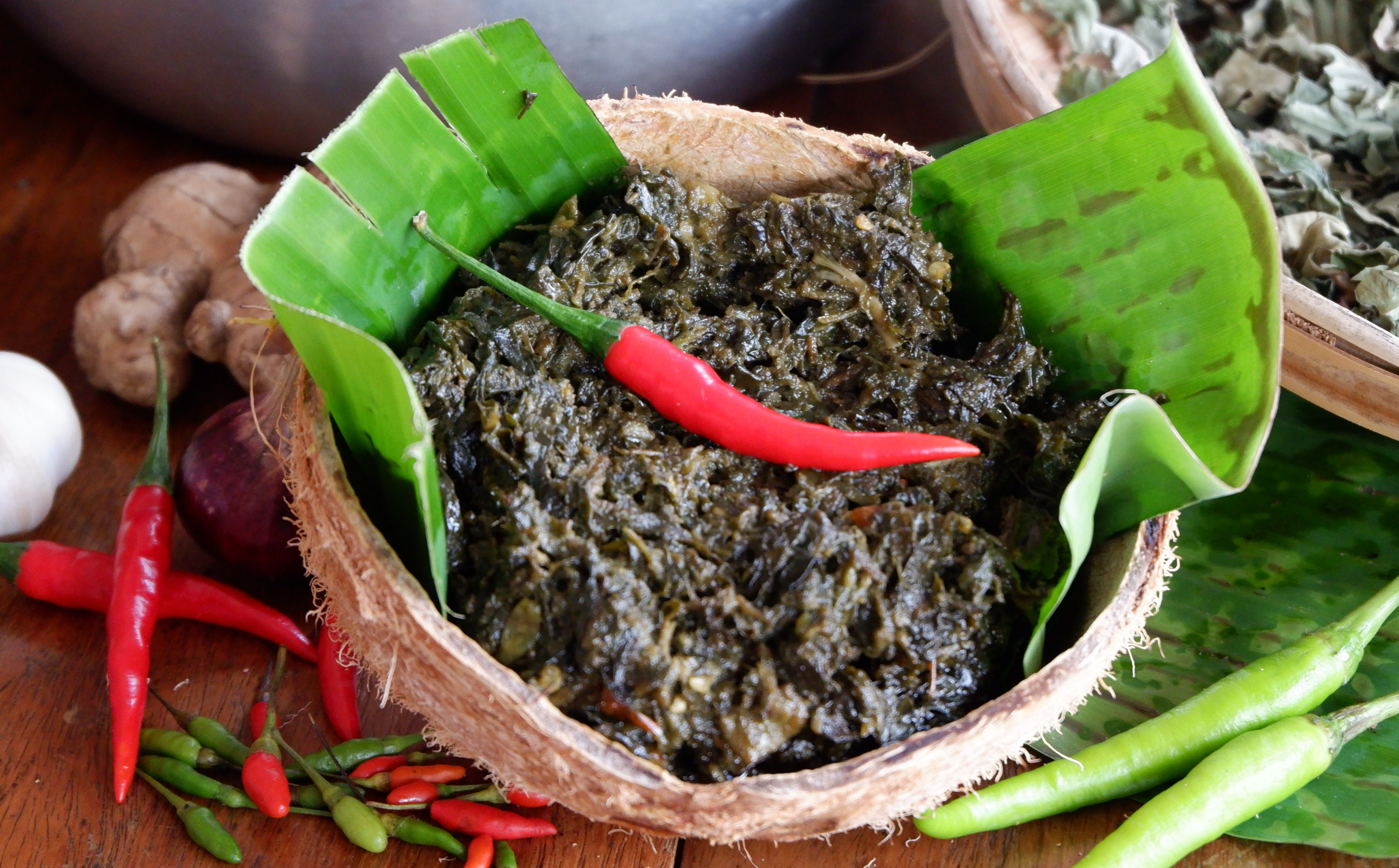
Laing, a Bicolano dish made from dried taro leaves cooked in coconut milk and spices.

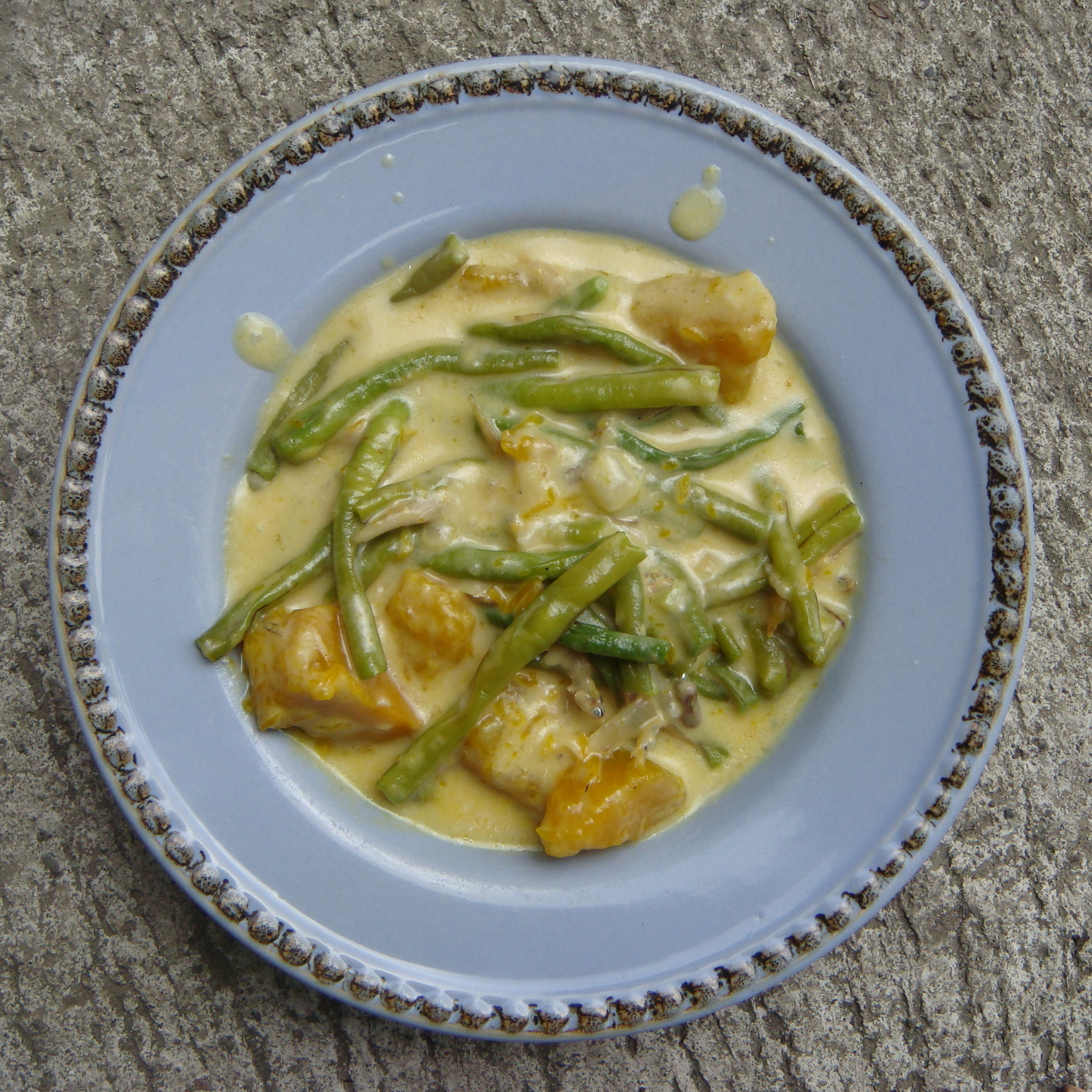
Ginataang kalabasa, a vegetable stew made from calabaza in coconut milk and spices.

Ginataan is a general term for dishes cooked in coconut milk. One of the most well-known examples is laing or pinangat, a Bicolano dish made from dried taro leaves, often combined with taro stems or tubers, and cooked in coconut milk with spices such as ginger, lemongrass, and chili peppers. Numerous vegetable-based variations of ginataan exist, including ginataang kalabasa (squash and long beans), ginataang langka (jackfruit), ginataang ampalaya (bitter melon), ginataang labong (bamboo shoots), and ginataang puso ng saging (banana blossom). Lawot-lawot, a coconut milk dish from Cebu and Mindanao, consists of mixed vegetables in a viscous broth, usually thickened by okra, loofah, and other slimy ingredients.

In Pampanga and Nueva Ecija, gising-gising is a related dish made from winged beans cooked in coconut milk and typically seasoned with shrimp paste and chili. In the provinces of Laguna and Quezon, kulawo refers to vegetable dishes such as kulawong talong (roasted eggplant) or kulawong puso ng saging (banana blossom), seasoned with onion, salt, vinegar, black pepper, and coconut milk.

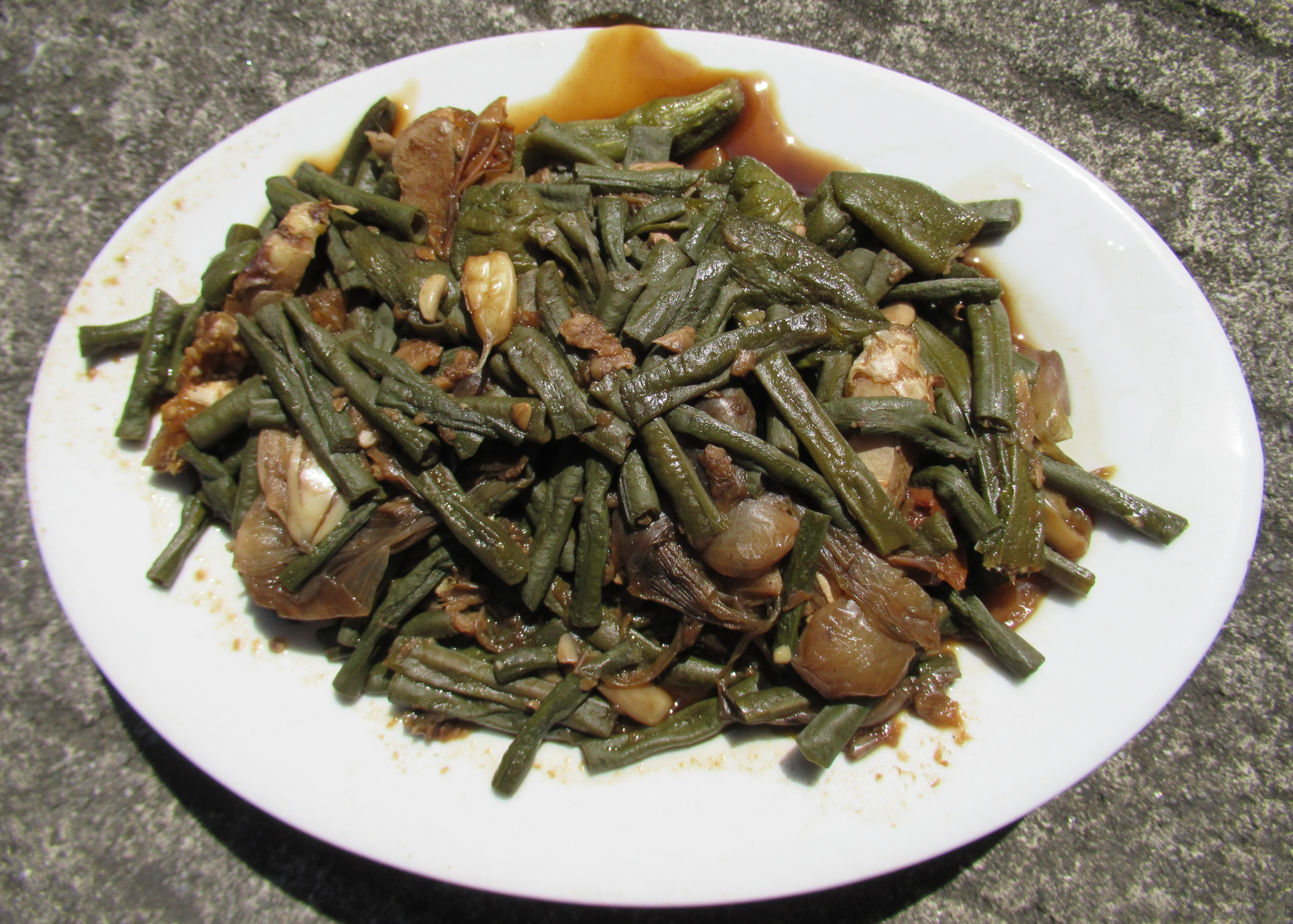
Adobong sitaw, a long beans cooked in vinegar, soy sauce, and garlic.

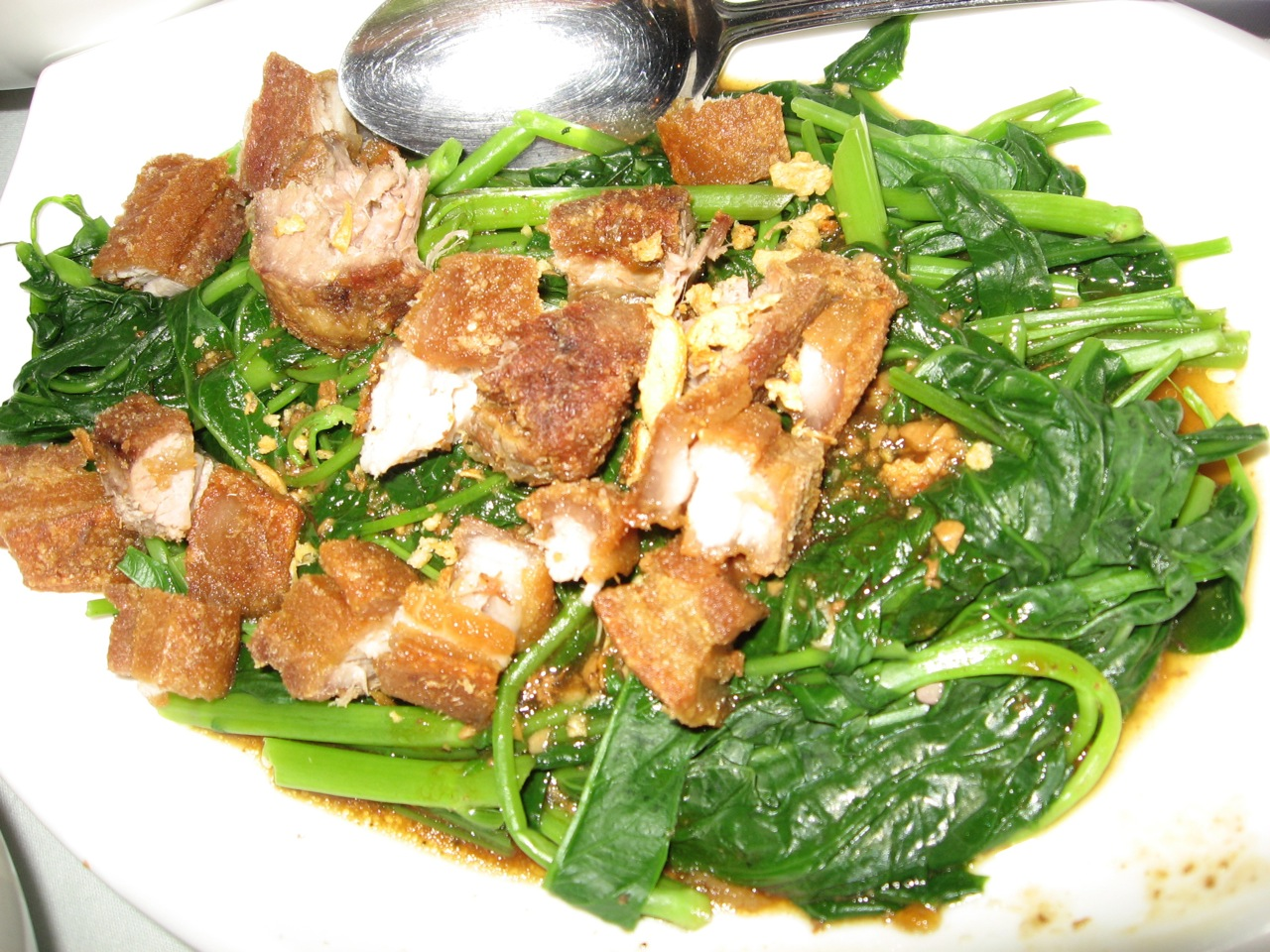
Adobong kangkong a water spinach sautéed in garlic, vinegar, and soy sauce.

Adobo-based vegetable dishes adapt the traditional adobo cooking method braising in soy sauce, vinegar, garlic, and black pepper, to vegetables such as water spinach (adobong kangkong) and long beans (adobong sitaw). Paksiw-based vegetable dishes, in contrast, are prepared by simmering vegetables like eggplant, okra, bitter melon (ampalaya), and green chili peppers in vinegar with spices, producing a distinctively sour flavor. In Pampanga, a related dish known as paksing demonyu features mixed vegetables stewed in vinegar. In Northern Luzon, the Ilocano dish tinimtim similarly features leafy vegetables such as saluyot (jute mallow) cooked in vinegar.

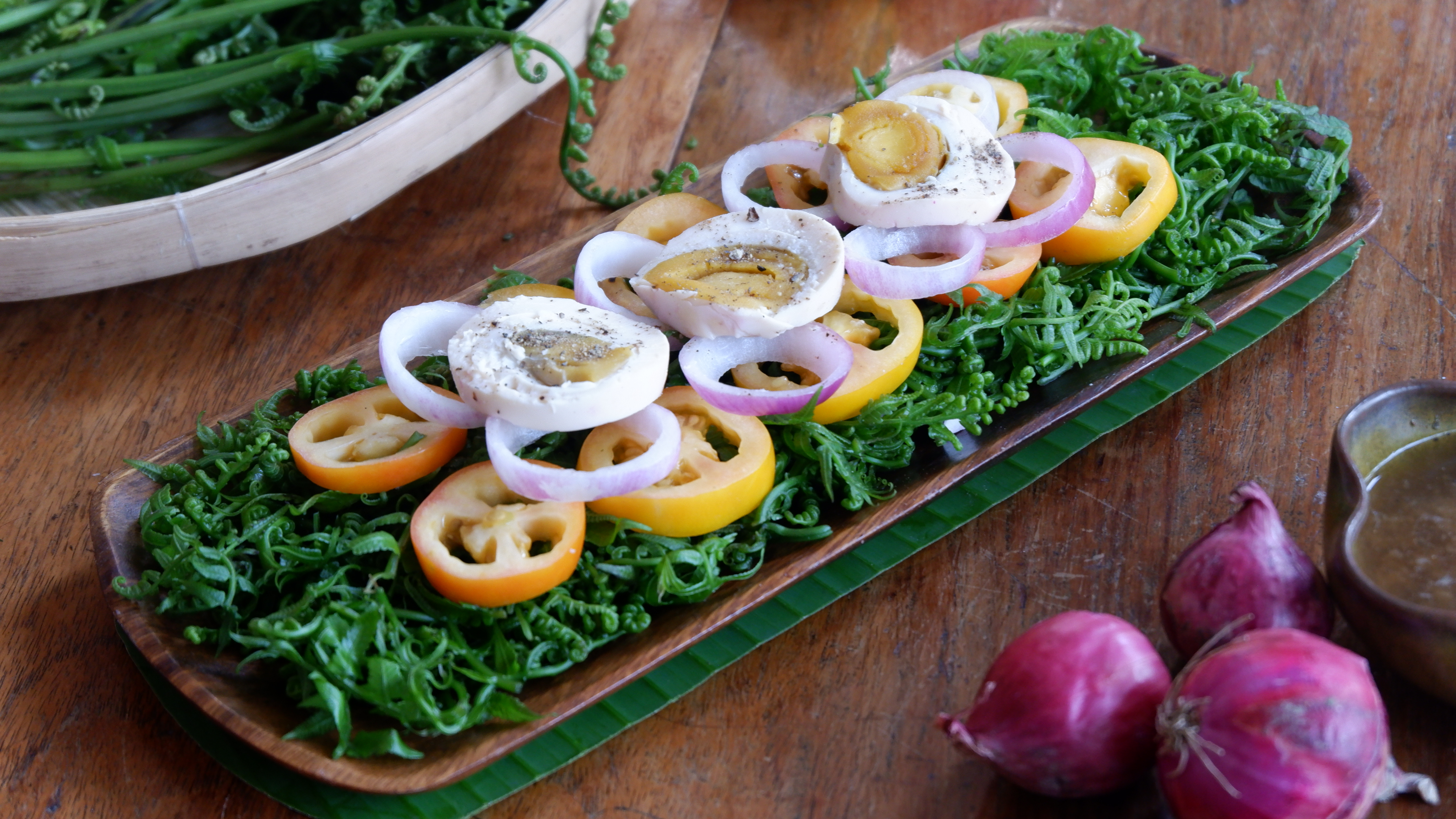
Ensaladang pako, a fern salad with tomatoes and salted egg.

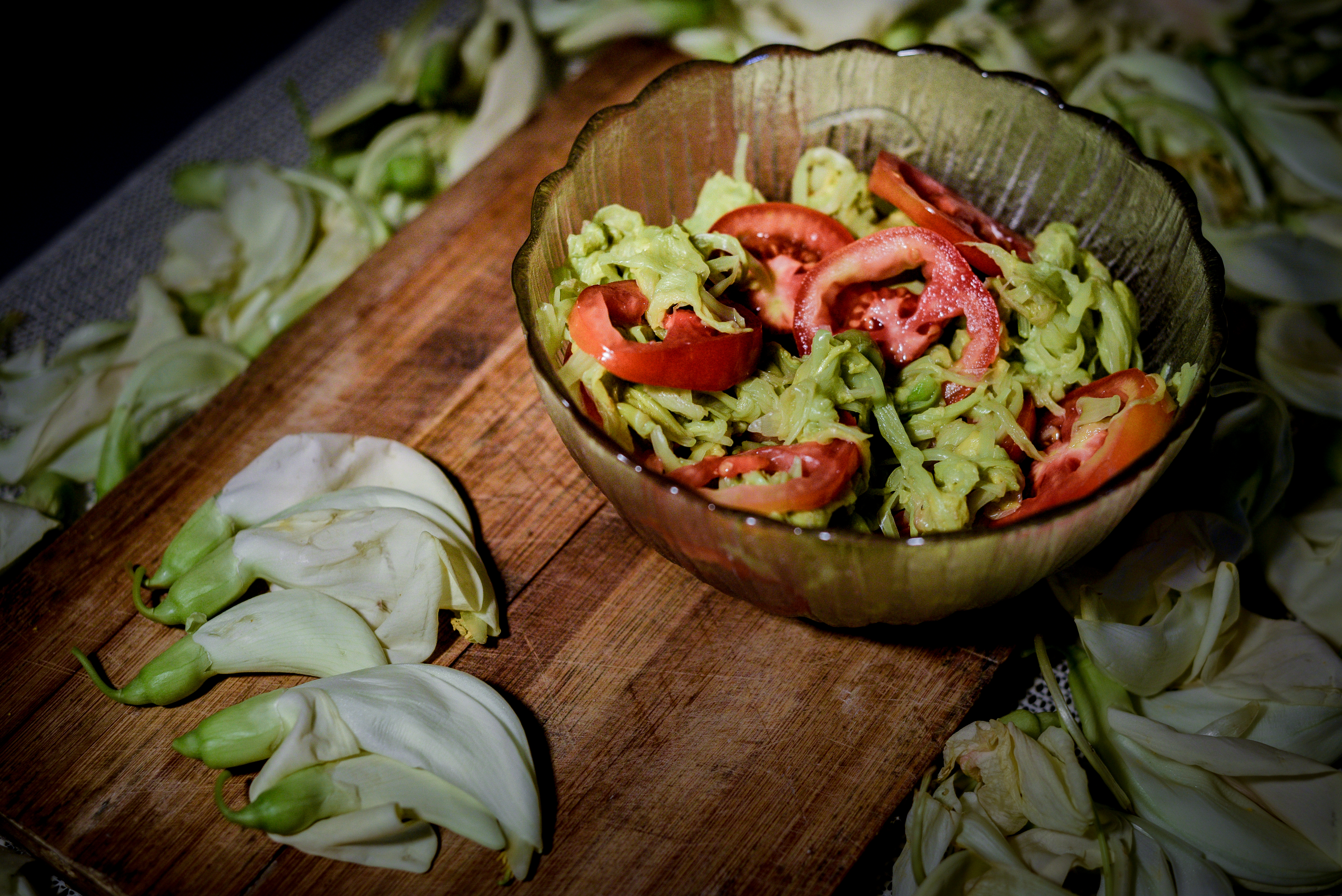
Kinilnat, made from katuray dressed with tomatoes, onions, and bagoong isda.

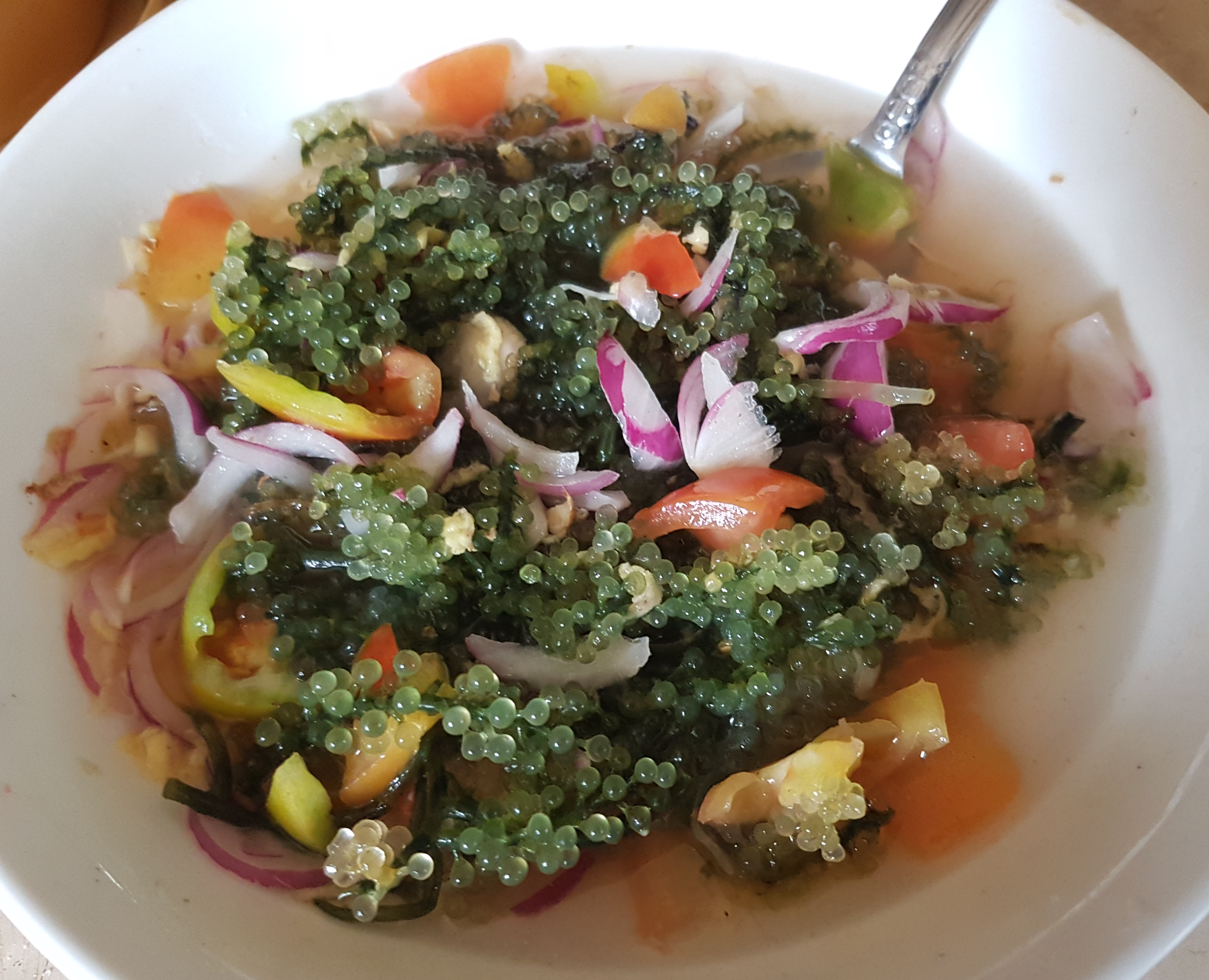
Ensaladang lato, a sea grapes salad with tomatoes, onions, and vinegar.

Ensalada, derived from the Spanish word for “salad,” refers to a category of dishes that typically function as side dishes or palate cleansers. These dishes commonly consist of fresh, blanched, or grilled vegetables paired with ingredients such as tomatoes, green mangoes, onions, vinegar, or bagoong alamang. Examples include ensaladang talong, made from grilled or blanched eggplant with tomatoes and bagoong; ensaladang itlog na maalat, which combines tomatoes, onions, and salted eggs; and ensaladang ampalaya, prepared from blanched bitter melon.

In Ilocos Region, similar dishes are known as kinilnat, which typically feature blanched leafy vegetables, blossoms, and shoots—such as katuray, moringa flowers, ferns, ballaiba, okra, and sweet potato leaves—dressed with a mixture commonly referred to as KBL (kamatis, bugguong, and lasona). Seaweed-based salads are also common, such as ensaladang lato or arosep (sea grapes) mixed with tomatoes, onions, and vinegar. Other edible seaweeds include guso in the Visayas and Mindanao, particularly in Tawi-Tawi, and pokpoklo or guraman in Ilocos.

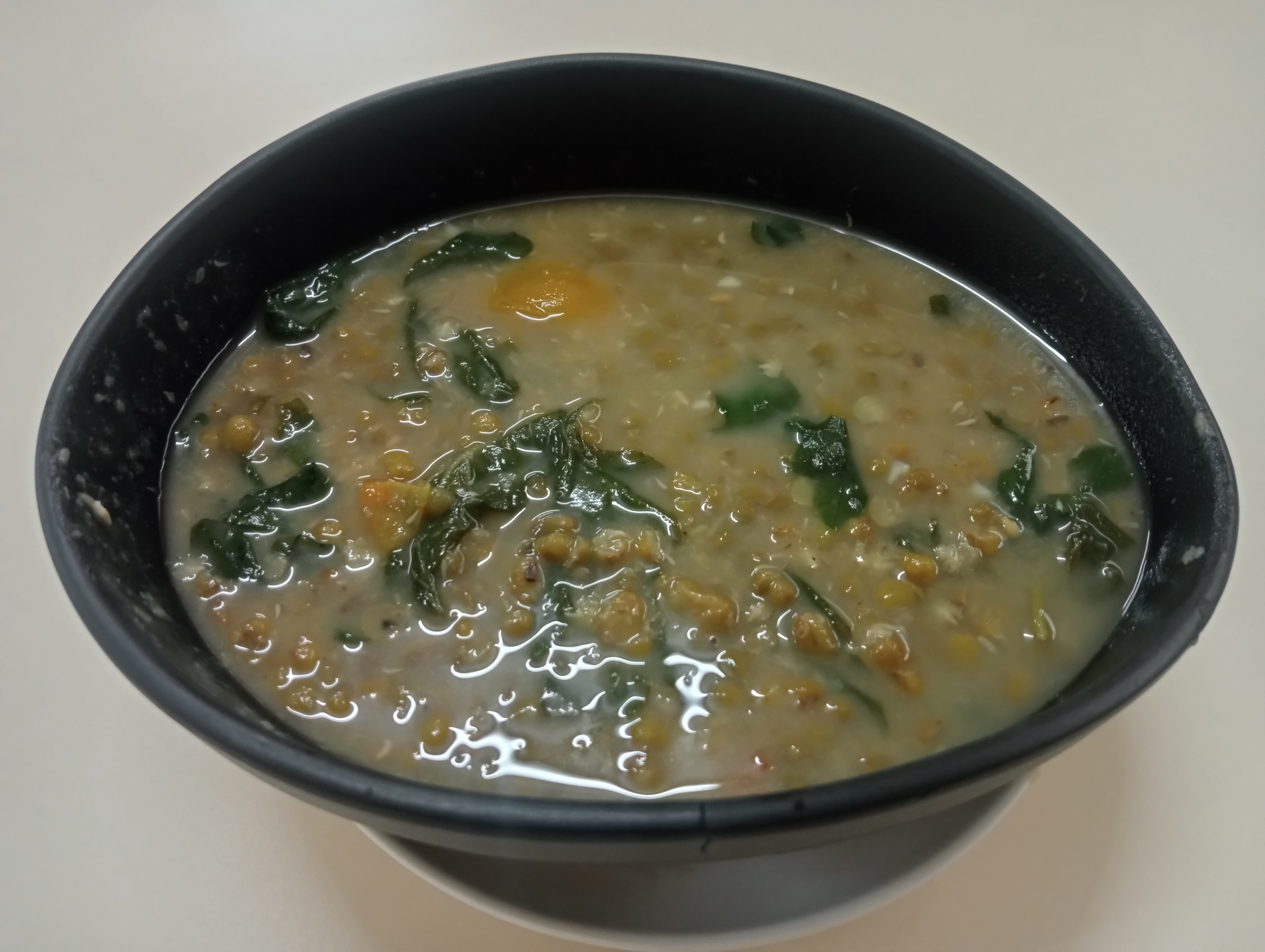
Ginisang munggo, a sautéed mung bean soup with leafy vegetables.

Legumes and beans are commonly stewed, forming the basis of several popular dishes. Ginisang munggo is a mung bean stew typically sautéed or simmered with tomatoes, onions, garlic, patis, and leafy vegetables such as moringa, bitter melon, and chili leaves, often garnished with tinapa or chicharon. Habichuelas, made from white beans, are slowly cooked with tomatoes, pork knuckles, and Chorizo de Bilbao. The Ilocano version, often called pusi, bitsuelas, or pinablad, is seasoned with bagoong isda and includes bitter melon leaves.

In the Cordillera Region, black beans are cooked with preserved meats such as etag or kiniing, seasoned with salt, and often combined with highland vegetables like cabbage and wombok. In Western Visayas, KBL (kadyos, baboy, kag langka) consists of stewed pork with pigeon peas (kadyos) and jackfruit (langka), soured with batuan and enriched with leafy vegetables. In Mindanao, papis is a bean stew prepared with canned pork or slow-cooked beef with tendons, flavored with local spices.

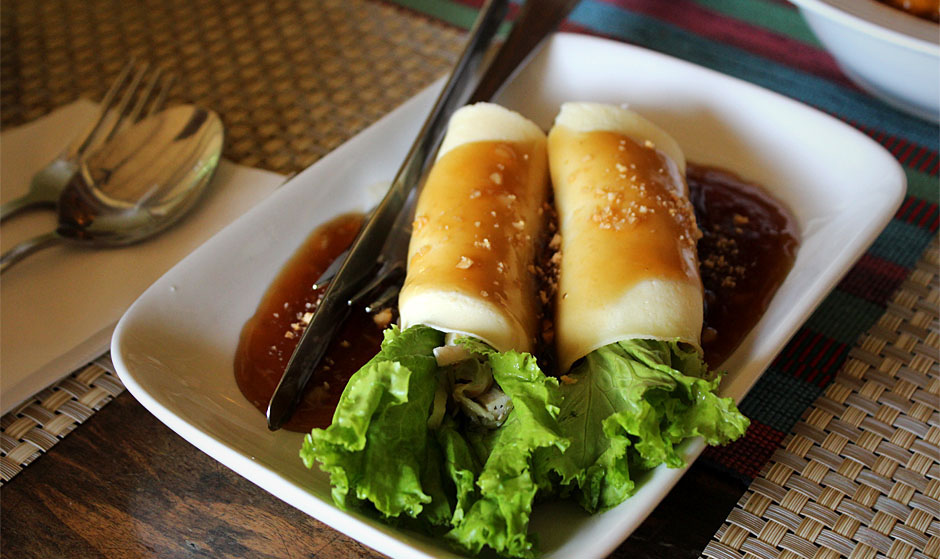
Lumpiang ubod a fresh spring roll with heart of palm, vegetables, and wrapped in a soft crepe.

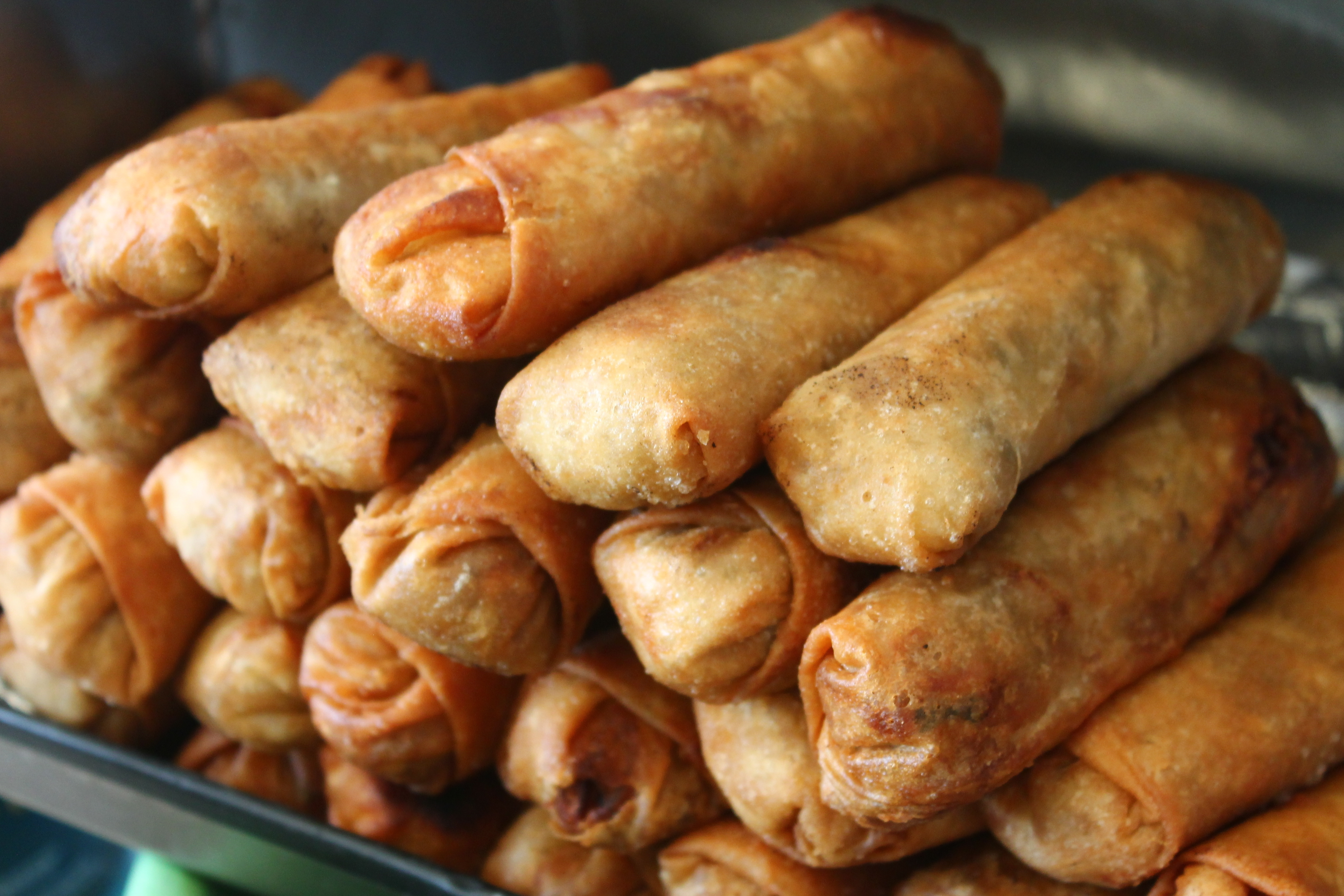
Lumpiang toge, a spring roll made from mung bean sprouts.

Lumpia-based dishes include a variety of vegetable-filled spring rolls that may be served fresh or fried. Lumpiang gulay refers to deep-fried spring rolls composed of mixed vegetables such as cabbage, carrots, sweet potato, and green beans (Baguio beans or sitaw). Variants include lumpiang toge (bean sprouts), lumpiang labong (bamboo shoots), and lumpiang singkamas (jicama). Dynamite is a modern variation consisting of green chili peppers stuffed with cheese or giniling, wrapped and deep-fried. Lumpiang sariwa (“fresh lumpia”) is made with a soft egg or flour crêpe filled with vegetables such as sweet potato, cabbage or lettuce, tofu, and jicama, and is typically served with a sweet garlic sauce and crushed peanuts; a related version, lumpiang hubad, is served without the wrapper. In Silay City, Negros Occidental, lumpiang ubod features heart of palm (ubod) as the primary filling.

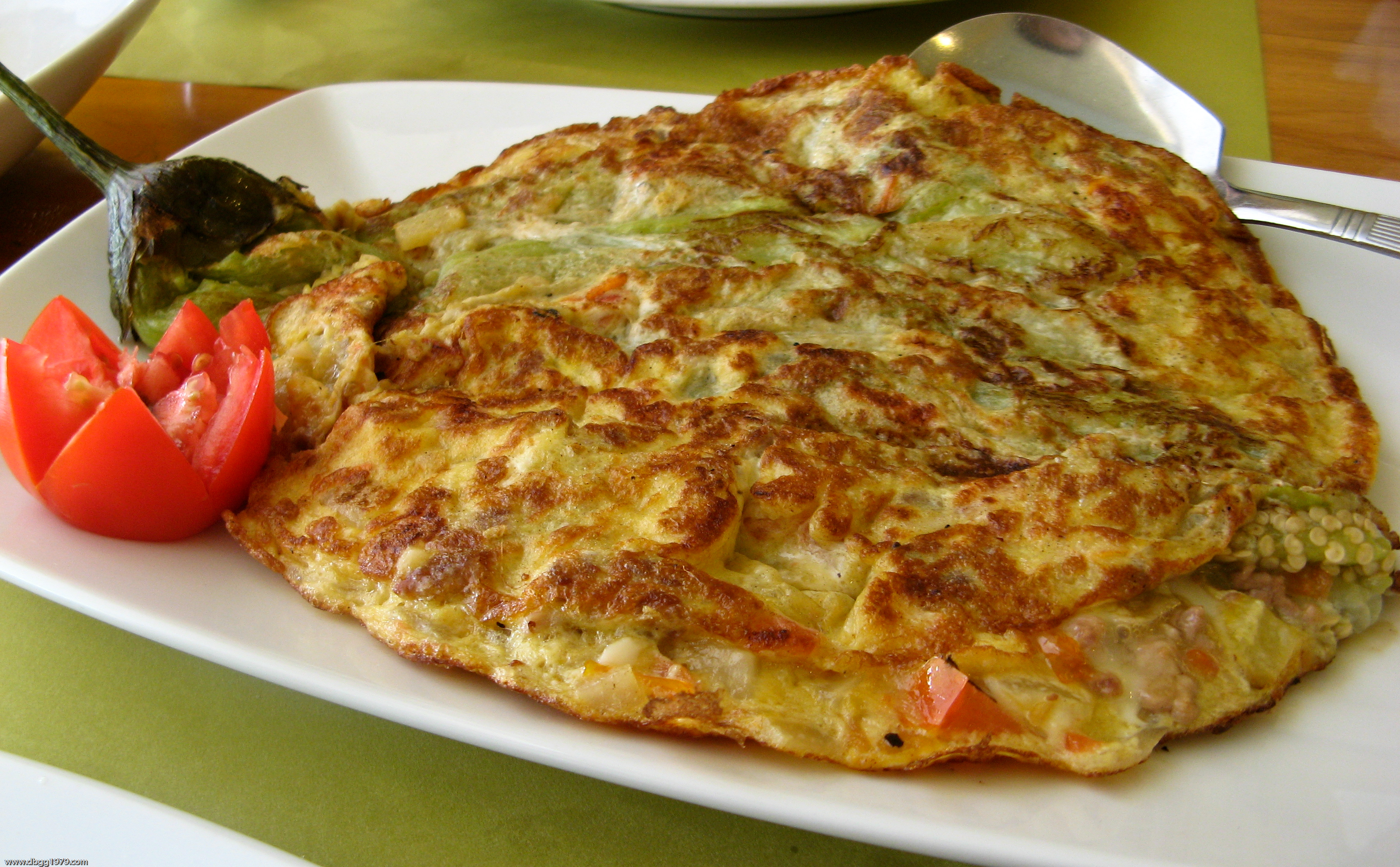
Tortang talong, a grilled eggplant omelette.

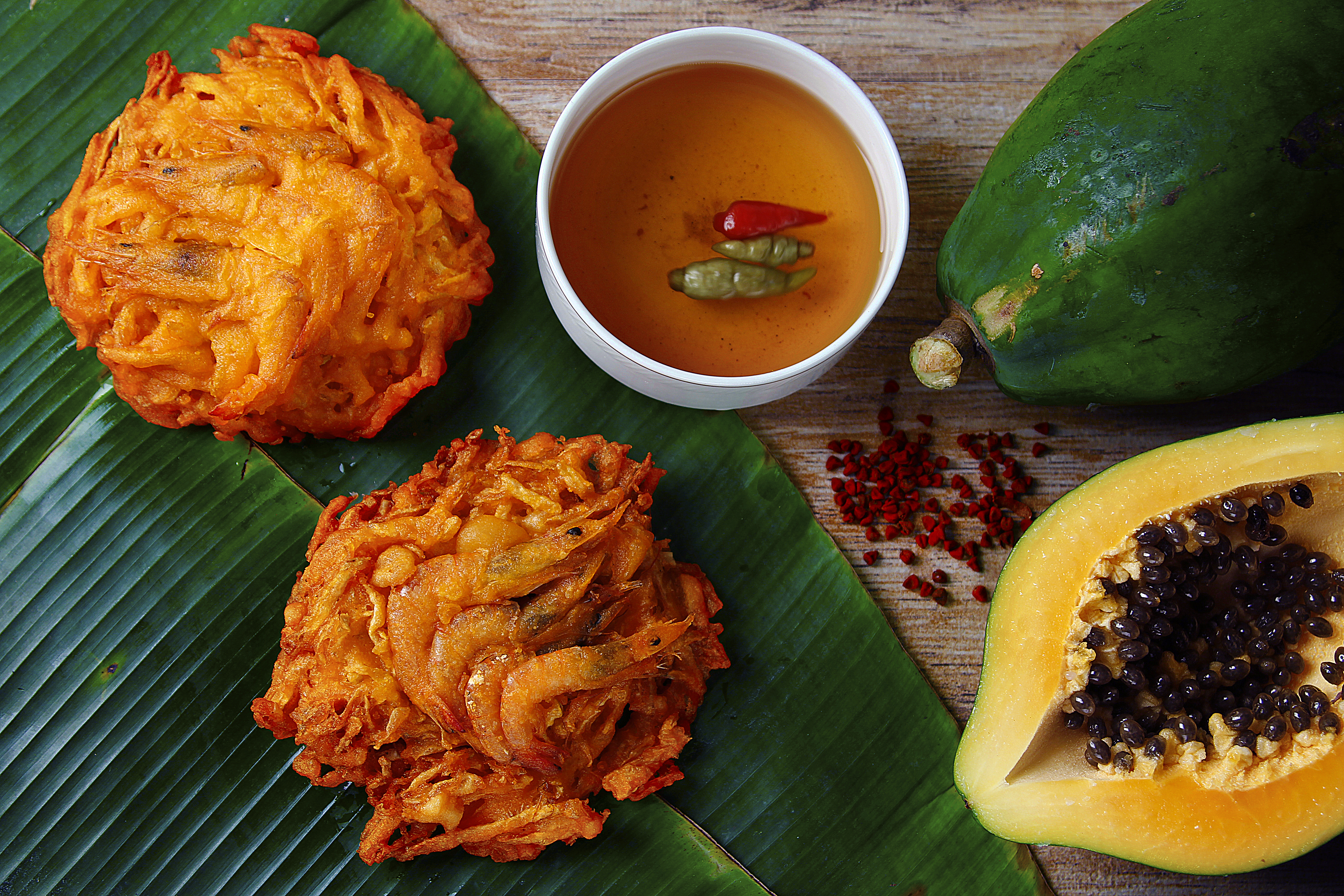
Okoy, a crispy fritter made with calabasa, sweet potatoes, and mixed with shrimp.

Torta refers to omelette-style dishes that often incorporate vegetables. Tortang talong is a grilled eggplant omelette typically combined with eggs and sometimes mixed with tomatoes, onions, or giniling. A related dish, poqui-poqui, consists of grilled eggplant that is sautéed and scrambled with eggs. Other sautéed vegetable-and-egg dishes include ginisang ampalaya (bitter melon with egg), ginisang kamatis at itlog (tomatoes with egg), and siarsiado, as well as Kapampangan variants such as kultyas, tuchas, or tutyas. Okoy is a crisp, deep-fried fritter made with a batter and various vegetables such as squash (kalabasa), sweet potato, bean sprouts, or cassava, often combined with small shrimp.

Atchara or burong gulay, a pickled vegetables that are widely served as side dishes. The most popular form is pickled green papaya, typically prepared with carrots, onions, ginger, and bell peppers, and preserved in a solution of vinegar and water with added spices; variations depend on the vegetables used. In the Ilocos Region, inartem or artem refers to a traditional pickling method that uses sukang Iloko (sugarcane vinegar) to preserve unripe fruits, vegetables, and spices, including balayang (wild banana), tamarind, radish, and santol.

== Desserts ==
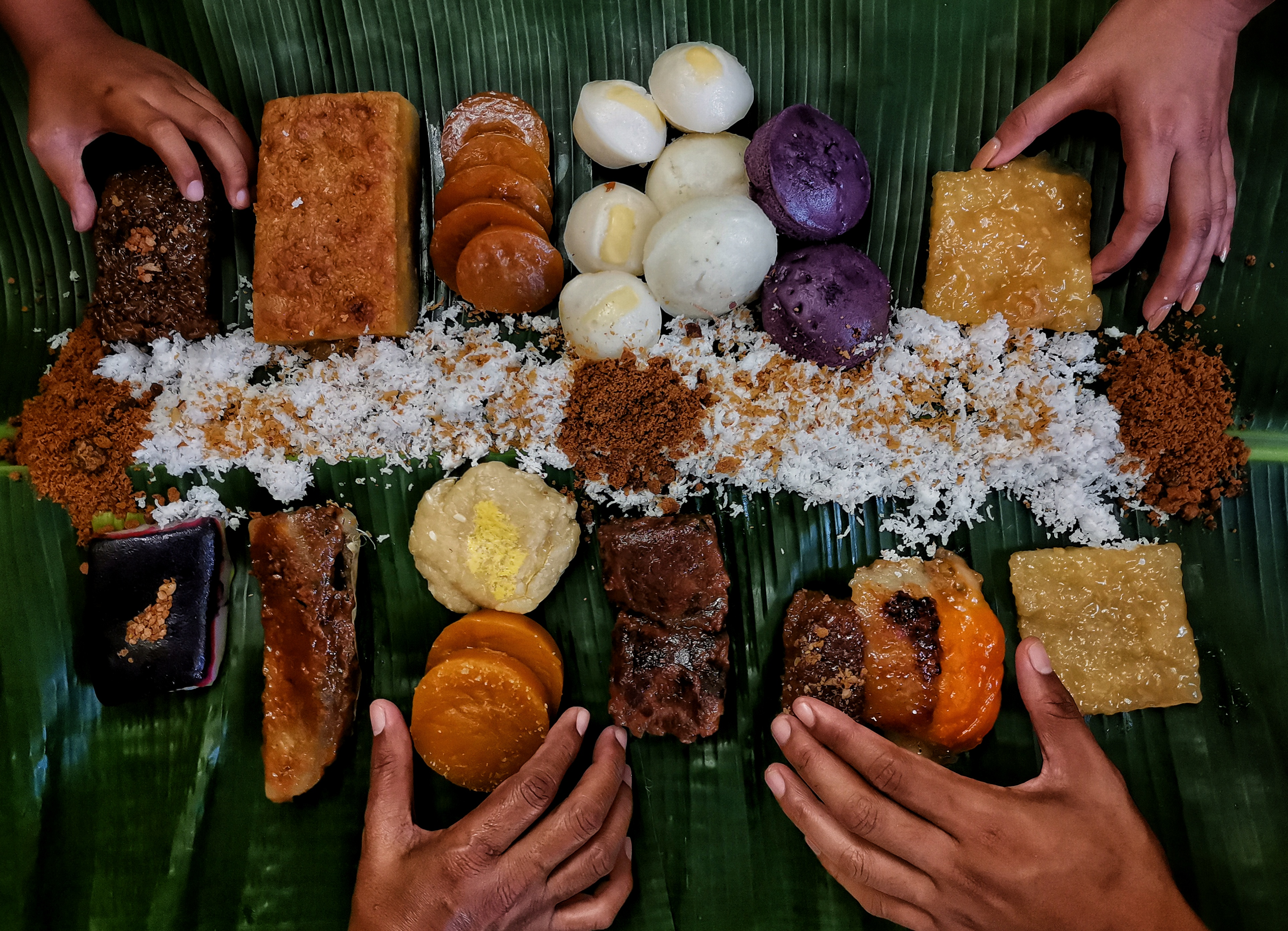
A variety of traditional Filipino rice cake (kakanin) desserts.

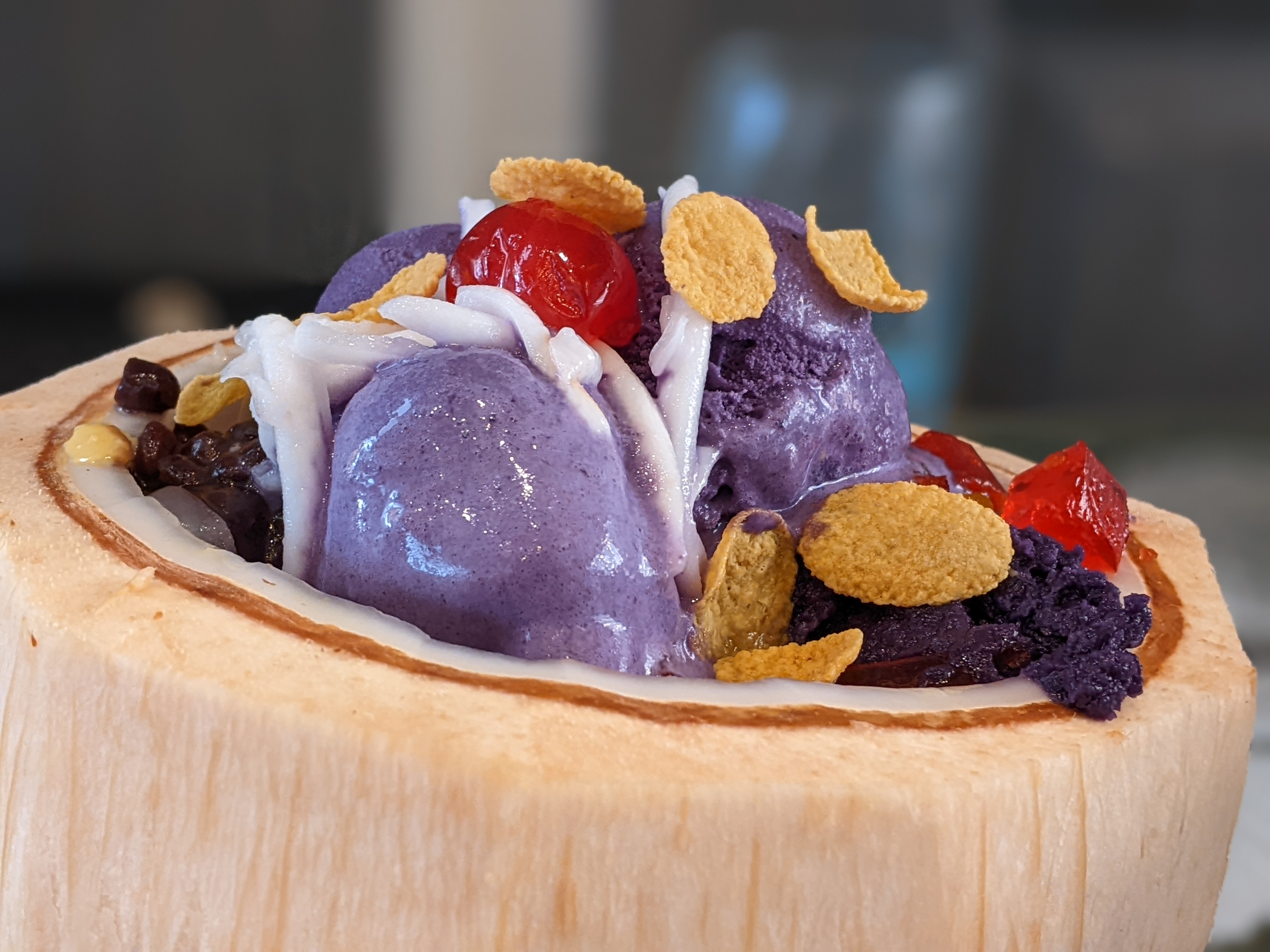
Halo-halo, a popular Filipino dessert made with mixed sweet ingredients, shaved ice, and milk.

As the Philippines is a tropical country, many desserts are made from rice and coconuts. One often seen dessert is bibingka, a hot rice cake optionally topped with a pat of butter, slices of kesong puti (white cheese), itlog na maalat (salted duck eggs), and sometimes grated coconut. There are also glutinous rice sweets called biko made with sugar, butter, and coconut milk.

In addition, there is a dessert known as bitsu-bitsu, also known as a Pinoy donut, made with fried rice flour which is then coated with muscovado sugar syrup. There is also karioka, made from glutinous rice flour, coconut, and coconut milk, fried and skewered and slathered with a brown sugar glaze. Another brown rice cake is kutsinta.

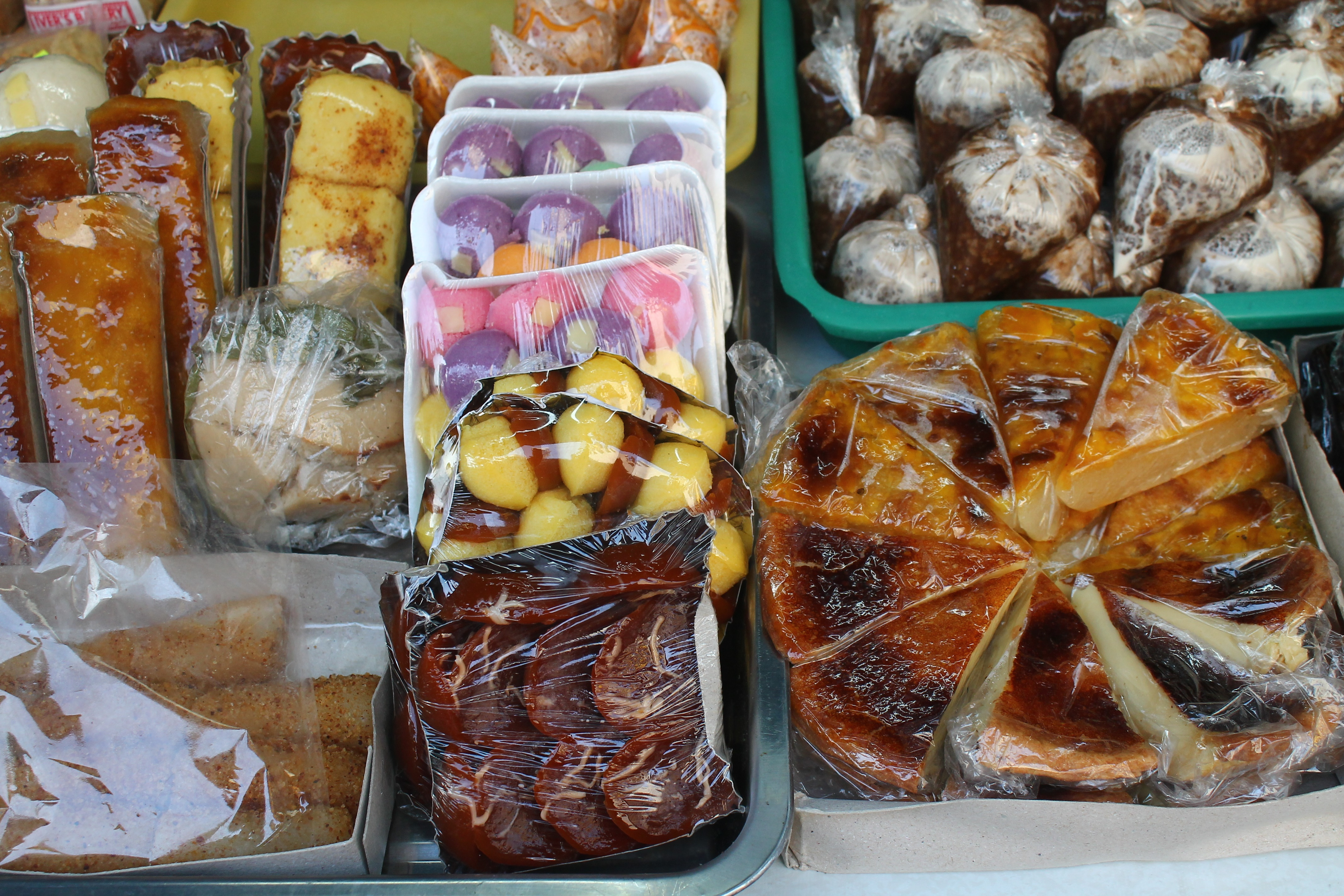
An array of traditional Filipino desserts, including cassava cake, puto, and tikoy.

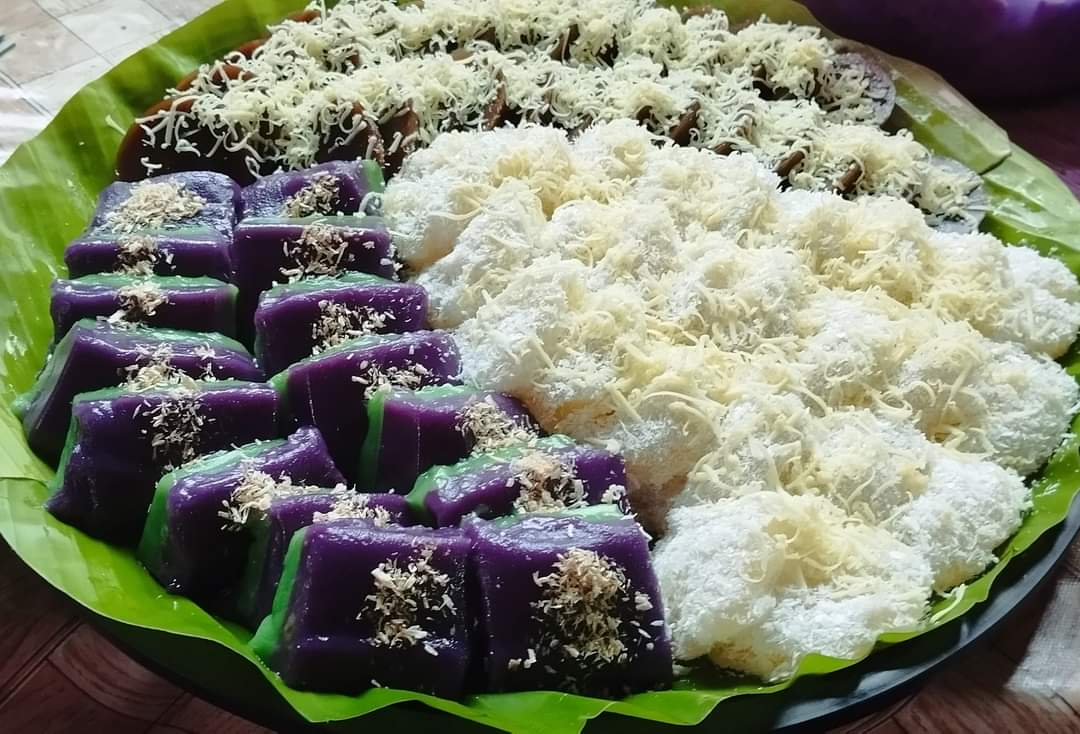
Rice cakes in a bilao, featuring sapin-sapin, palitaw, and kutsinta.

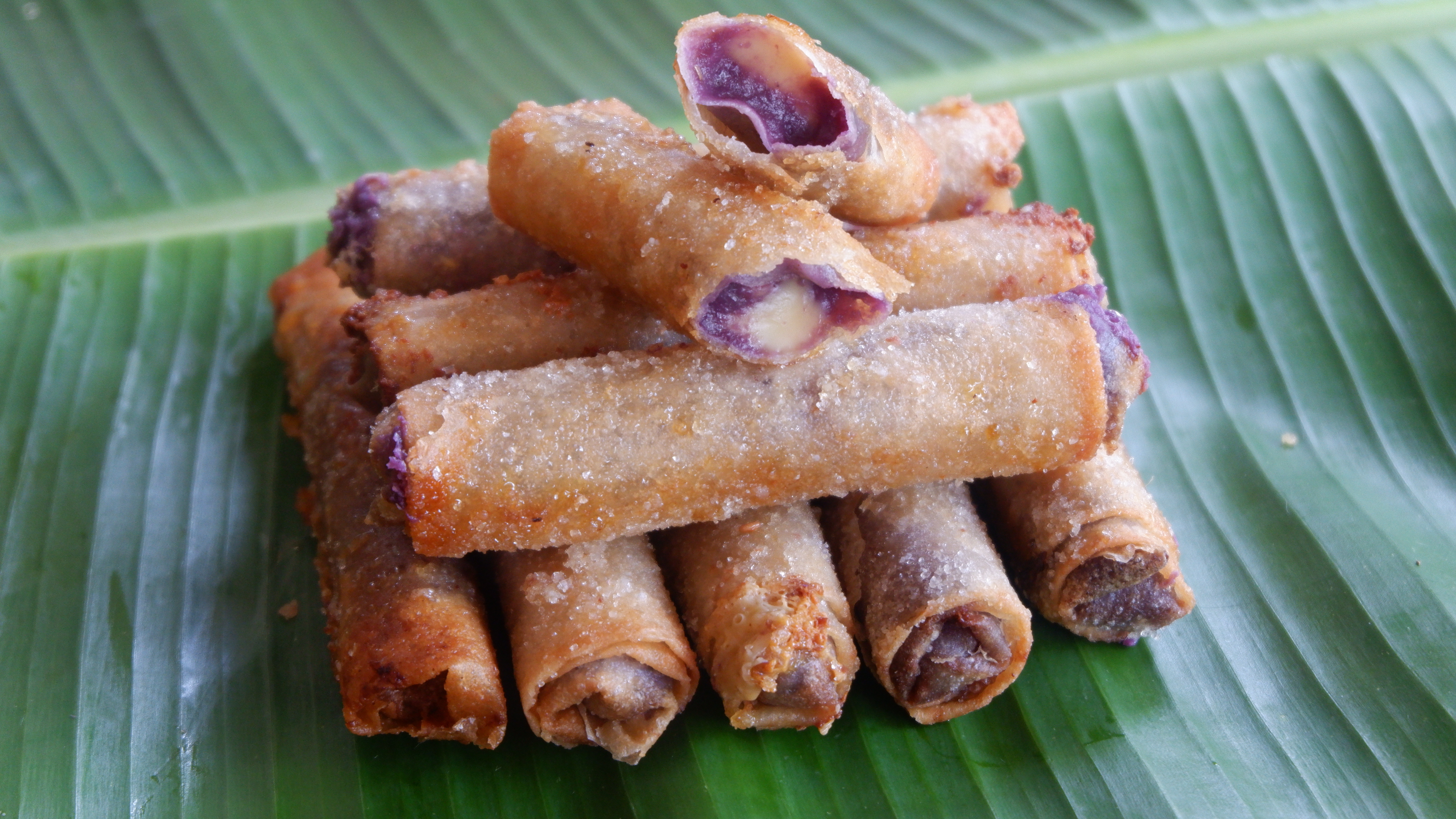
Ube Turon

Puto is another well-known example of sweet steamed rice cakes prepared in many different sizes and colors. Sapin-sapin (sapin means layer) are three-layered, tri-colored sweets made with rice flour, purple yam, and coconut milk characterized by its gelatinous appearance. Palitaw are rice patties that are covered with sesame seeds, sugar, and coconut; and pitsi-pitsi are cassava patties coated with cheese or coconut.

Tibok-tibok is based on carabao milk, being similar to maja blanca. As a snack, binatog is made with corn kernels with shredded coconut. Packaged snacks may be wrapped in banana or palm leaves then steamed. Suman is made from sticky rice and steamed. For chilled desserts there is halo-halo, a dessert made with shaved ice, milk, and sugar, with additional ingredients like coconut, ube halaya (mashed purple yam) or ube ice cream, leche flan, plantains, jackfruit, red beans, tapioca and pinipig.

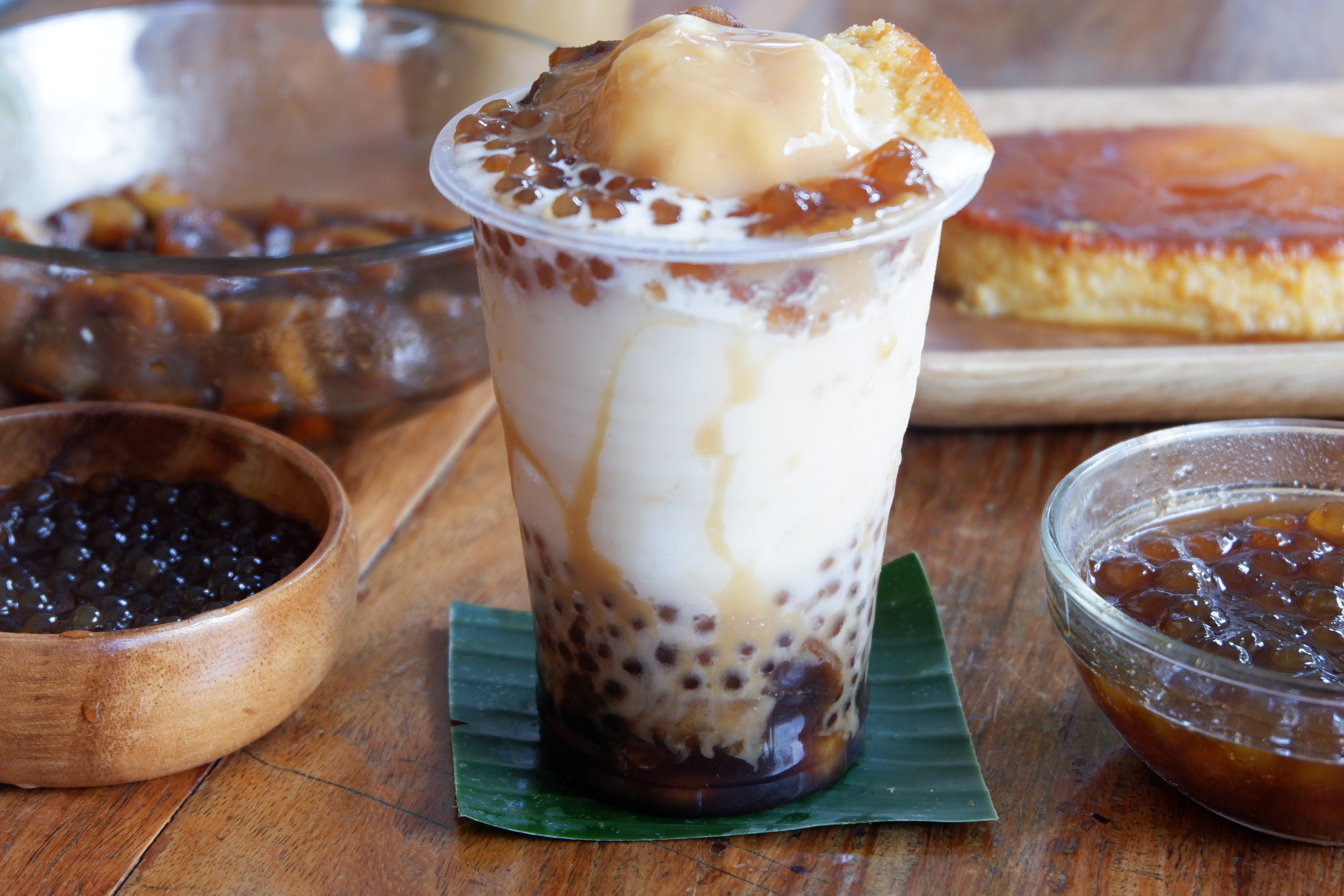
Saging con Yelo, a shaved ice dessert with sweetened bananas.

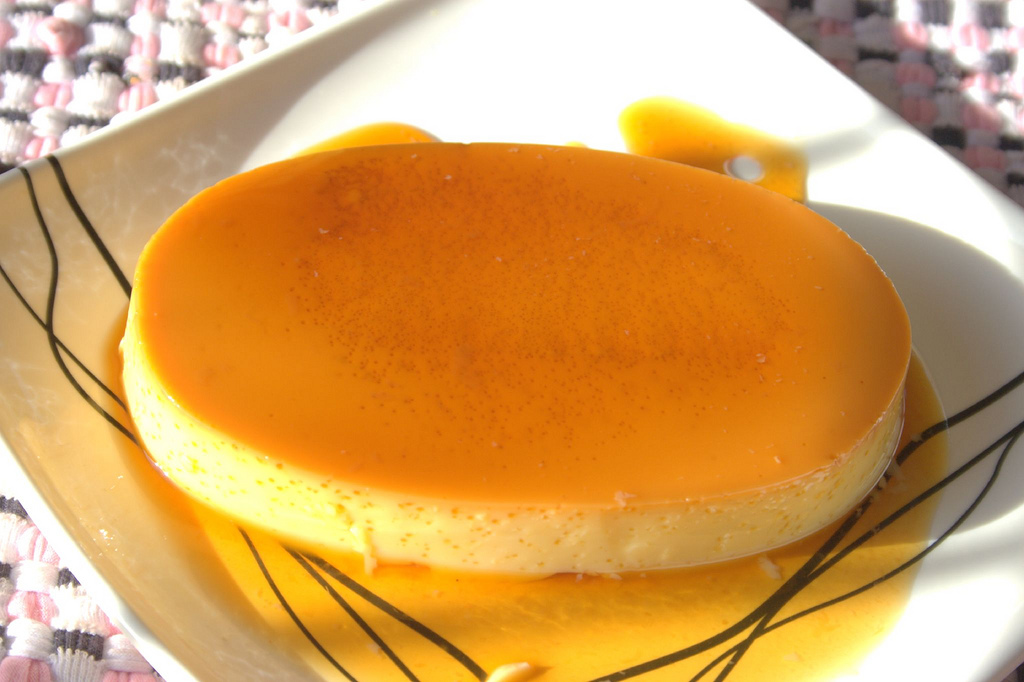
Leche flan, a custard dessert made with eggs, milk, and caramelized sugar.

Other similar treats made with shaved ice include saba con yelo which is shaved ice served with milk; minatamis na saging, ripe plantains chopped and caramelized with brown sugar; mais con yelo shaved ice served with steamed corn kernels, sugar, and milk; and buko pandan, sweetened grated strips of coconut with gulaman, milk, and the juice or extract from pandan leaves.

Sorbetes (ice cream) is popular, as well, with some local versions utilizing coconut milk instead of cow milk. Ice candy is a popular frozen snack usually made from fruit juice, chocolate or local ingredients such as mung beans and ube. It can be various flavors depending on the producer, chocolate and buko (coconut) flavored are two of the most popular.

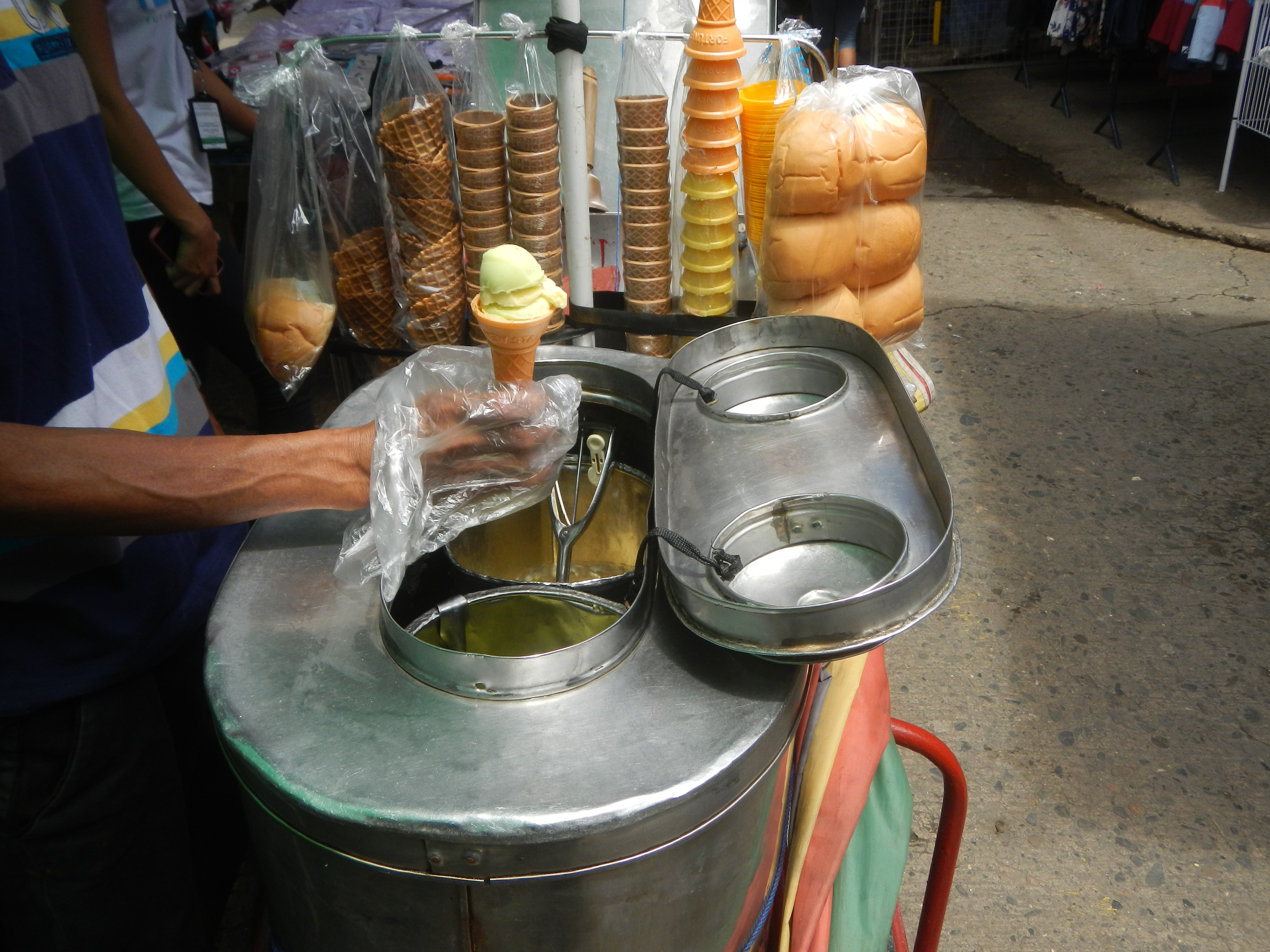
Sorbetes, traditional Filipino ice cream, often sold by street vendors.

Another dessert, often served during Christmas and New Year's Eve, is mango float, a dessert composed of graham crackers, mangoes, cream and milk, layered together in a dish and then refrigerated or blast chilled.

== Bread and pastries ==
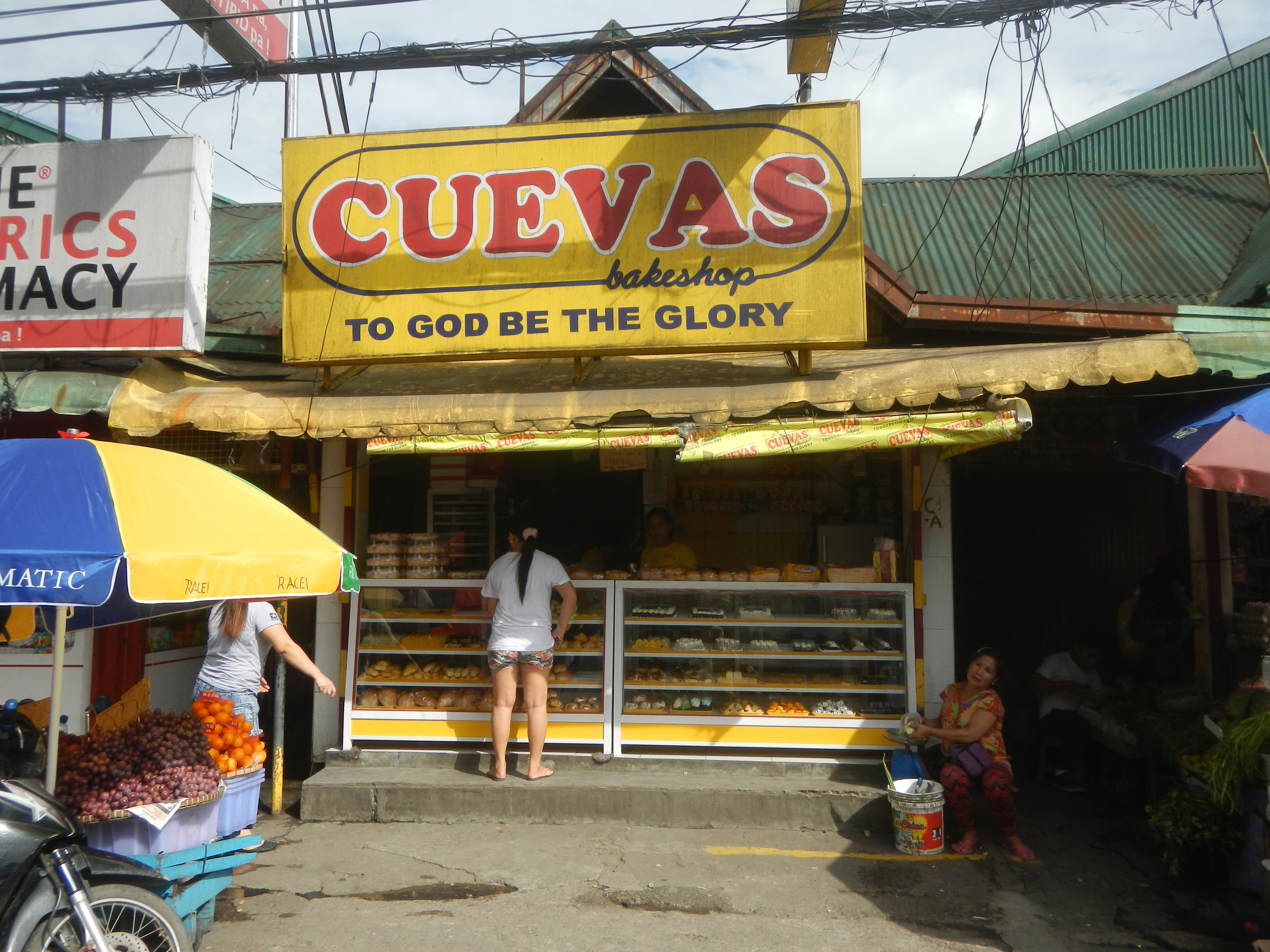
Panaderia, a traditional Filipino neighborhood bakery offering affordable, freshly baked bread and pastries.

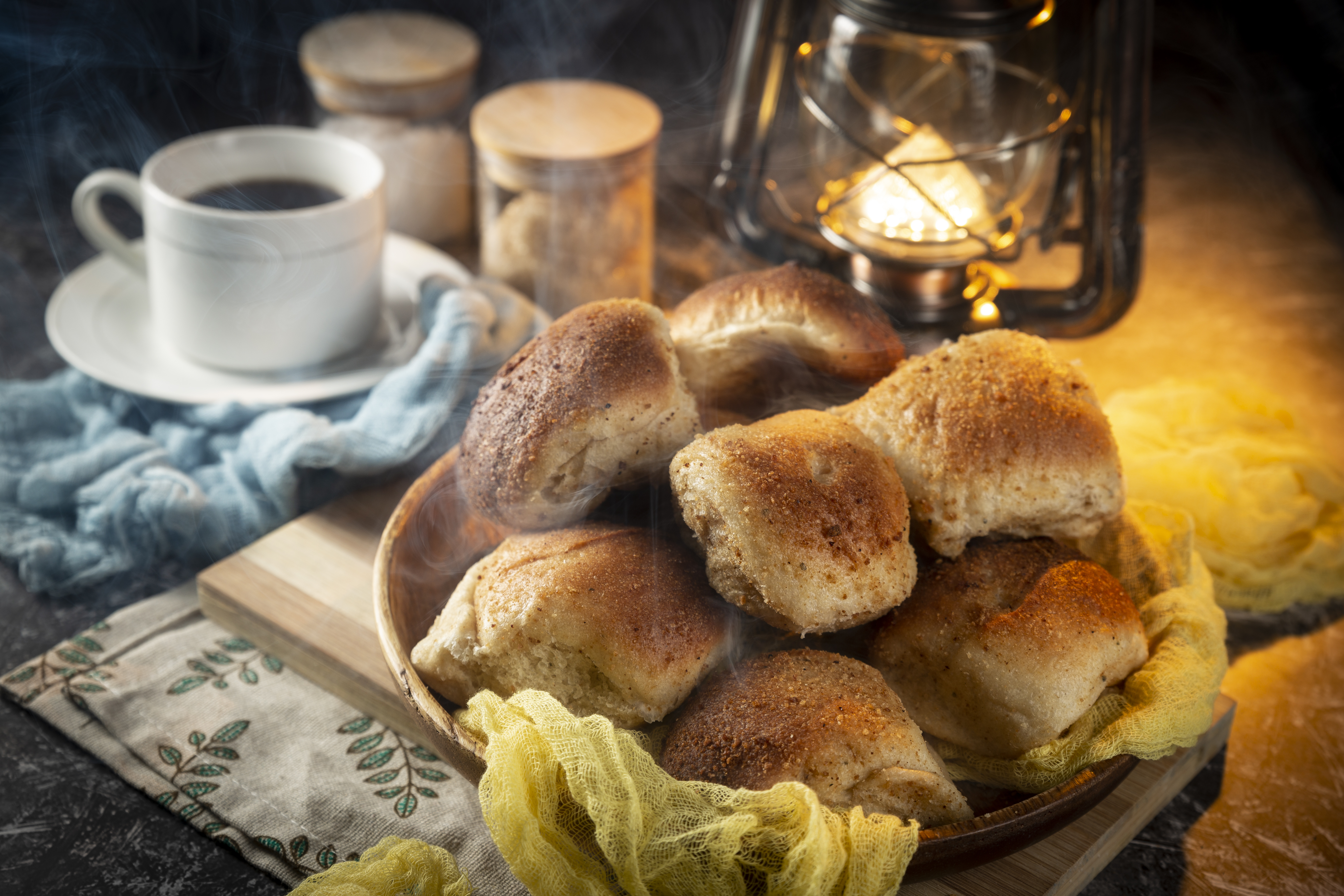
Pandesal, the most popular traditional Filipino bread.

In a typical Filipino bakery, pandesal, monay and ensaymada are often sold. Pandesal comes from the Spanish pan de sal (literally, bread of salt), and is a ubiquitous breakfast fare, normally eaten with (and sometimes even dipped in) coffee. It typically takes the form of a bread roll, and is usually baked covered in bread crumbs. Contrary to what its name implies, pandesal is not particularly salty as very little salt is used in baking it. Monay is a firmer slightly denser heavier bread. Ensaymada, from the Spanish ensaimada, is a pastry made using butter and often topped with sugar and shredded cheese that is especially popular during Christmas. It is sometimes made with fillings such as ube (purple yam) and macapuno (a variety of coconut, the meat of which is often cut into strings, sweetened, preserved, and served in desserts).

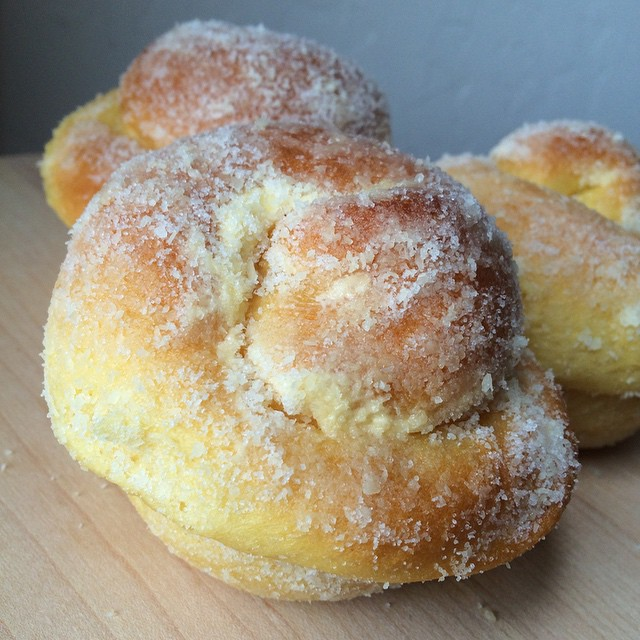
Ensaymada, with sugar-coated and cheese-filled.

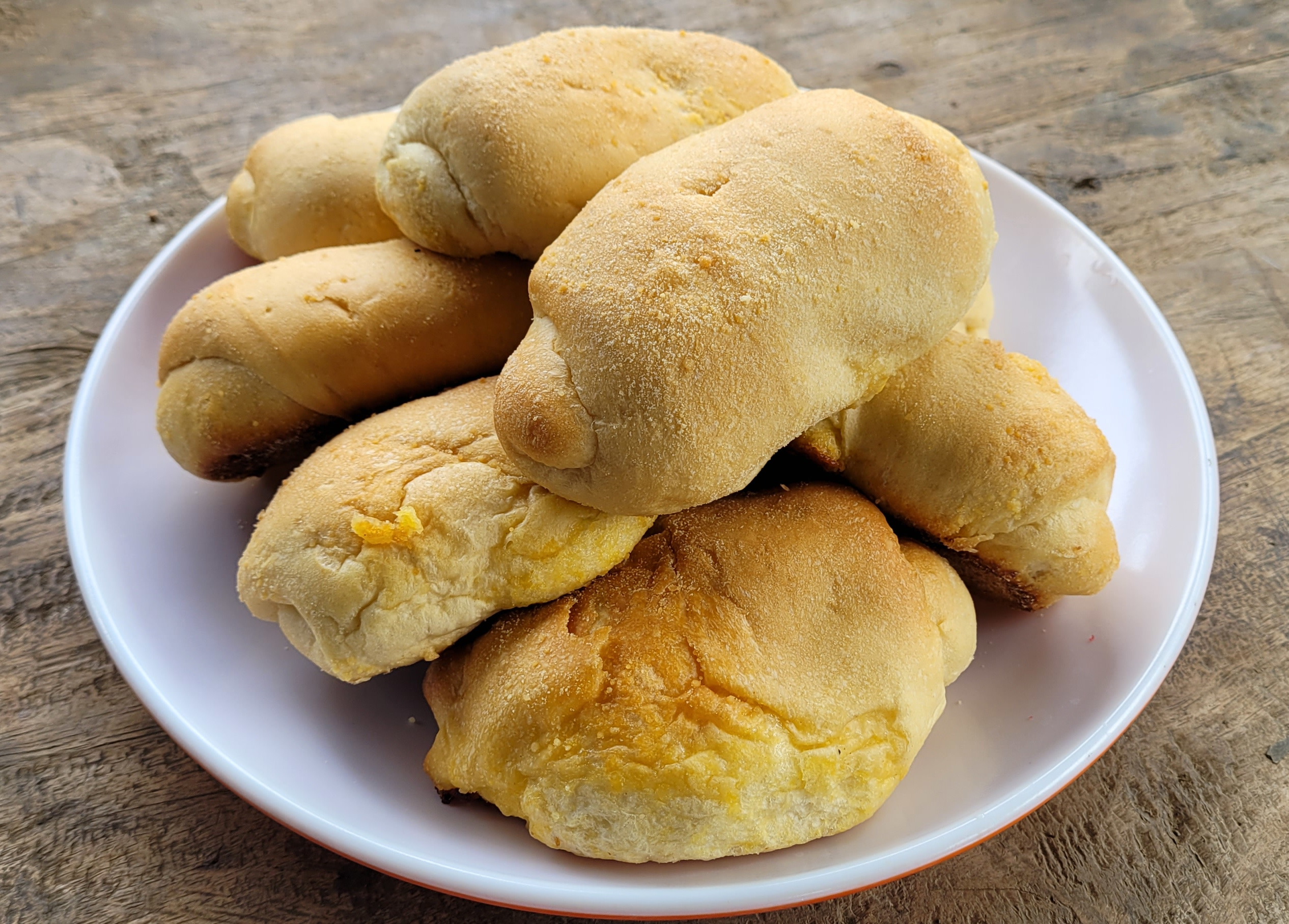
Spanish bread, a popular Filipino sweet bread roll often enjoyed as a merienda (snack).

Also commonly sold in Filipino bakeries is pan de coco, a sweet roll filled with shredded coconut mixed with molasses. Putok (also known in some localities as "star bread" or "pinagong"), which literally means "explode", refers to a small, hard bread roll whose cratered surface is glazed with sugar. Kababayan (Filipino muffins) is a small, sweet gong-shaped muffin that has a moist consistency. Spanish bread (nothing to do with the Spanish bread of Spain – Pan de Horno) refers to a rolled pastry which looks like a croissant prior to being given a crescent shape, and has a filling consisting of sugar and butter.

There are also rolls like pianono, which is a chiffon roll flavored with different fillings. Brazo de mercedes, a rolled cake or jelly roll, is made from a sheet of meringue rolled around a custard filling. Similar to the previous dessert, it takes on a layered presentation instead of being rolled and typically features caramelized sugar and nuts for sans rival. Silvañas are large, oval-shaped, cookie-sized desserts, with a thin meringue on either side of a buttercream filling and dusted with crumbed cookies. Not overly sweet, they are rich, crisp, chewy, and buttery all at the same time. Barquillos use sweet thin crunchy wafers rolled into tubes that can be sold hollow or filled with polvoron (sweetened and toasted flour mixed with ground nuts).

Meringues are also present in the Philippines, due to the Spanish influence, but they are called merengue – with all the vowels pronounced. Leche flan is a type of caramel custard made with eggs and milk similar to the French creme caramel. Leche flan (the local term for the original Spanish flan de leche, literally "milk flan") is a heavier version of the Spanish flan made with condensed milk and more egg yolks. Leche flan is usually steamed over an open flame or stove top, although on rare occasions it can also be seen baked. Leche flan is a staple in celebratory feasts. A heavier version of leche flan, tocino del cielo, is similar, but has significantly more egg yolks and sugar.

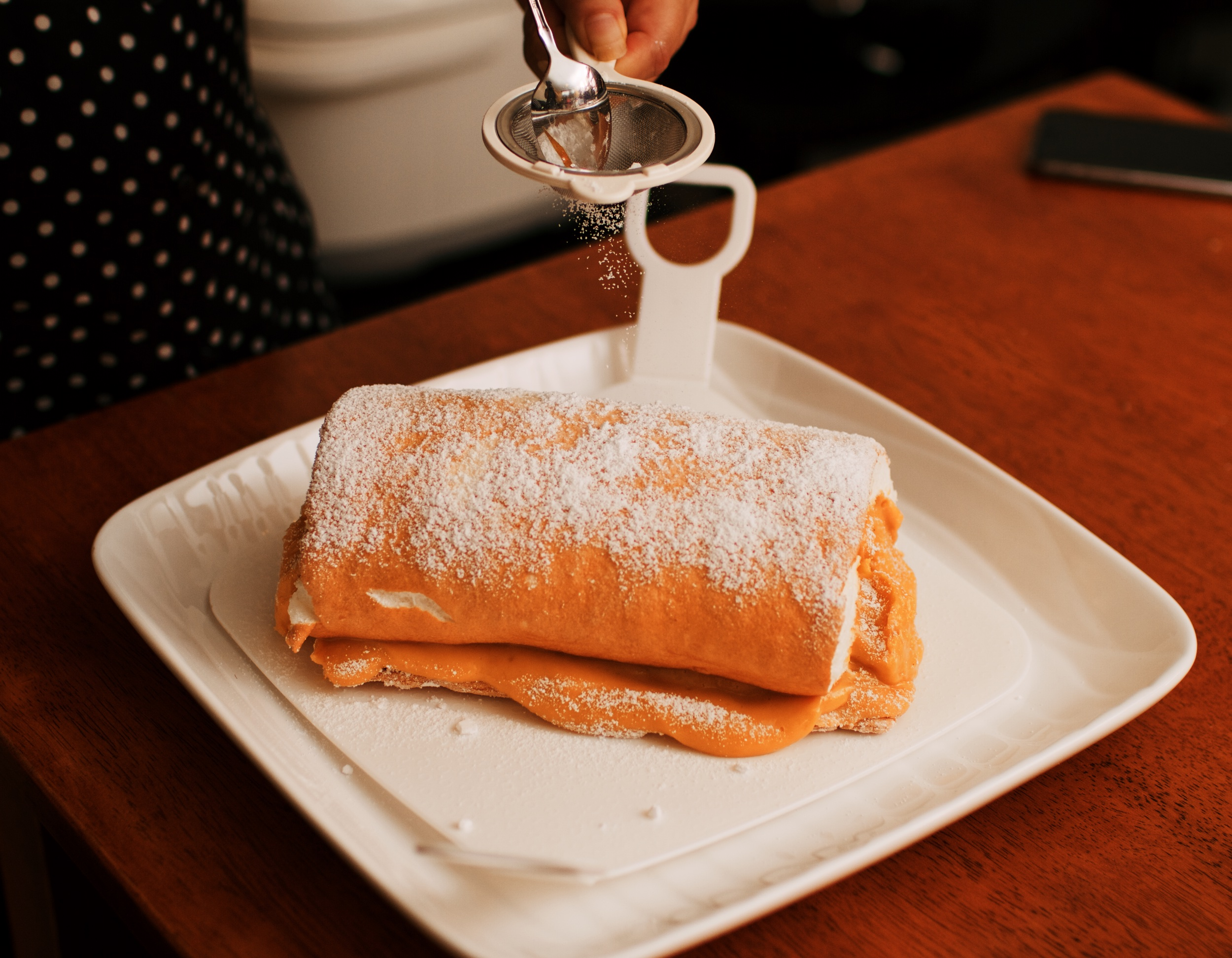
Brazo de Mercedes, a traditional Filipino meringue roll filled with custard and dusted with powdered sugar.

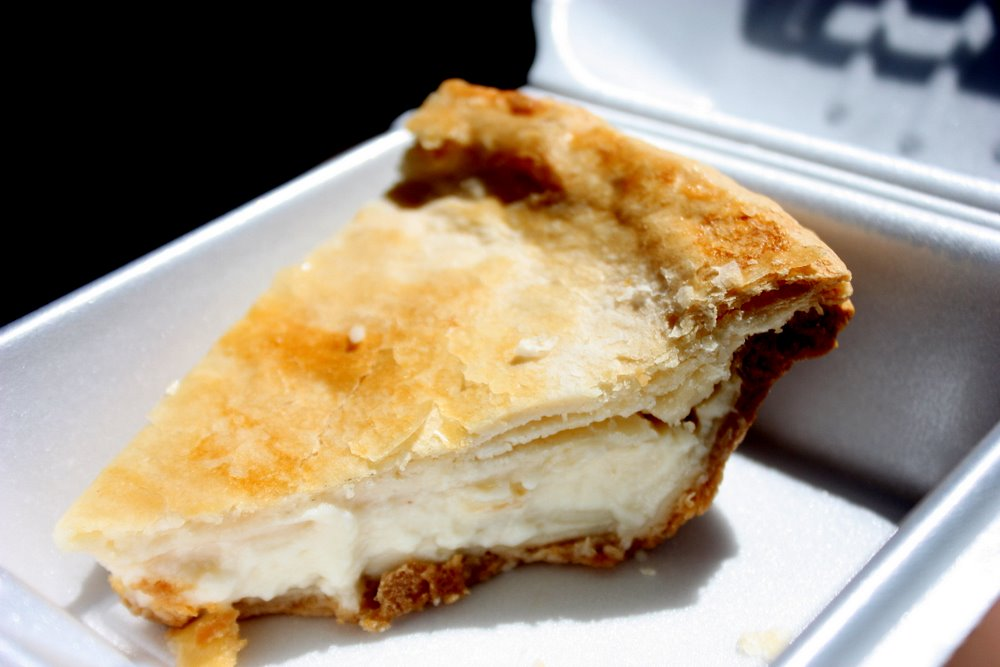
Buko pie, a traditional Filipino pie made with young coconut (malauhog).

The egg pie with a very rich egg custard filling is a mainstay in local bakeries. It is typically baked so that the exposed custard on top is browned. Buko pie is made with a filling made from young coconut meat and dairy. Mini pastries like turrones de casuy are made up of cashew marzipan wrapped with a wafer made to resemble a candy wrapper but take on a miniature look of a pie in a size of about a quarter. There is also napoleones – again with all the vowels pronounced – a mille-feuille pastry stuffed with a sweet milk-based filling.

There are hard pastries like biskotso a crunchy, sweet, twice-baked bread. Another baked goody is sinipit which is a sweet pastry covered in a crunchy sugar glaze, made to resemble a length of rope. Similar to sinipit is a snack eaten on roadsides colloquially called shingaling. It is hollow but crunchy with a salty flavor.

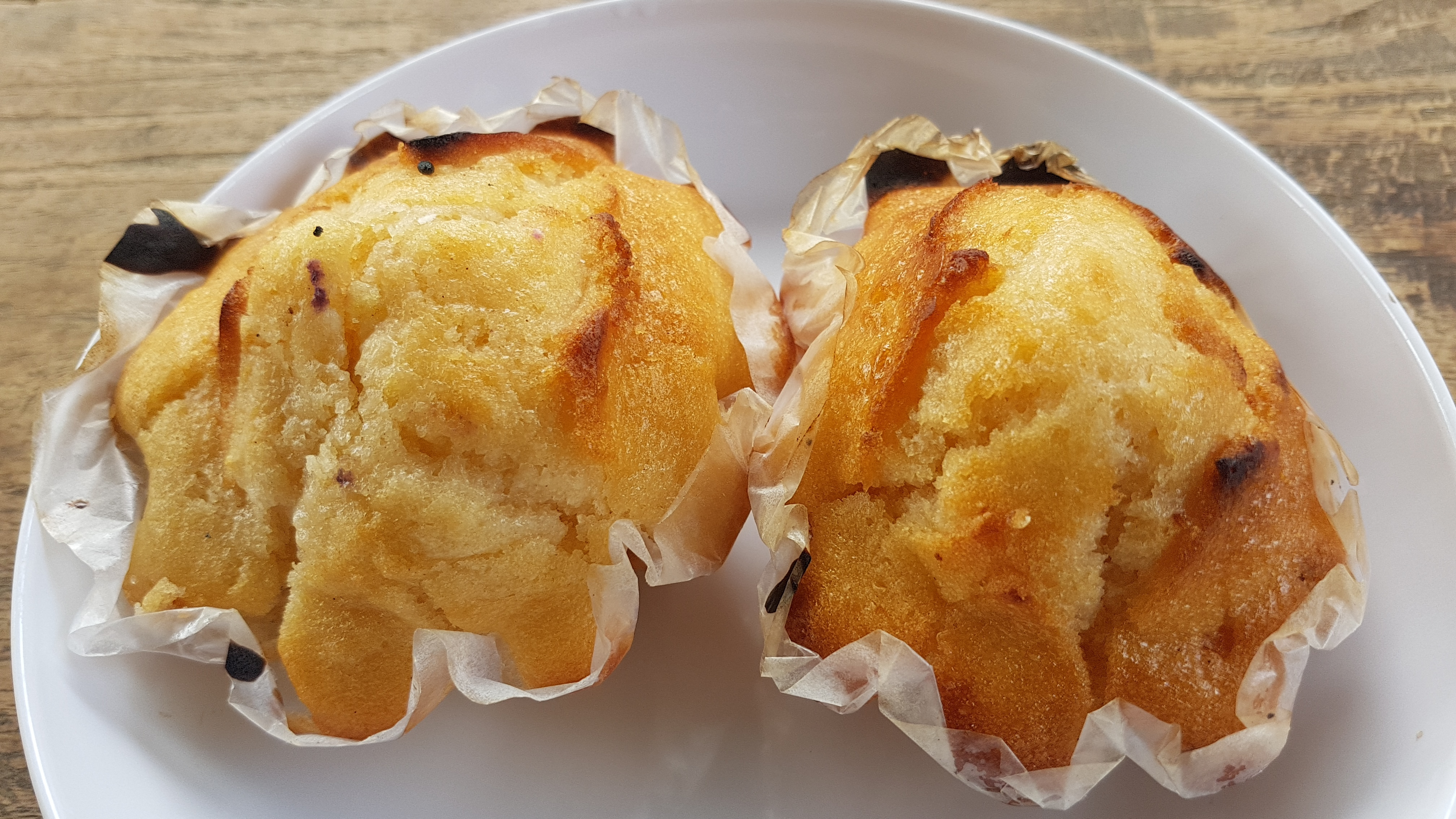
Mamon, a light, airy Filipino sponge cake.

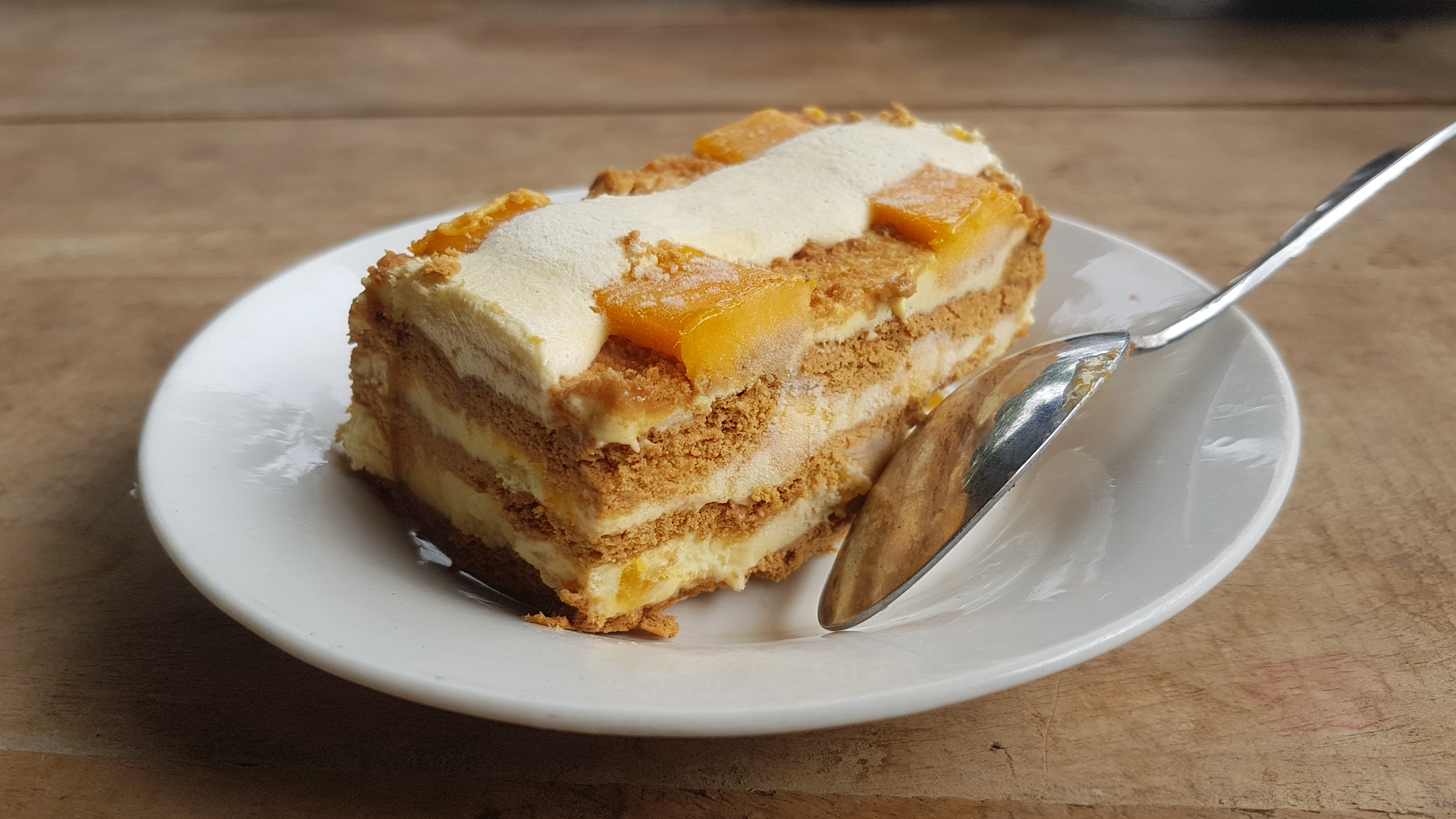
Mango float, an icebox cake version of crema de fruta made with cream, Graham crackers, condensed milk, and ripe mangoes.

For a softer treat there is mamon a chiffon-type cake sprinkled with sugar, its name derived from a slang Spanish term for breast. There is also crema de fruta, which is an elaborate sponge cake topped in succeeding layers of cream, custard, candied fruit, and gelatin. Similar to a sponge cake is mamoncillo which generally refers to slices taken from a large mamon cake, but it is unrelated to the fruit of the same name. Sandwich pastries like inipit are made with two thin layers of chiffon sandwiching a filling of custard that is topped with butter and sugar. Another mamon variant is mamon tostada, basically mamoncillo toasted to a crunchy texture.

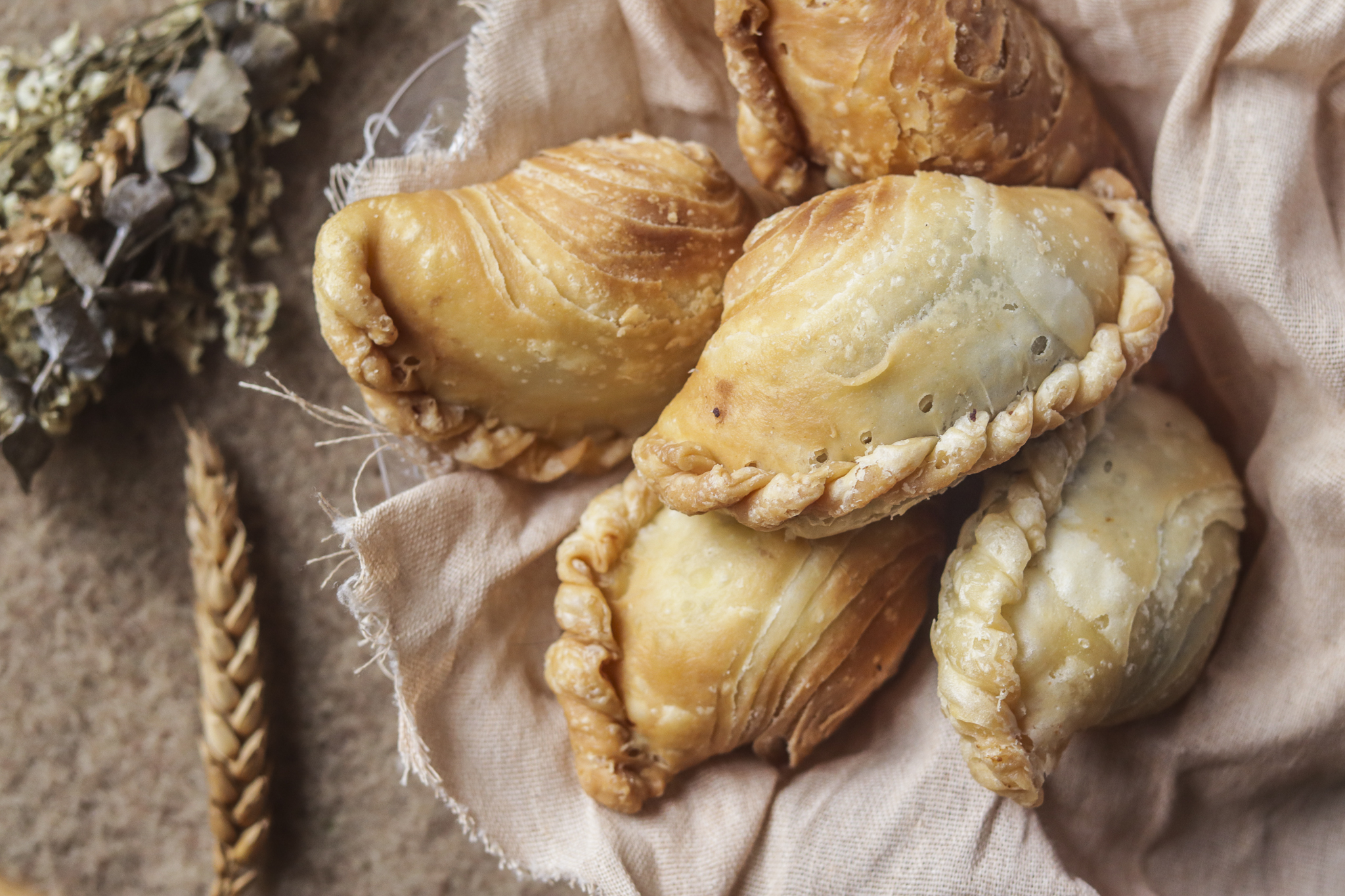
Empanada, a Filipino-style pastry typically filled with picadillo.

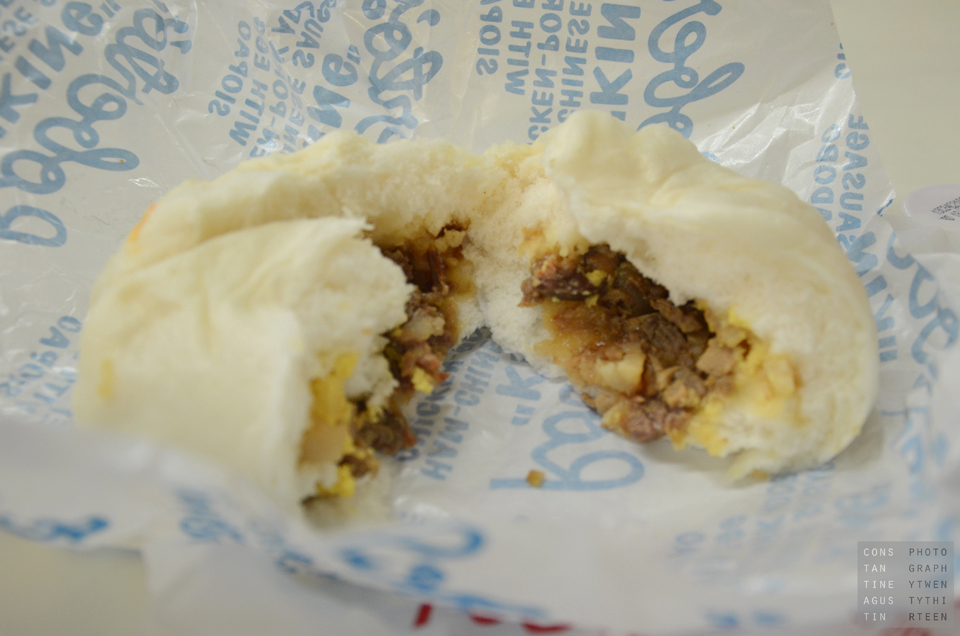
Siopao, a popular Filipino steamed bun typically filled with asado.

Stuffed pastries that reflect both Western and Eastern influence are common. One can find empanadas, a turnover-type pastry filled with a savory-sweet meat filling. Typically filled with ground meat and raisins, it can be deep fried or baked. Siopao is the local version of Chinese baozi. Buchi is another snack that is likely of Chinese origin. Bite-sized, buchi is made of deep-fried dough balls (often from rice flour) filled with a sweet mung bean paste, and coated on the outside with sesame seeds; some variants also have ube as the filling. There are also many varieties of the mooncake-like hopia, which come in different shapes (from a flat, circular stuffed form, to cubes), and have different textures (predominantly using flaky pastry, but sometimes like the ones in mooncakes) and fillings.

== Beverages ==
=== Chilled drinks and shakes ===
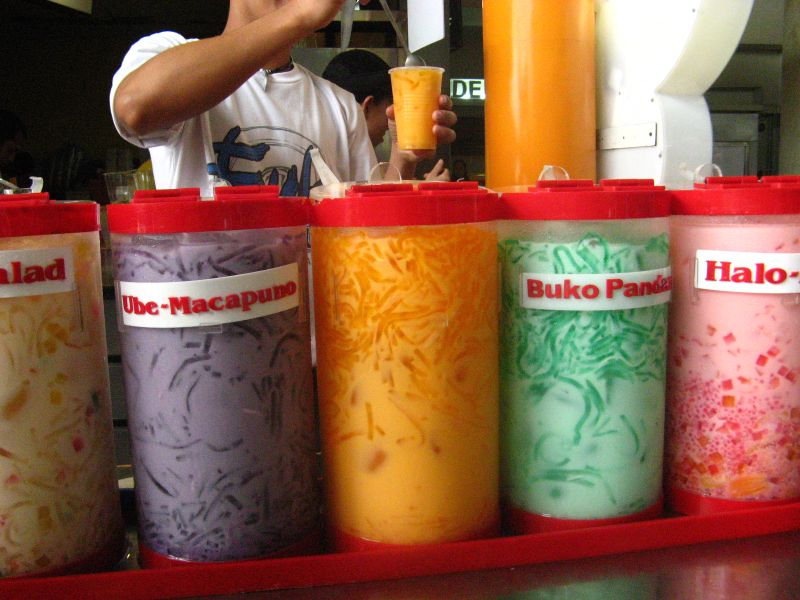
Samalamig, a variety of sweet, chilled Filipino drinks.

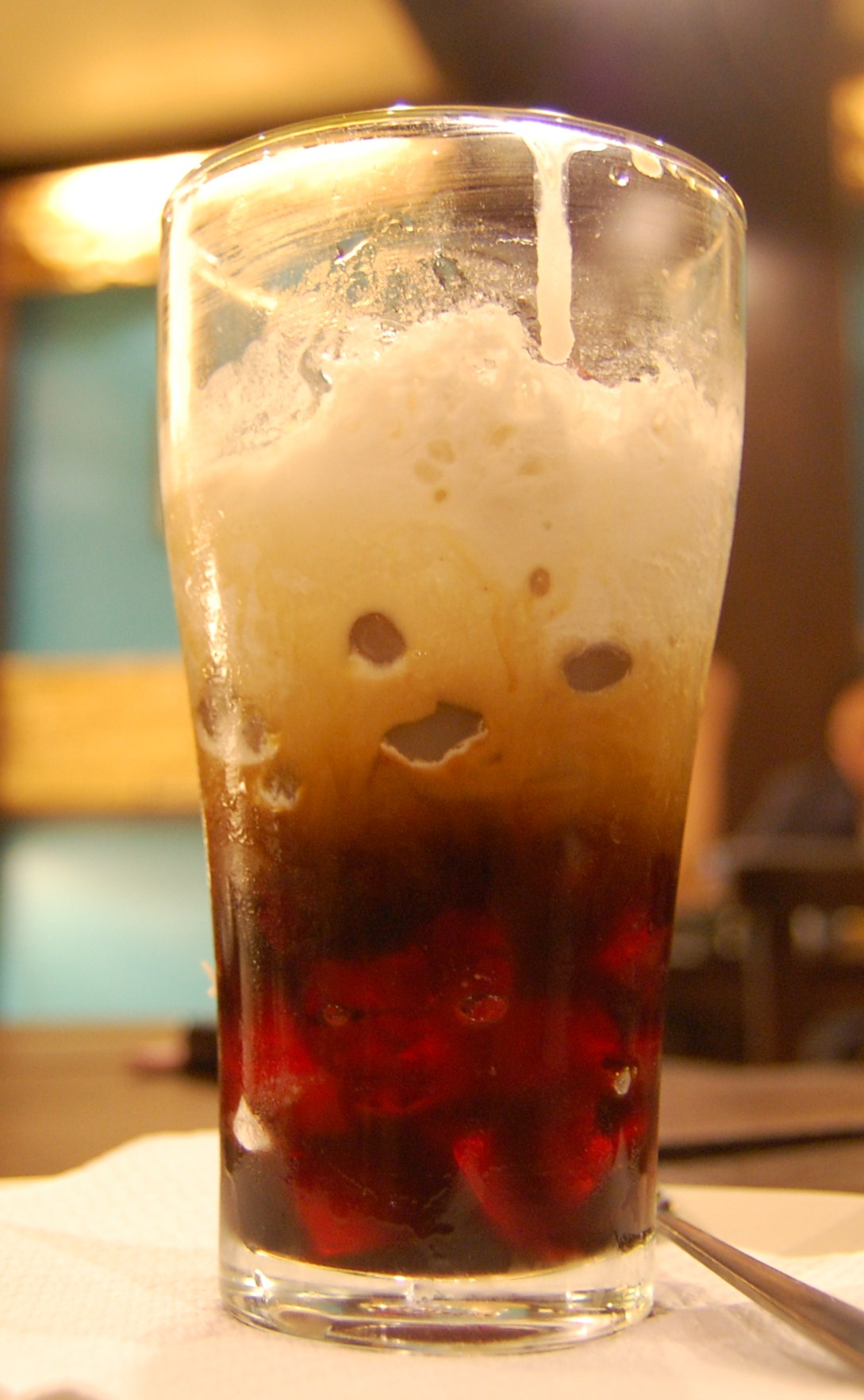
Sago't gulaman in Ilonggo style.

Chilled drinks are popular due to the tropical climate. Stands selling cold fruit drinks and fruit shakes are common in many of the city areas, where some are based on green mandarin orange (dalandan or dalanghita), pomelo (suha), pineapple (pinya), banana (saging), and soursop (guyabano). The shakes usually contain crushed ice, evaporated or condensed milk, and fruits like mango, avocado, cantaloupe, durian, papaya, strawberry and watermelon, to name a few.

Other chilled drinks include sago't gulaman, a flavored ice drink of pre-Hispanic Malay origin (Malay: gula melaka) with sago and agar gelatin with banana extract sometimes added to the accompanying syrup; fresh buko or coconut juice, the water or juice straight out of a young coconut via an inserted straw, a less fresh variation of which is from bottled coconut juice, scraped coconut flesh, sugar, and water; and kalamansi juice, the juice of kalamansi or Philippine limes usually sweetened with honey, syrup or sugar.

=== Brewed beverages ===
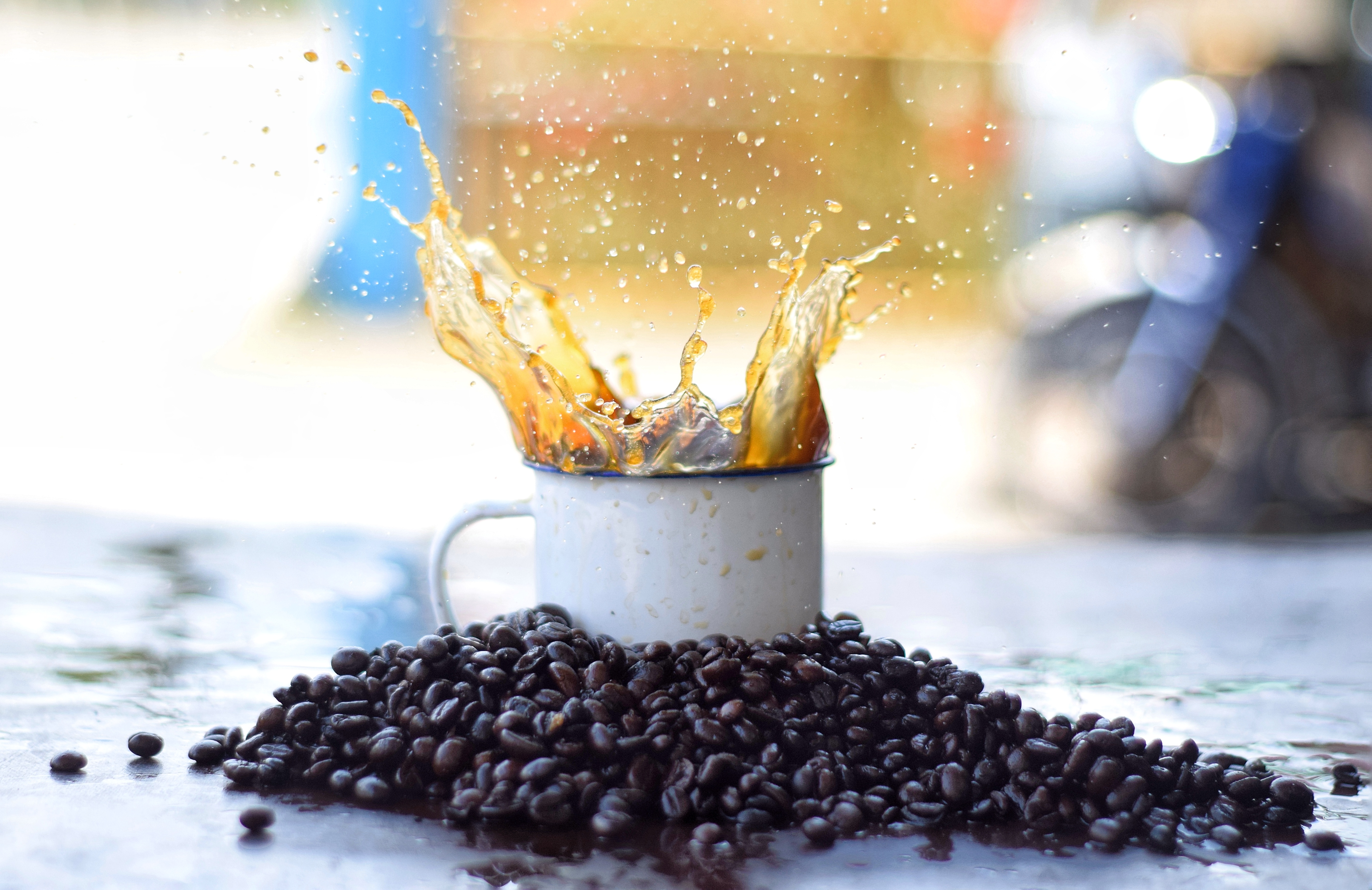
Kapeng Barako, a strong, bold coffee from Batangas.

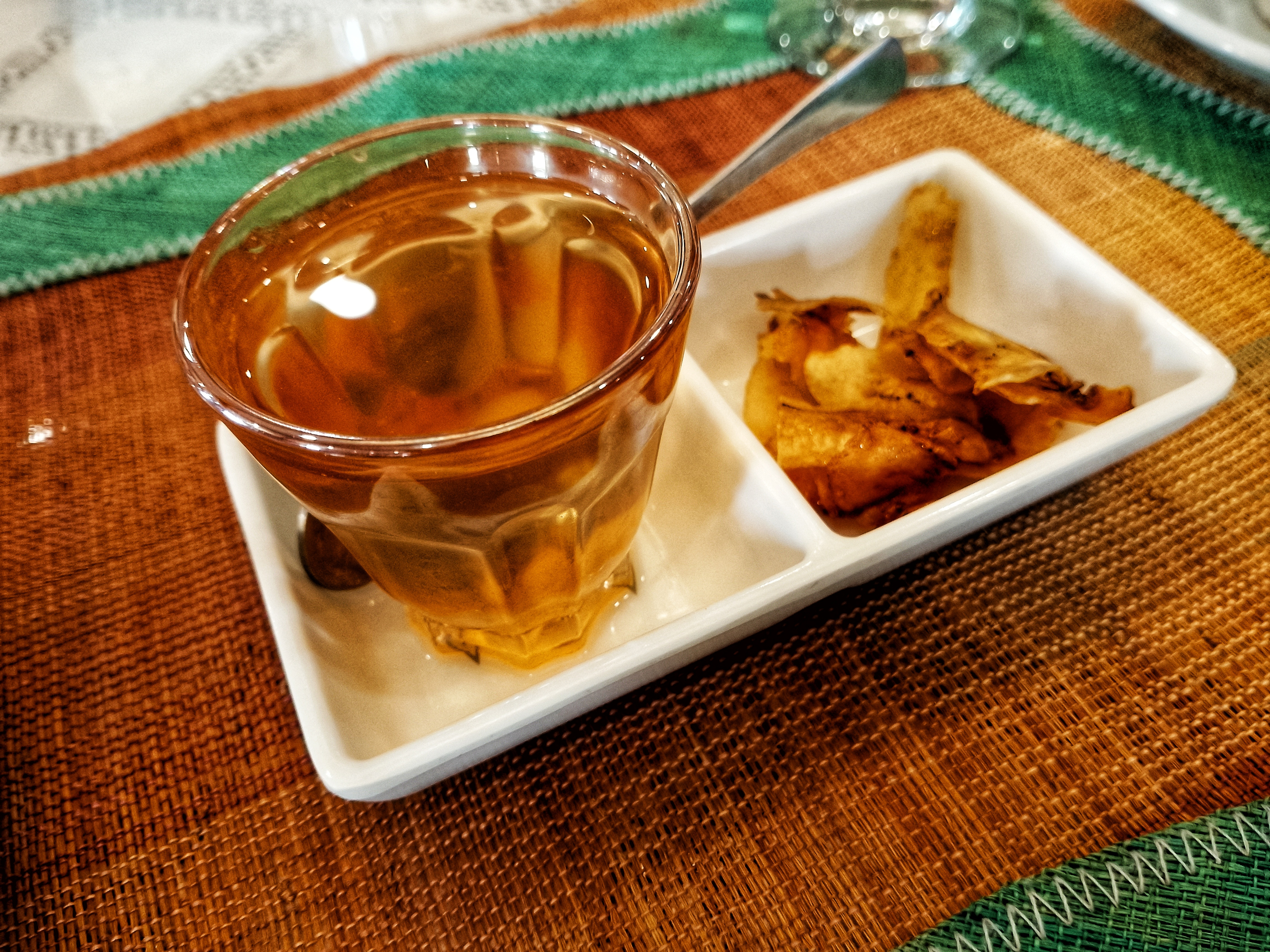
Salabat, a ginger tea.

The Philippines is a predominantly coffee-drinking nation. One of the most popular variants of coffee coming from the mountains of Batangas is known as kapeng barako. Another well-known variant of coffee is the civet coffee. It is called kape motit in the Cordilleras, kape alamid in Tagalog region, and kape musang in Mindanao. The Kalinga coffee known for its organic production is also rapidly gaining popularity. Highlands coffee, or Benguet coffee, is a blend of Robusta and Excelsa beans.

Even before the establishment of coffeehouses in the Philippines, coffee has been part of the Filipino meal. Carinderias would often serve them along with meals. The opening of Starbucks in 1997 paved the way for other coffee shops.

Tea consumption in the Philippines is driven primarily by growing health consciousness amongst middle- to high-income consumers. Tea is commonly prepared using Philippine wild tea or tea tree. There are several known variations of tea using different additives. Pandan iced tea is one of these, made with pandan leaves and lemongrass (locally known as tanglad). Salabat, sometimes called ginger tea, is brewed from ginger root and usually served during the cold months, and when illnesses such as flu or sore throat strikes.

The late 2010s saw the opening of teahouses in major cities, and with a glass of milk tea being more affordable than the usual cold designer coffee, it paved the way into making tea a well-known food trend. Notable teahouse chains in the Philippines are Chatime and Serenitea.

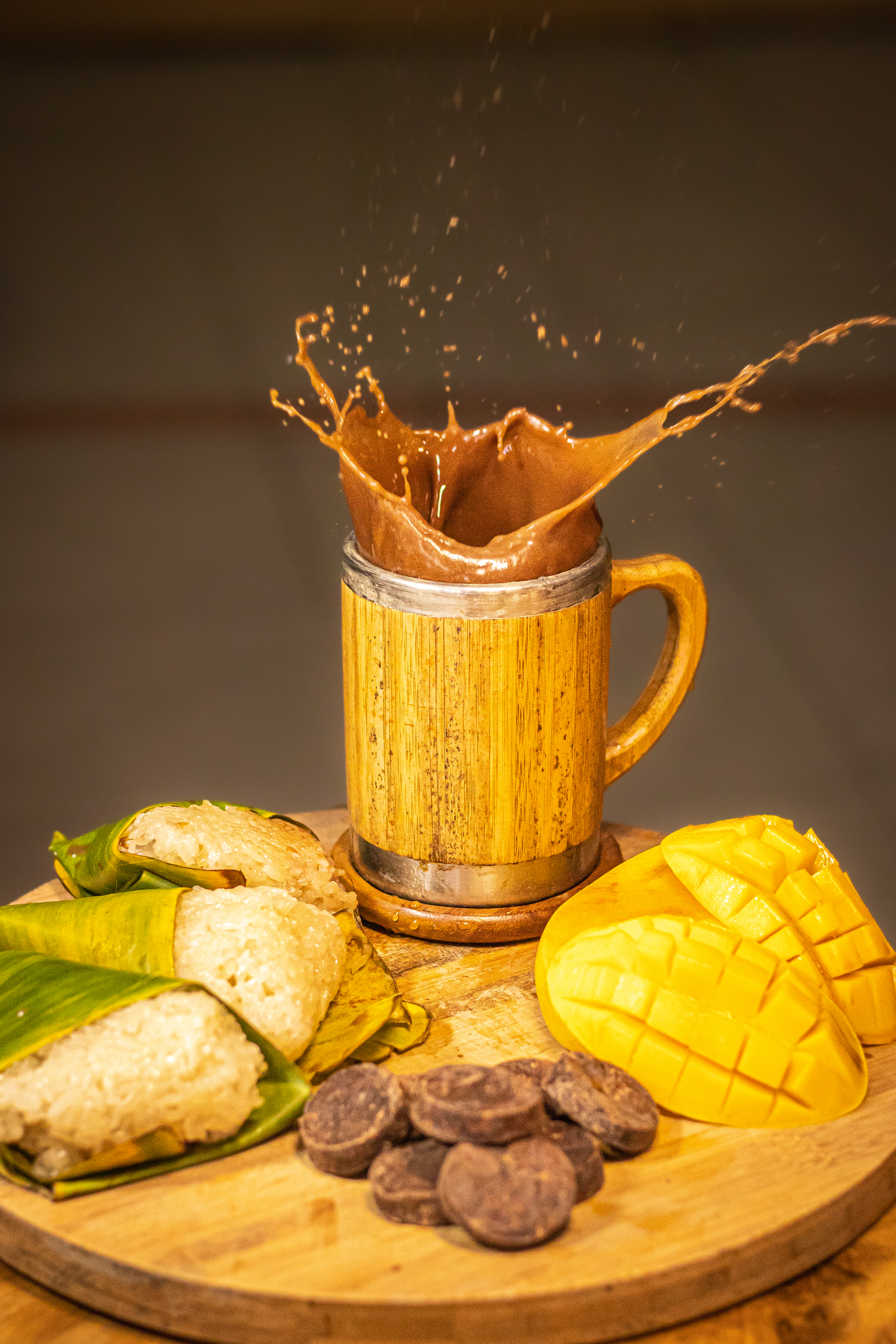
Sikwate, a Filipino hot chocolate made from cacao.

Tsokolate is the Filipino style of hot chocolate. It is traditionally made with tablea, which are pure cacao beans that are dried, roasted, ground and then formed into tablets. It is also popular during Christmas season, particularly among children.

=== Alcoholic beverages ===
The Philippines has various locally manufactured alcoholic drinks. Red Horse is one of the most popular beer.

Traditional drinks

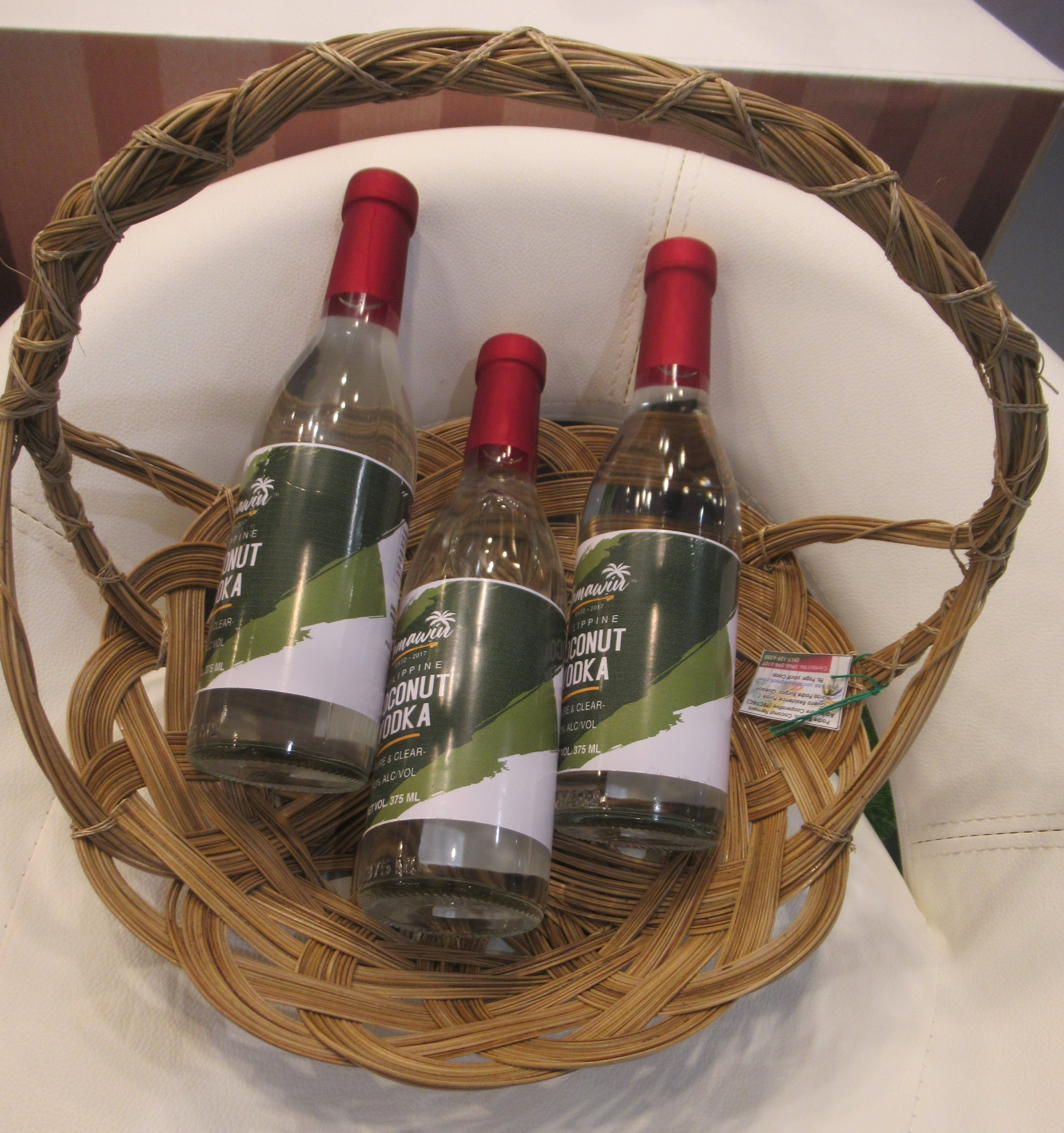
Lambanog, a traditional Filipino distilled coconut liquor.

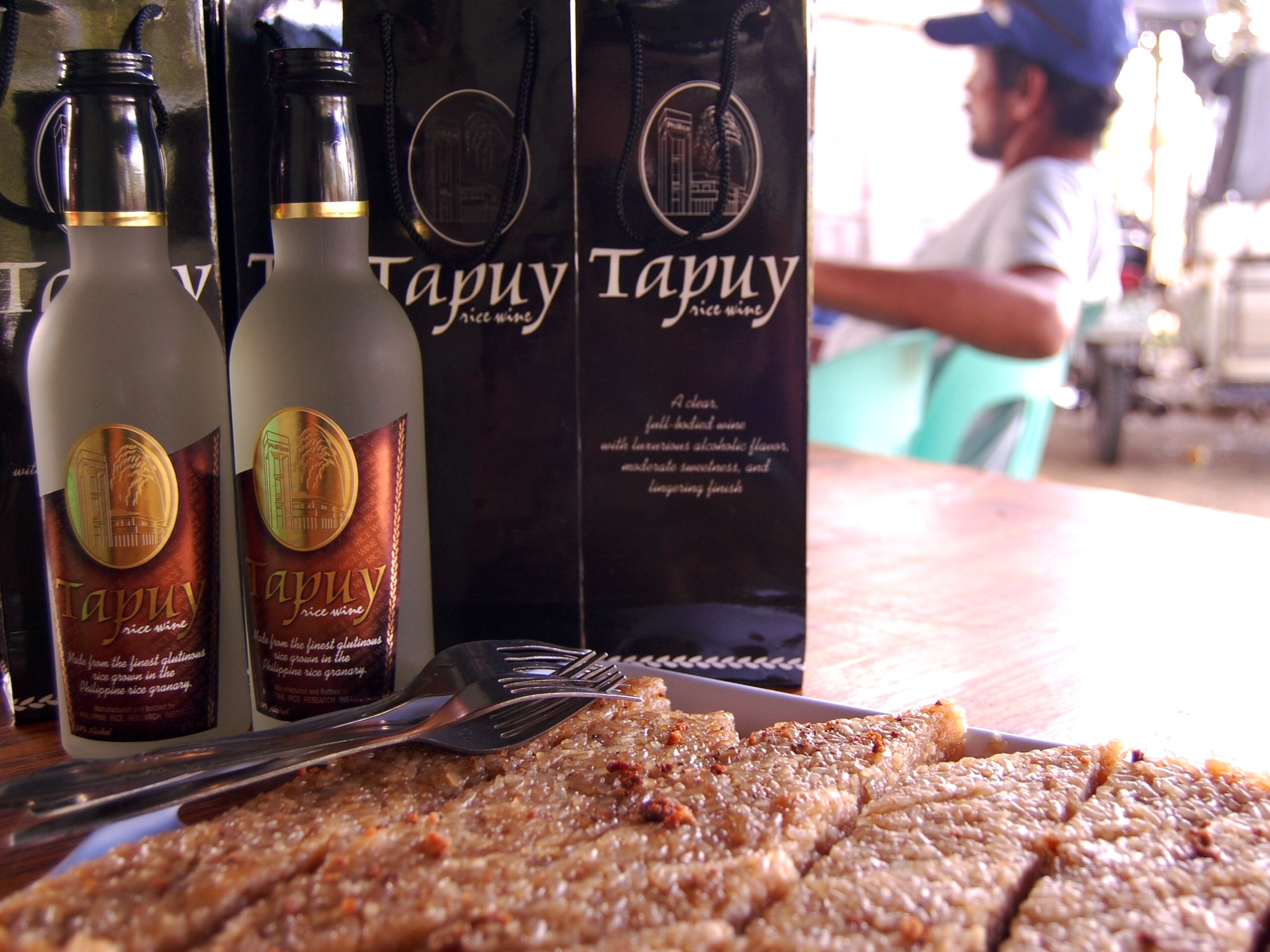
Tapuy, a rice wine made from fermented glutinous rice from Cordillera.

Tuba (toddy) is a type of hard liquor made from fresh drippings extracted from a cut young stem of palm. The cutting of the palm stem usually done early in the morning by a mananguete, a person who climbs palm trees and extracts the tuba to supply to customers later in the day. The morning's accumulated palm juice or drippings are then harvested by noon, and brought to buyers then prepared for consumption. Sometimes this is done twice a day so that there are two harvests of tuba occurring first at noon-time and then in the late-afternoon.

Normally, tuba has to be consumed right after the mananguete brings it over, or it becomes too sour to be consumed as a drink. Any remaining unconsumed tuba is then often stored in jars to ferment for several days and become palm vinegar. Tuba can be distilled to produce lambanog (arrack), a neutral liquor often noted for its relatively high alcohol content.

Lambanog is an alcoholic beverage commonly described as coconut wine or coconut vodka. The drink is distilled from the sap of the unopened coconut flower, and is known for its potency and high alcohol content (80 and 90 proof). Most of the Lambanog distilleries are in the Quezon province of Luzon, Philippines. Constant efforts at standardizing lambanog production has led to its better quality. Presently, lambanog is being exported to other countries and continues to win foreign customers over due to its natural ingredients as well as its potency.

Tapuy is a traditional Philippine alcoholic drink made from fermented glutinous rice. It is a clear wine of luxurious alcoholic taste, moderate sweetness and lingering finish. Its average alcohol content is 14% or 28 proof, and it does not contain any preservatives or sugar. To increase the awareness of tapuy, the Philippine Rice Research Institute has created a cookbook containing recipes and cocktails from famous Filipino chefs and bartenders, featuring tapuy as one of the ingredients.

Modern drinks

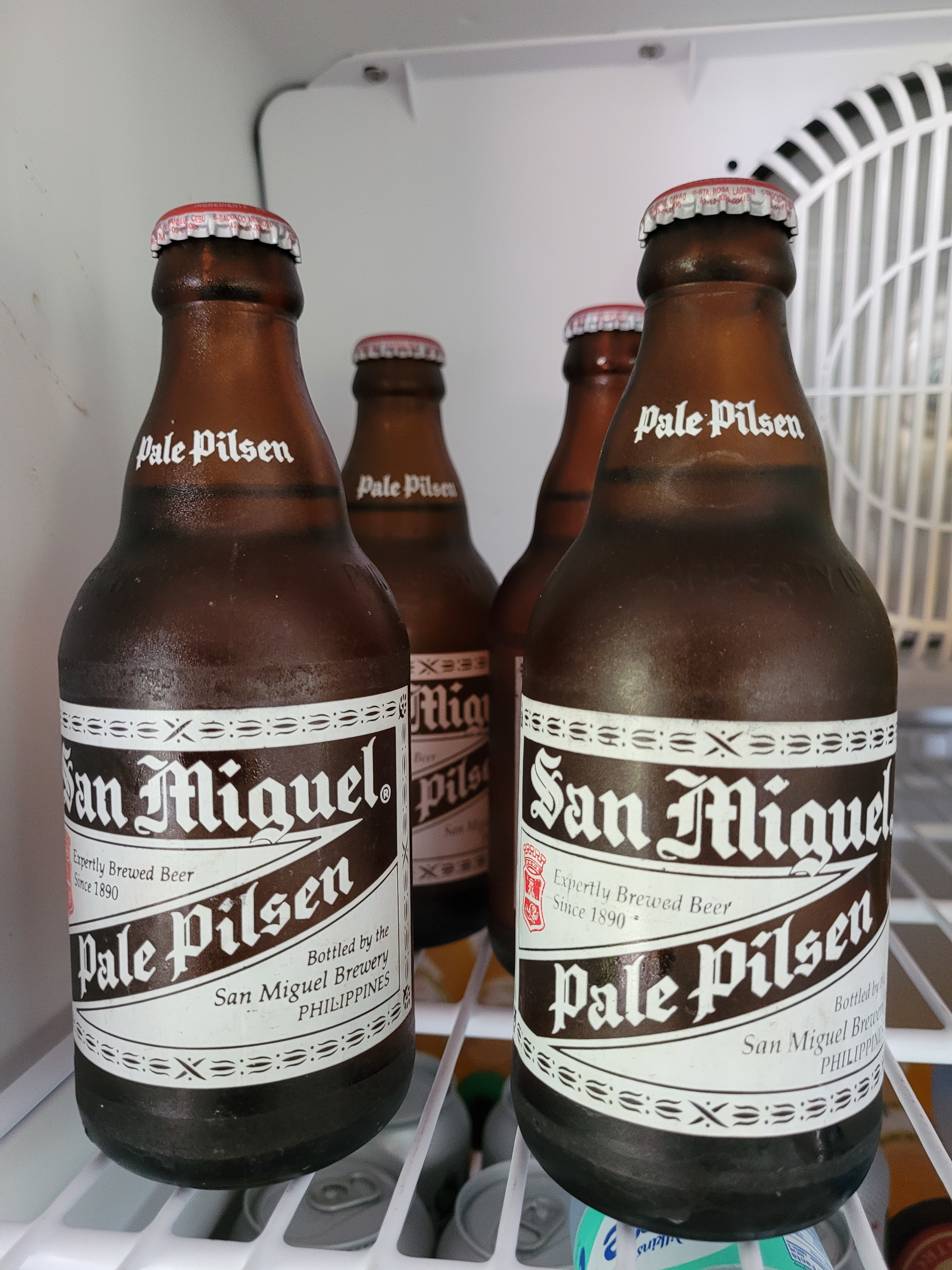
Cerveza, specifically San Miguel Pale Pilsen, a popular Filipino beer.

Beer or serbesa (from the Spanish "cerveza") is the most widely available alcoholic drink in the Philippines. San Miguel Pale Pilsen is the most popular and widely sold brand. Together with associated San Miguel beer brands such as San Mig Light and Gold Eagle Beer the company holds an aggregate market share of 92.7%.

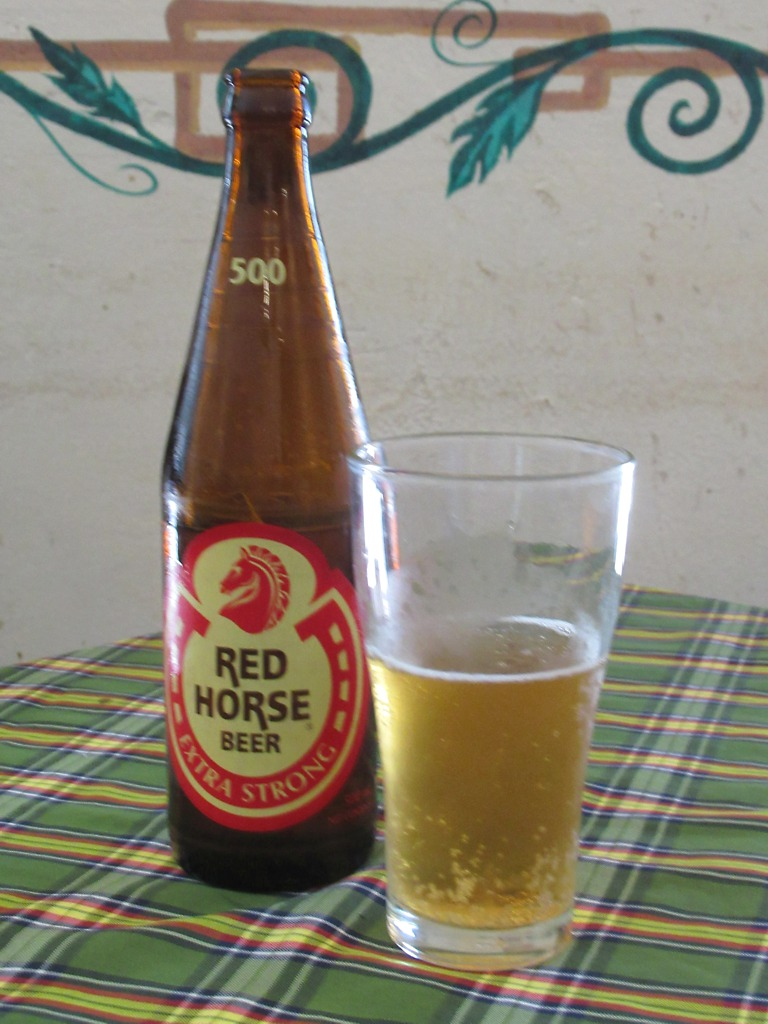
Red horse, a stronger beer.

Beer na Beer produced by local conglomerate Asia Brewery is another widely sold pale Pilsner style beer. Asia Brewery also produces under license and distributes a number of other mass market beers such as Colt 45, Asahi Super Dry, Heineken and Tiger Beer. Other beer labels include Red Horse Beer, Lone Star, Lone Star Light, Lone Star Ultra, Carlsberg, Coors Light, San Miguel Superdry, San Mig Strong Ice, and just recently, Manila Beer. Echoing trends in international markets, bars in urban areas have also begun to serve locally produced and imported craft beers in a variety of styles.

Rum is often associated with Tanduay.

Several gins, both local varieties like Ginebra San Miguel (as well as GSM Blue and GSM Premium Gin) and imported brands like Gilbey's, are commonly found. Some people refer to gin by the shape of the bottle: bilog for a circular bottle and kwatro kantos (literally meaning four corners) for a square or rectangular bottle. Gin is sometimes combined with other ingredients to come up with variations.

== Street food ==
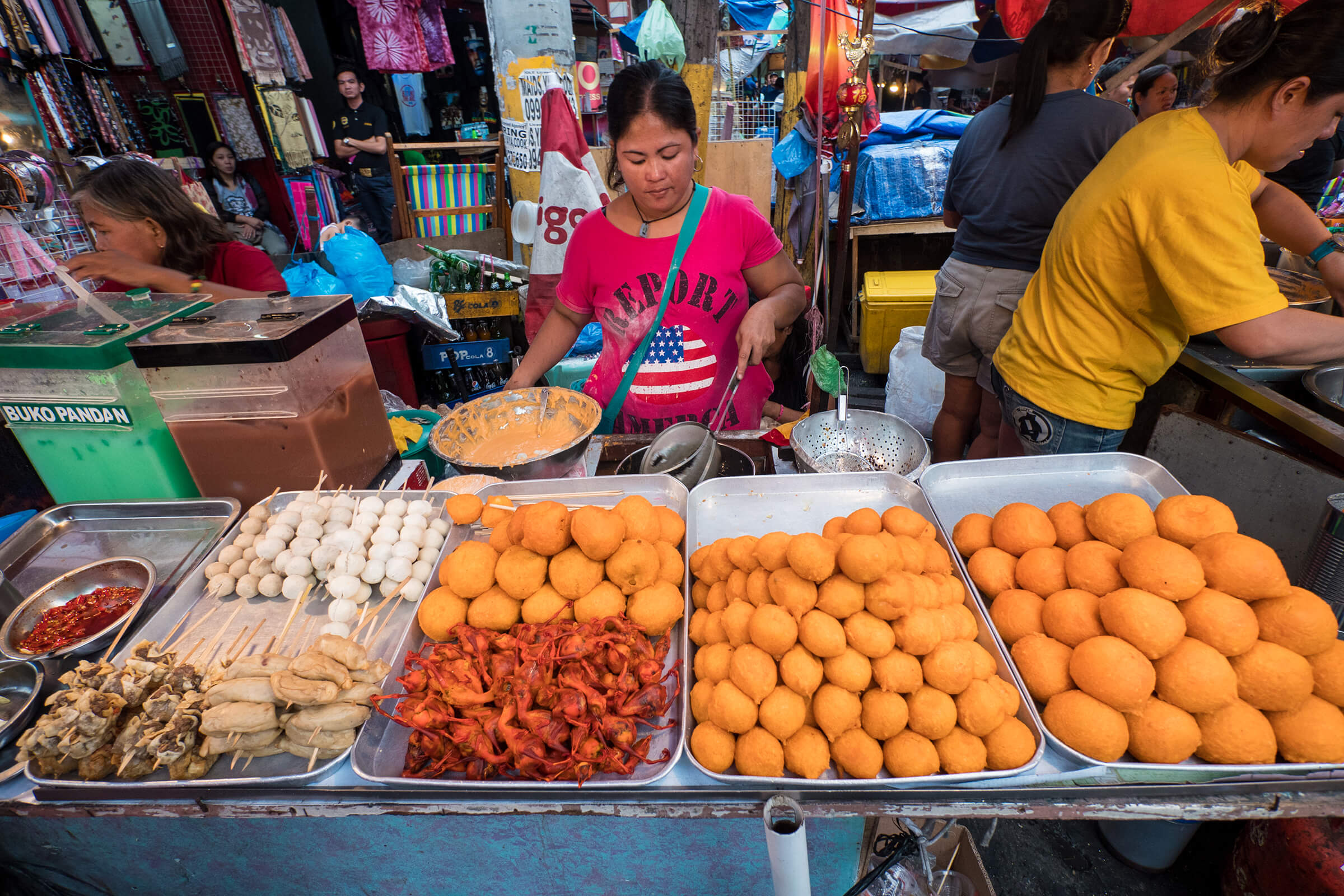
Filipino street vendor in Manila sells various street foods such as tokneneng, kwek-kwek, kikiam, one-day-old, squid balls, and more.

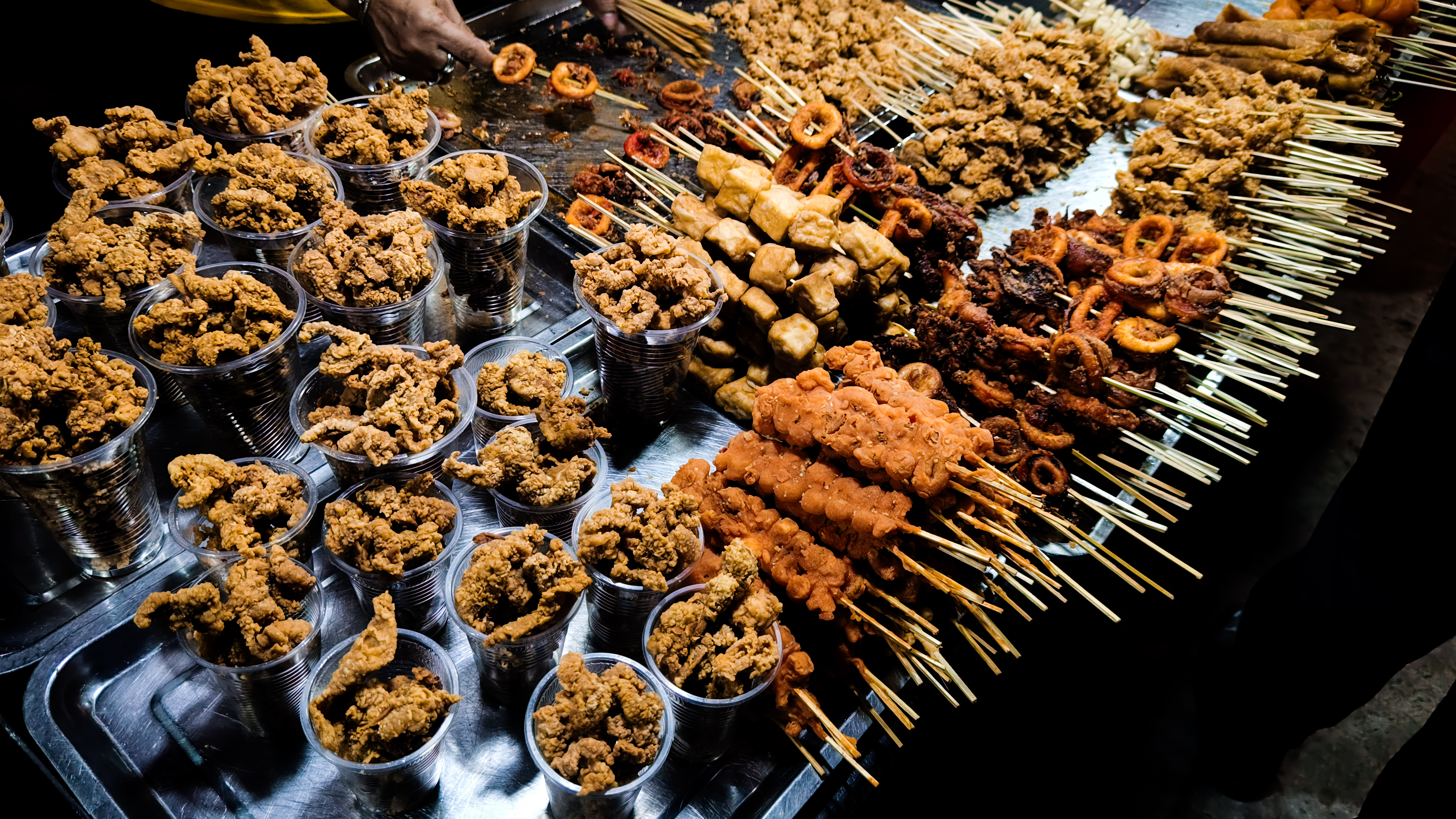
A bunch of Filipino street food skewers.

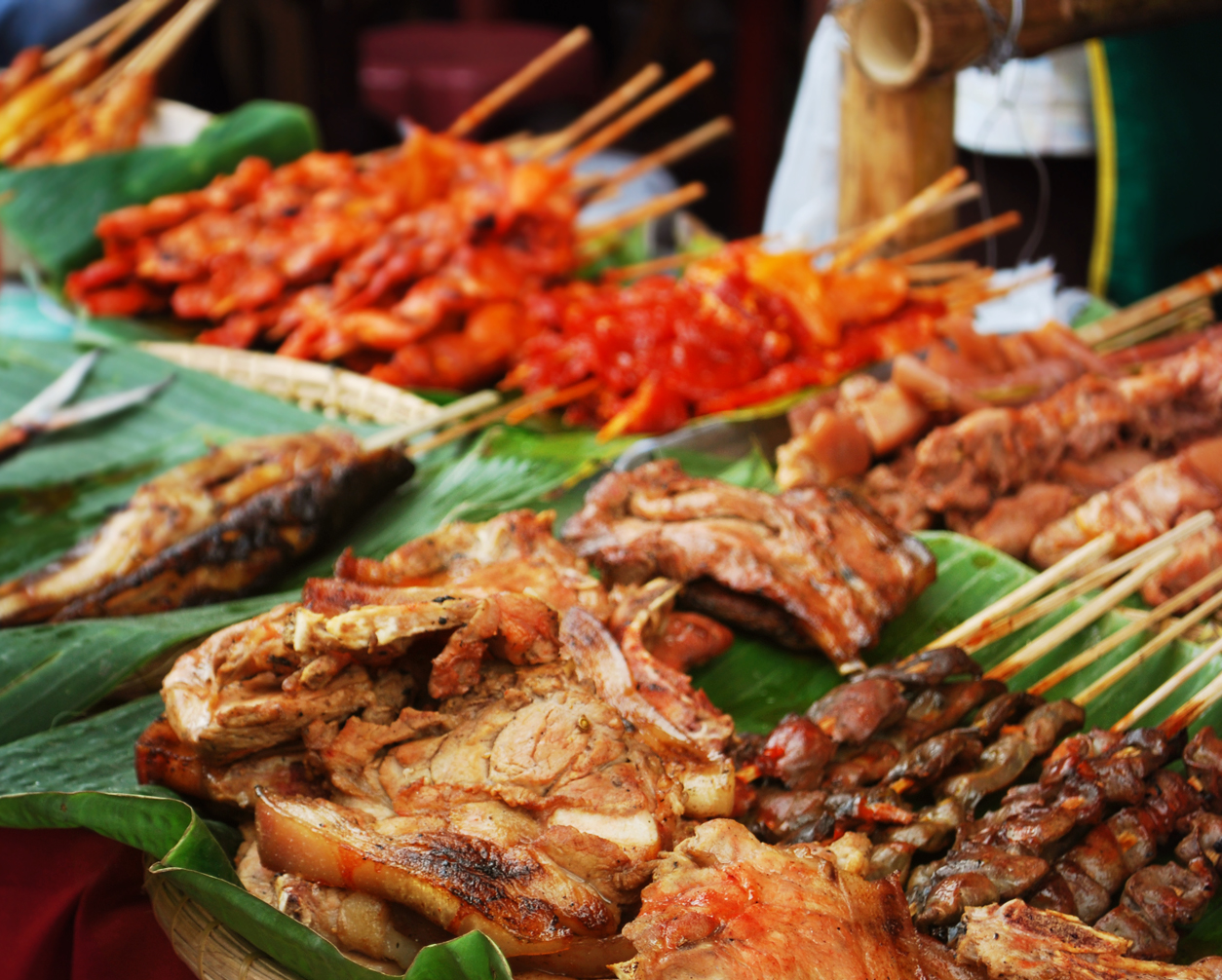
Inihaw skewers street foods in Iloilo City

Aside from pastries and desserts, there are heartier snacks for merienda that can also serve as either an appetizer or side dish for a meal. Siomai is the local version of Chinese shaomai. Lumpia are spring rolls that can be either fresh or fried. Fresh lumpia (lumpiang sariwa) is usually made for fiestas or special occasions as it can be labor-intensive to prepare, while one version of fried lumpia (lumpiang prito), lumpiang shanghai, is usually filled with ground pork and a combination of vegetables, and served with a sweet and sour dipping sauce. Other variations are filled with minced pork and shrimp and accompanied by a vinegar-based dipping sauce. Lumpia has been commercialized in frozen food form. Beef pares is a common street food in Manila. Middle Eastern food such as the shawarma became popular in the Philippines in the late 1980s.

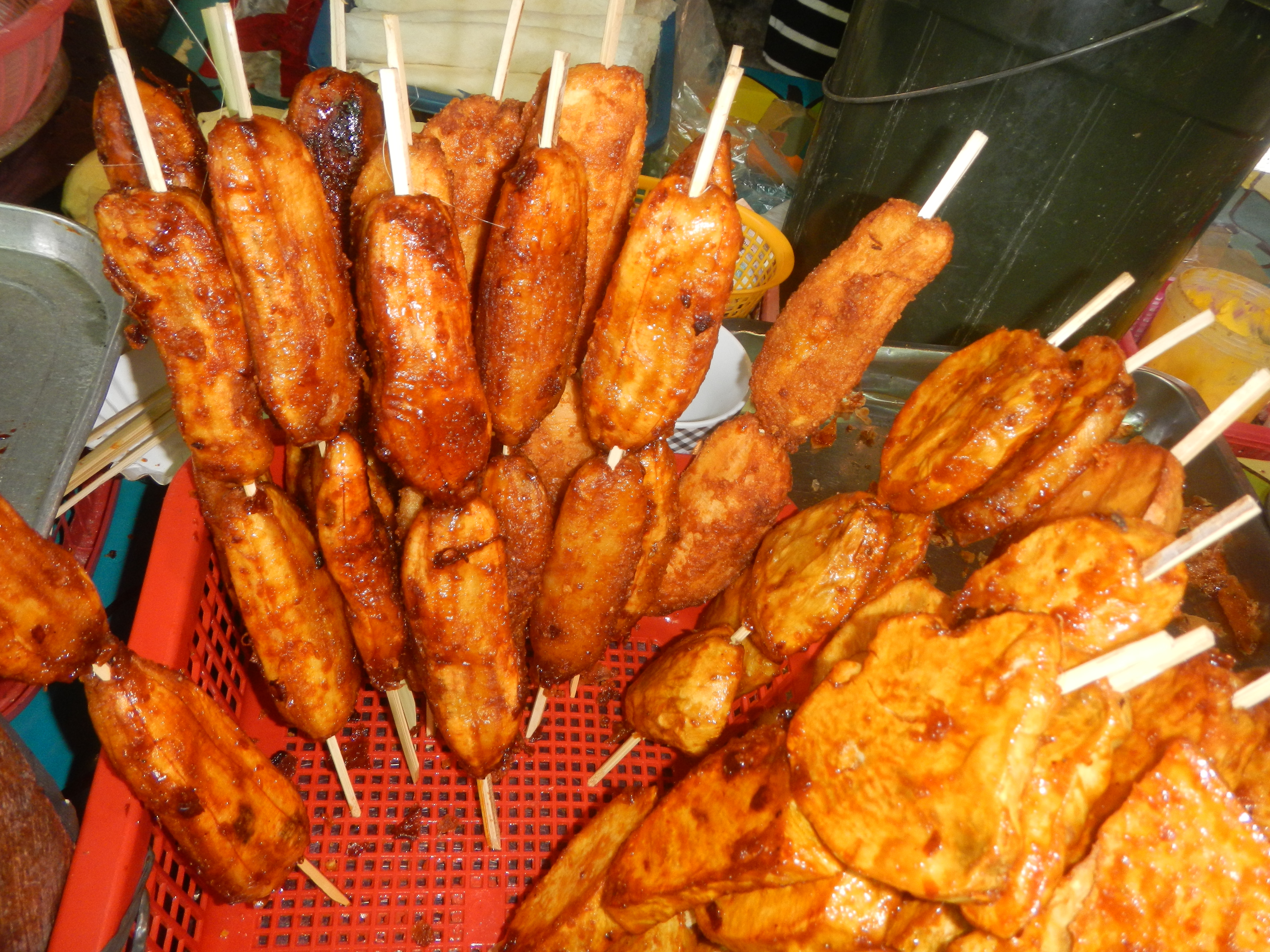
Banana cue, is a popular street food made from caramelized saba bananas.

There is a distinct range of street food available in the Philippines. Some of these are skewered on sticks in the manner of a kebab. One such example is banana-cue, a whole banana or plantain skewered on a short thin bamboo stick, rolled in brown sugar, and pan-fried. Kamote-cue is a peeled sweet potato skewered on a stick, covered in brown sugar and then pan-fried. Fish balls or squid balls, including calamares, are also pan-fried, then skewered on bamboo sticks and given to the customer, who then has a choice of dipping in a sweet or savory sauce. These are commonly sold frozen in markets and peddled by street vendors.

Turon, a kind of lumpia consisting of an eggroll or phyllo wrapper commonly filled with sliced plantain and occasionally jackfruit, is fried and sprinkled with sugar.

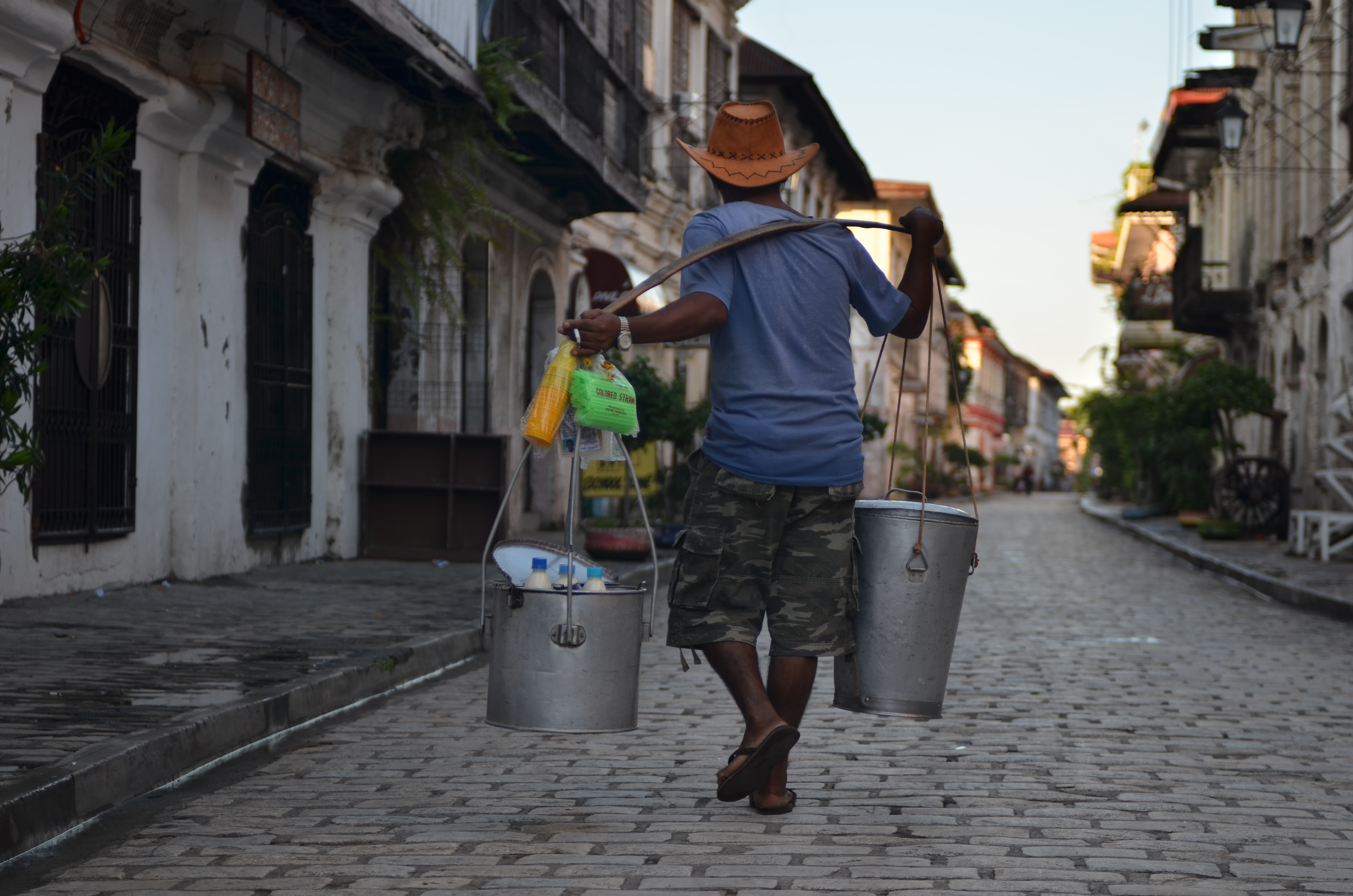
A magtataho (taho vendor) in Vigan City.

Taho is a warm treat made of soft beancurd which is the taho itself, dark caramel syrup called arnibal, and tapioca pearls. It is often sold in neighborhoods by street vendors who yell out "taho!" in a manner like that of vendors in the stands at sporting events yelling out "hotdogs" or "peanuts". Sometimes, taho is served chilled, and flavors have recently been added, such as chocolate or strawberry. Taho is derived from the original Chinese snack food known as douhua.

There is also iskrambol (from the English "to scramble"), a kind of iced-based treat similar to a sorbet. The shaved ice is combined with various flavorings and usually topped with chocolate syrup. It is eaten by "scrambling" the contents or mixing them, then drinking with a large straw. It was later modified into ice scramble, or simply scramble, but with added skim milk, chocolate or strawberry syrup, and a choice of toppings such as marshmallows, chocolate or candy sprinkles, rice crispies, or tapioca pearls.

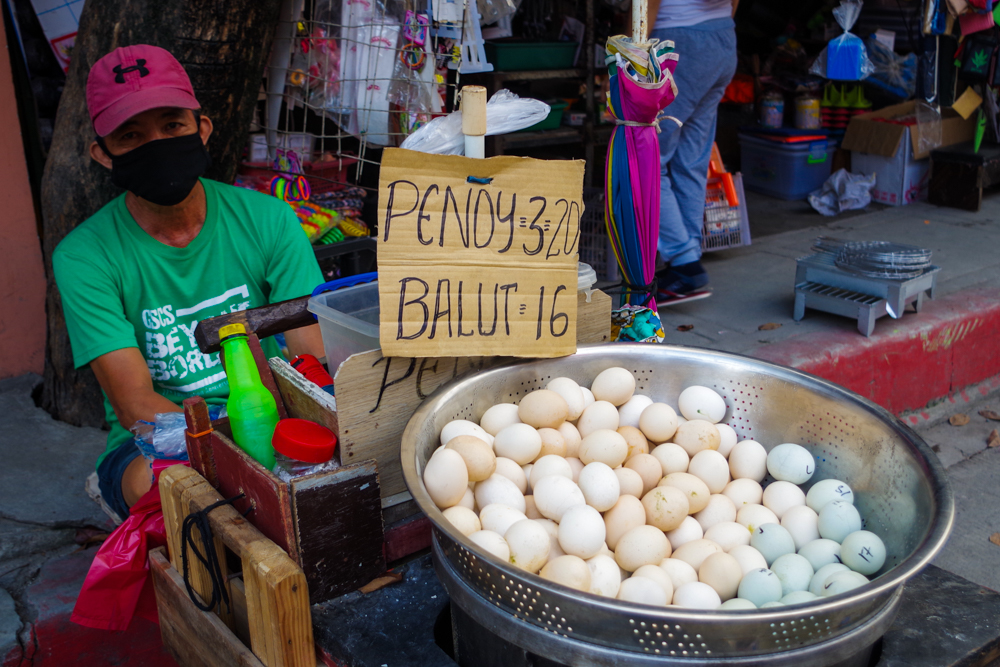
Balut and penoy street vendor

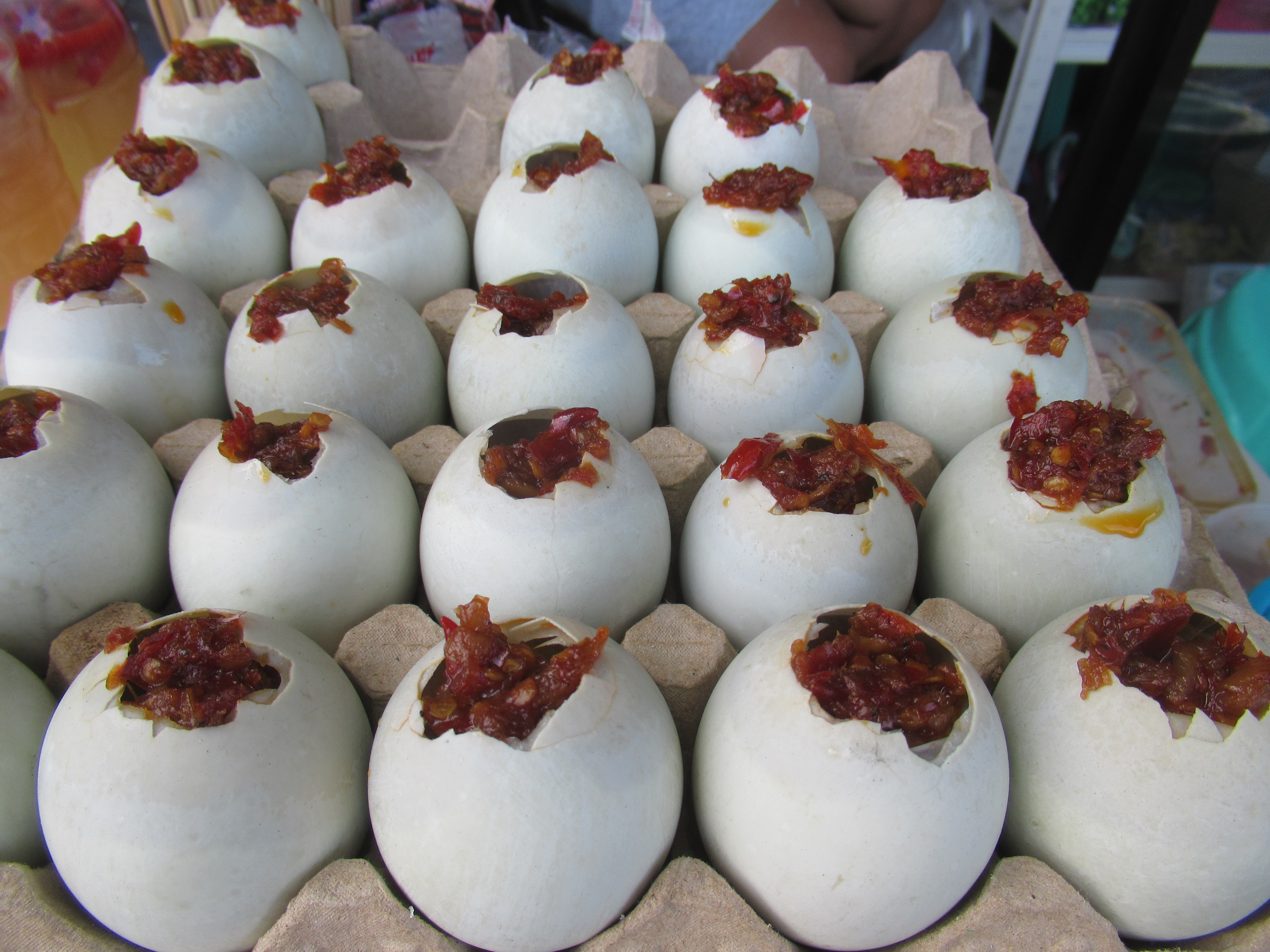
Grilled balut

Street food featuring eggs include kwek-kwek which are hard-boiled quail eggs dipped in orange-dyed batter and then deep fried similar to tempura. Tokneneng is a larger version of kwek-kwek using chicken or duck eggs. Another Filipino egg snack is balut, essentially a boiled pre-hatched poultry egg, usually duck or chicken. These fertilized eggs are allowed to develop until the embryo reaches a pre-determined size and are then boiled. They are consumed, usually along with vinegar and salt. There is also another egg item called penoy, which is basically hard-boiled unfertilized duck eggs that does not contain embryo. Like taho, balut is advertised by street hawkers calling out their product.

Okoy, also spelled as ukoy, is another batter-covered, deep-fried street food in the Philippines. Along with the batter, it normally includes bean sprouts, shredded pumpkin and very small shrimps, shells and all. It is commonly dipped in a combination of vinegar and chilli.

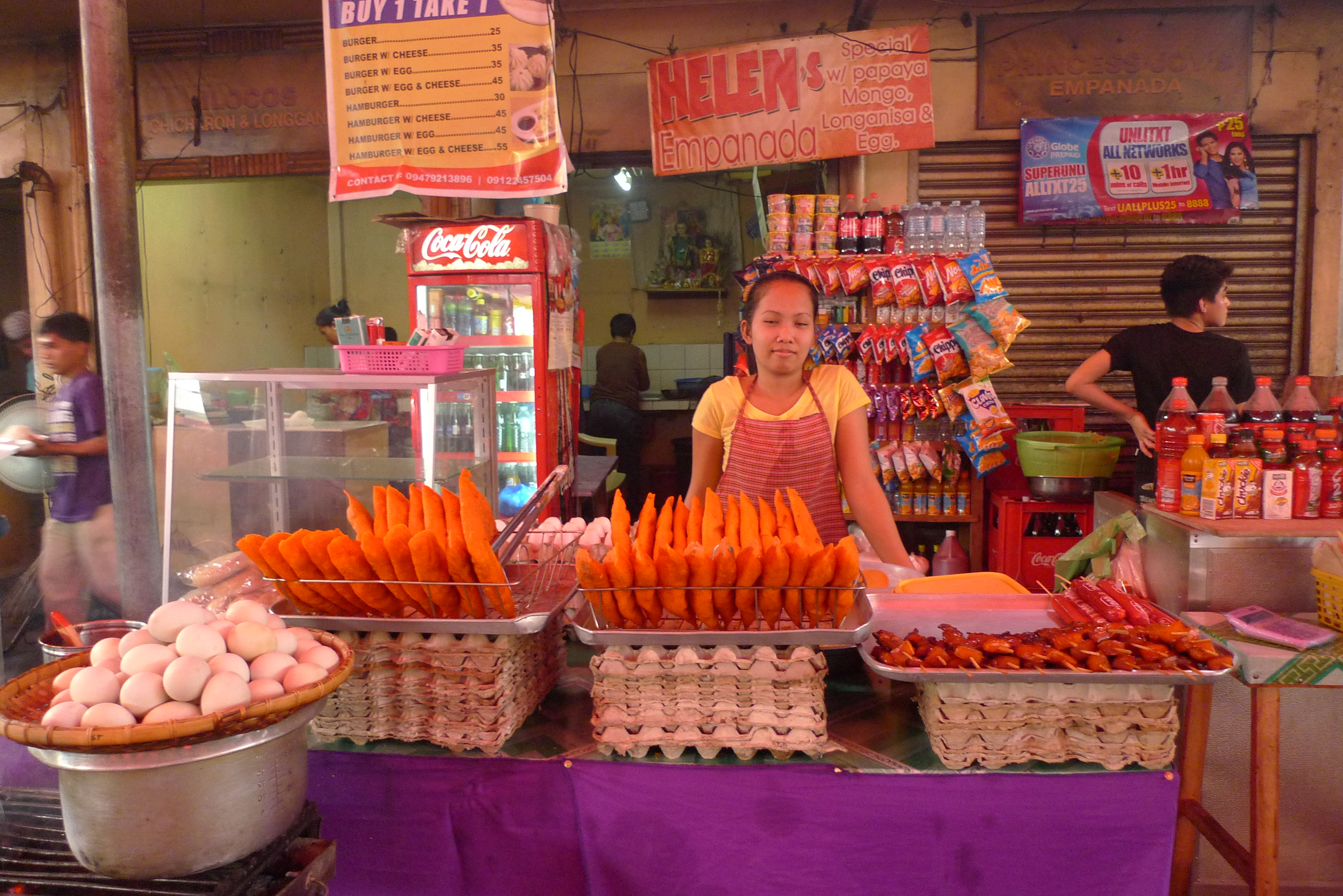
An empanada vendor selling Ilocos empanadas, a famous street food from the Ilocos Region.

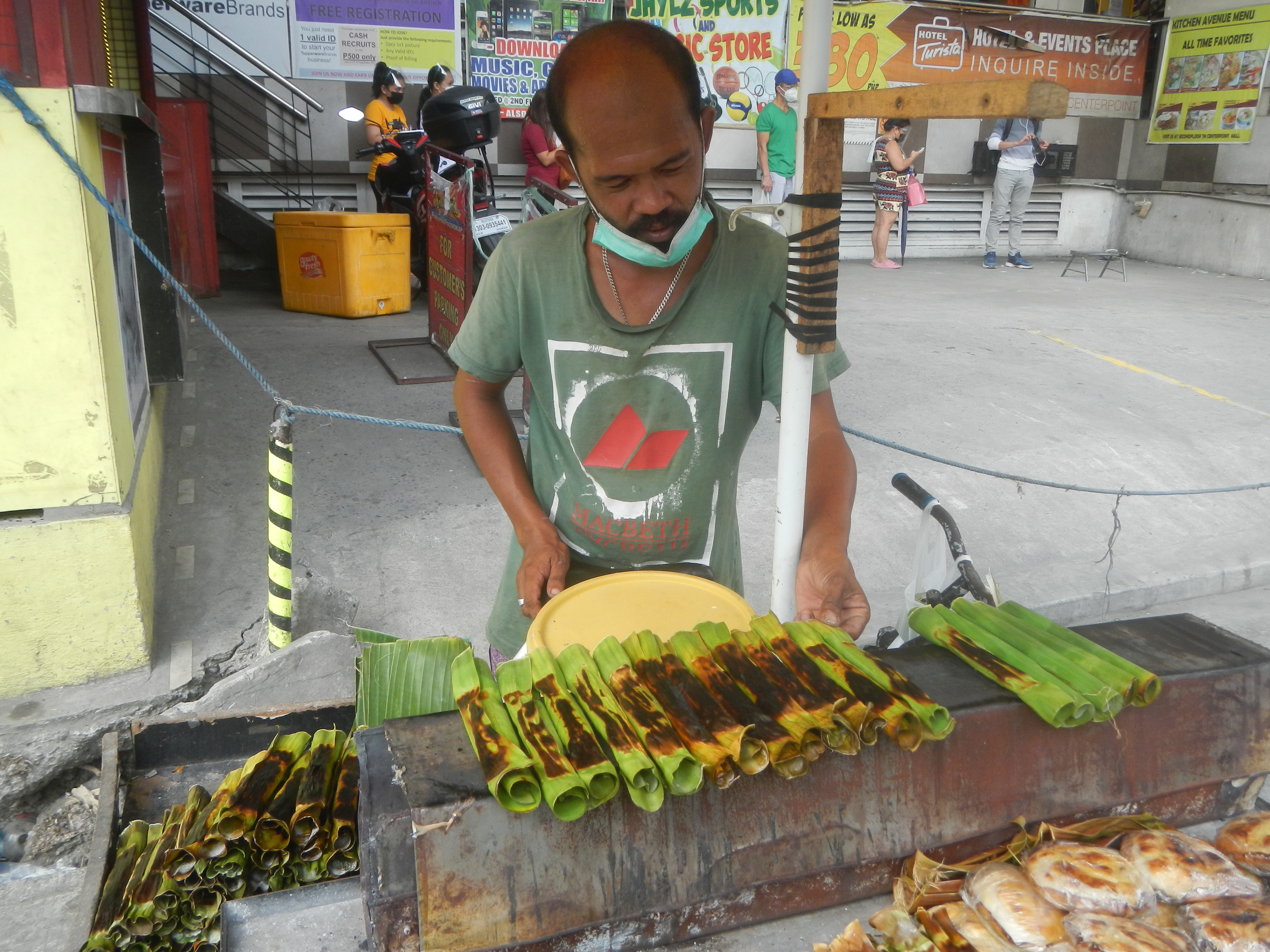
Tupig cart street vendor with an improvised sheet metal grill selling the dessert as street food.

Among other street food are already mentioned pulutan like isaw, seasoned hog or chicken intestines skewered onto a stick and grilled; betamax, roasted dried chicken blood cut into and served as small cubes, from which it received its name due to its crude resemblance to a Betamax tape; Adidas, grilled chicken feet named after the popular shoe brand; and proven, the proventriculus of a chicken coated in cornstarch and deep-fried. Fries made from sweet potatoes have also been dubbed "Pinoy fries". Most street foods are usually found near certain schools and universities, one example would be at Metro Manila's University Belt.

Numerous 24/7 burger stands across the country include Burger Machine (nicknamed "the burger that never sleeps"), Angel's Burger, Franks N' Burgers, and Minute Burger.

Pagpag is leftover food from restaurants (usually from fast-food restaurants) scavenged from garbage sites and dumps. Pagpag food can also be expired frozen meat, fish, or vegetables discarded by supermarkets and scavenged in garbage trucks where this expired food is collected and eaten by people suffering from the extreme poverty in the Philippines. Selling pagpag was a profitable business in areas where poor people live. Pagpag is basically more often than not food collected by homeless individuals at the end of the day from various local fastfood restaurants in the Philippines.

== Exotic dishes ==
Exotic dishes in Filipino cuisine refer to foods prepared from unconventional or less commonly consumed ingredients, often reflecting indigenous practices, rural resourcefulness, and historical necessity, particularly during periods such as World War II.

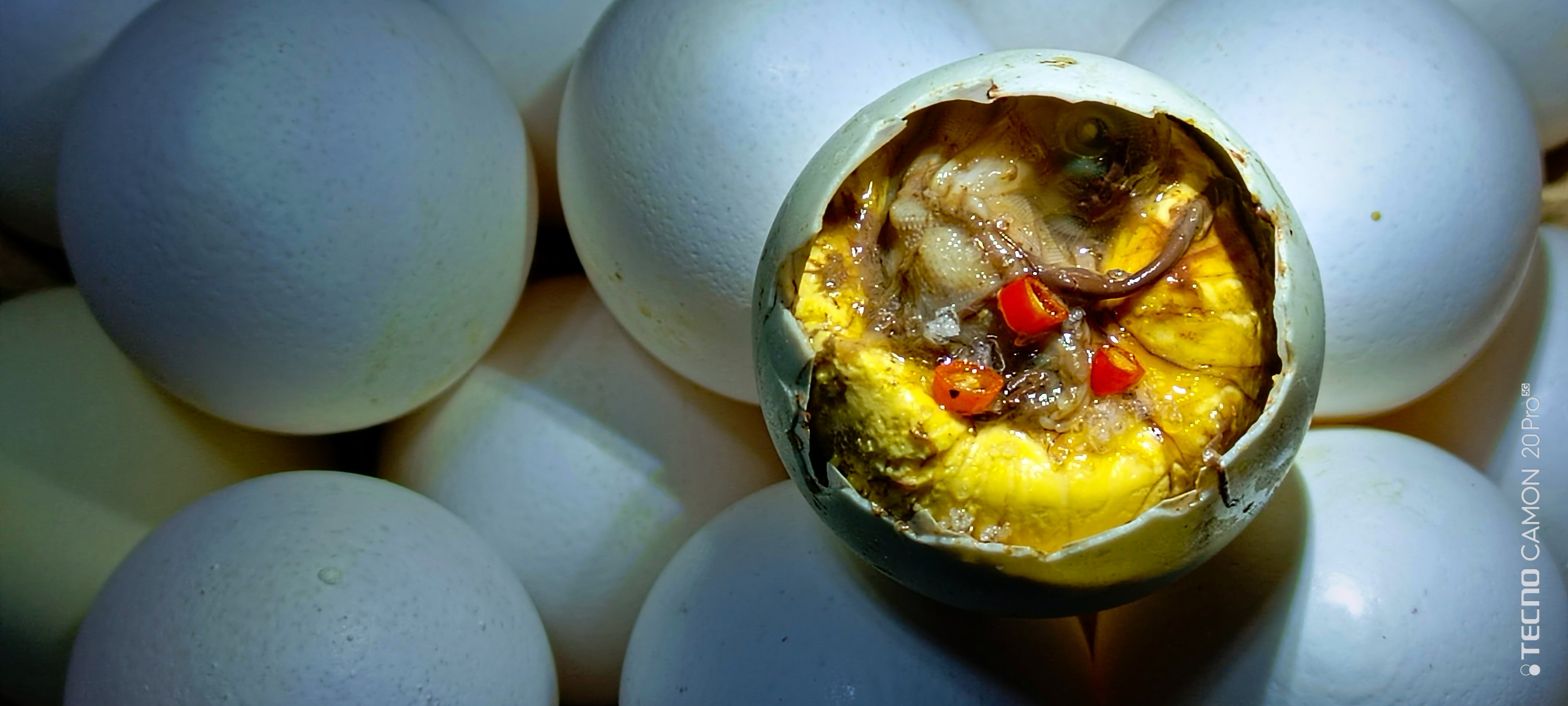
Balut, a boiled fertilized duck egg, typically eaten with salt and spiced vinegar.

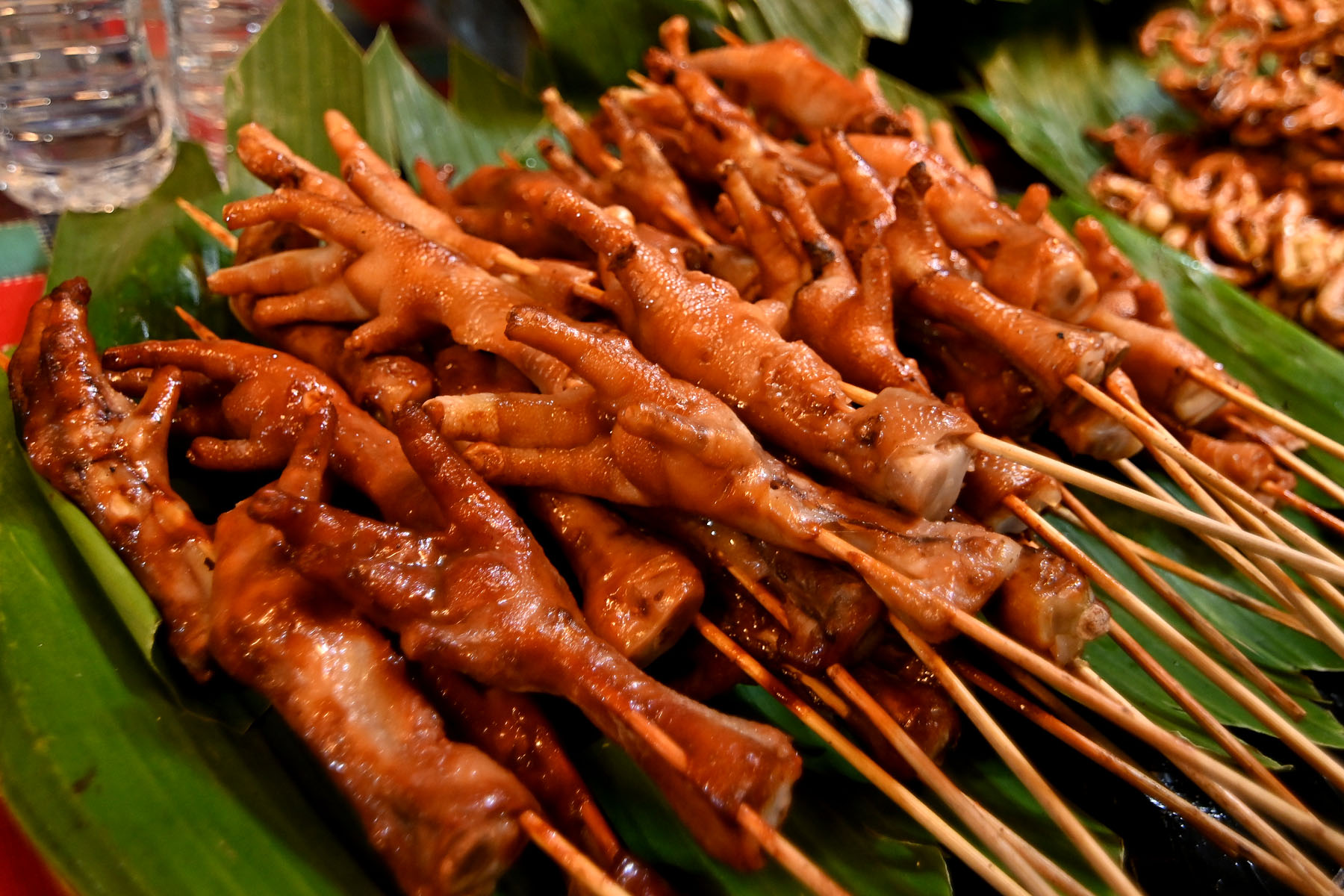
Adidas, a chicken feet skewers.

One of the most widely recognized Filipino exotic foods is balut, a boiled fertilized duck egg known for its savory broth and commonly sold as street food. Other street foods include isaw (grilled chicken intestines), adidas (chicken feet), and betamax (coagulated chicken blood skewers). Soup No. 5, a broth made from bull's genitals, (testicles and penis), is served in some eateries, especially along Ongpin Street in Binondo. It is also called “Remember Me” in Cagayan de Oro and lansiao in Cebu. In Davao City, crocodile lechon, or whole roasted crocodile, is a local specialty, with similar dishes also found in Palawan and Tanay.

In agricultural areas, especially rice fields, various species considered pests or invasive are utilized as food. Frogs (palakang bukid or betute) are prepared in dishes such as adobo, ginataan (with coconut milk), tinola, or deep-fried. Freshwater snails (kuhol or suso) are commonly cooked as ginataang kuhol. Insects such as mole crickets or camaru (Kapampangan) or ararawan (Ilocano), are sautéed or deep-fried, while in South Cotabato and Nueva Ecija, tipaklong (grasshoppers) are eaten fried for their crisp texture. In coconut plantations, coconut worms (uok, batod, abaling), are also consumed, it is typically prepared grilled, fried, or as kilawin. In Northern Luzon, abal-abal (june beetles) are consumed seasonally and abuos (weaver ant larvae) are also traditionally eaten, typically toasted or sautéed. In the rice terraces of Ifugao, swamp eels (kiwit) are consumed since it is destroying the rice terraces, it is commonly grilled and stewed.

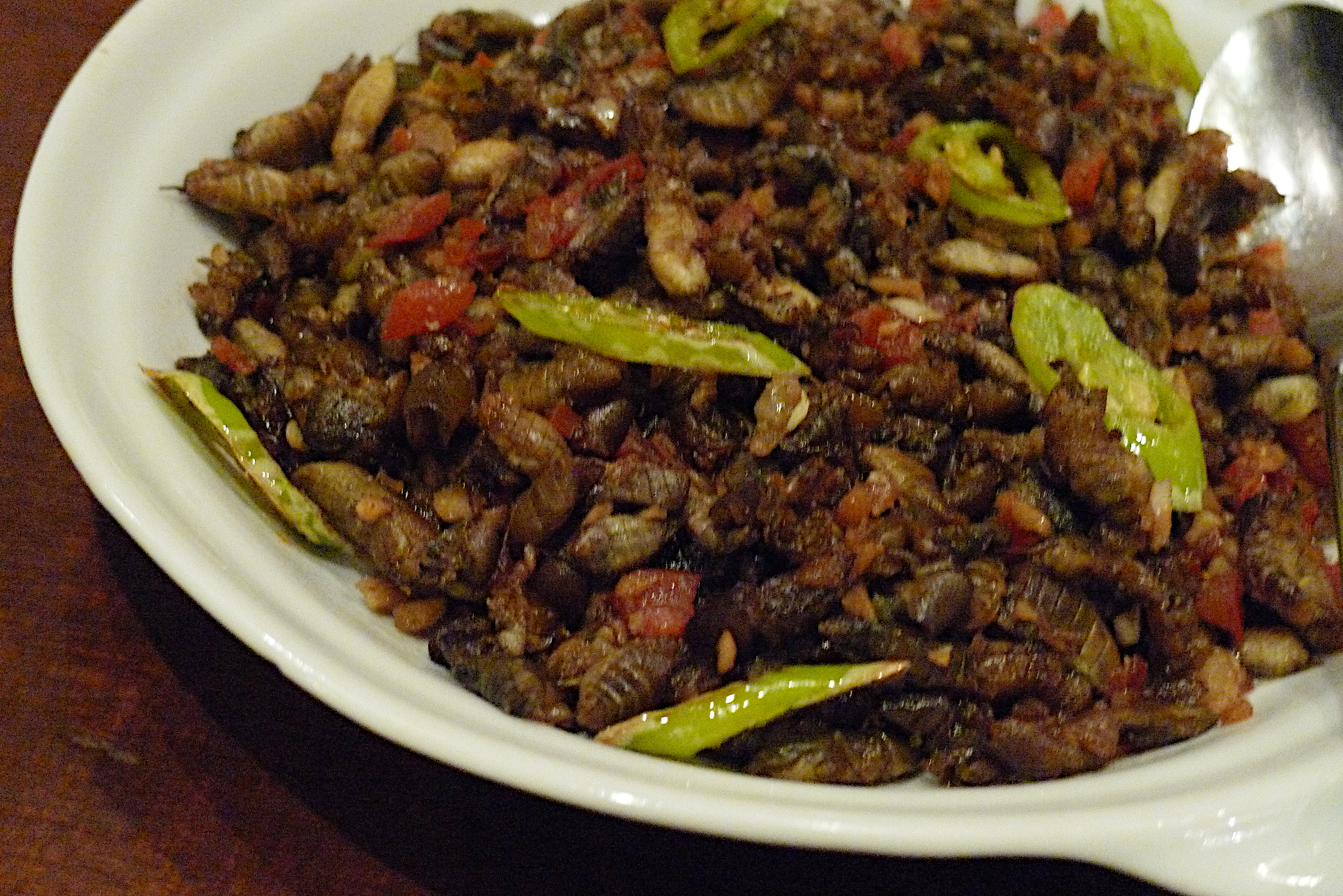
Camaru, or mole crickets cooked in adobo style.

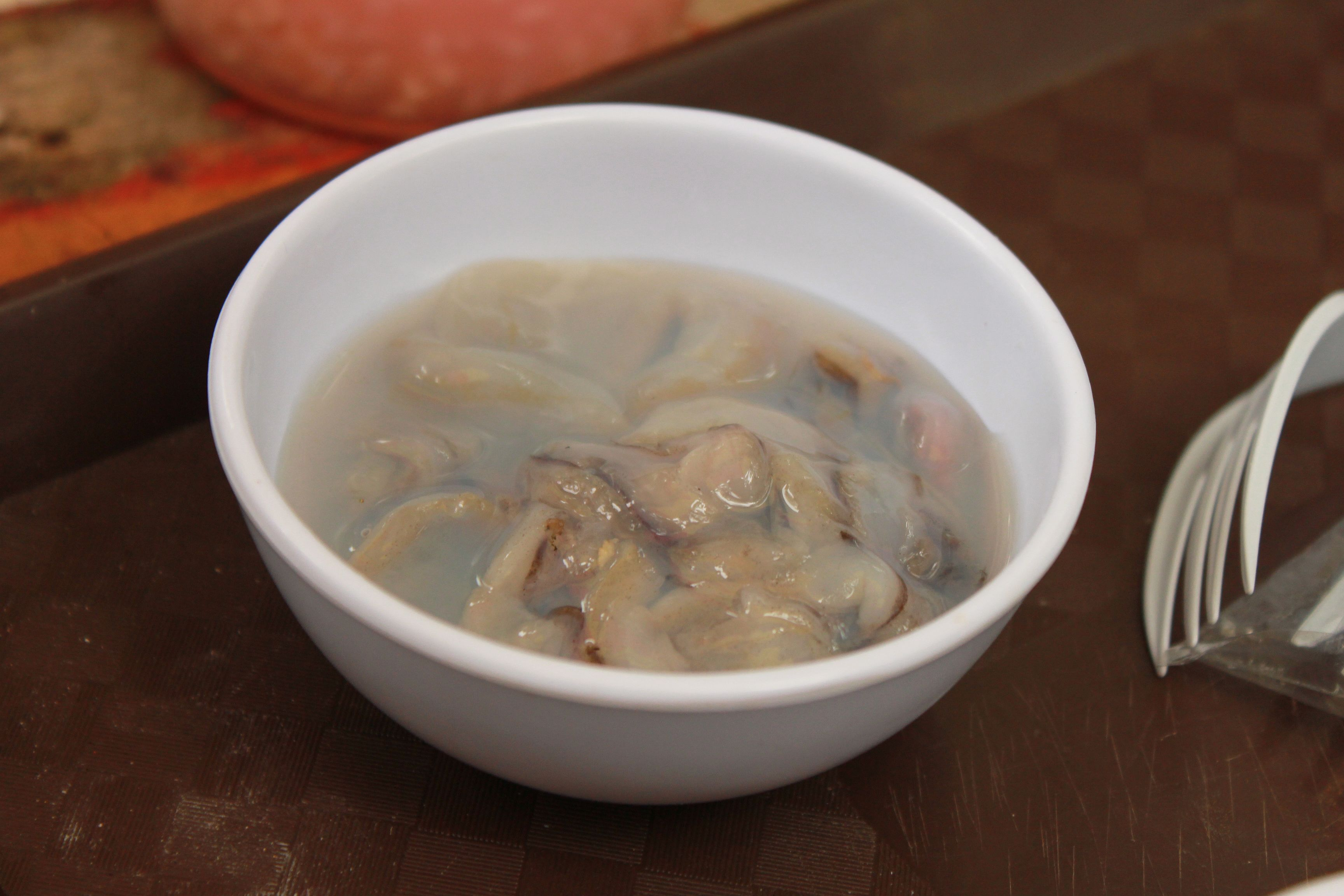
Tamilok, a woodworms mollusks or shipworms, typically eaten raw or kinilaw.

As an archipelagic country, the Philippines also features a range of exotic seafood. These include buriring (pufferfish), a seasonal delicacy in parts of Luzon and the Visayas, prepared as sour stews such as linarang or inun-unan, or fried. In Bohol, jellyfish (bubog lutaw) are consumed as kinilaw, and are also eaten in Palawan and Polillo Island. Sea cucumber (balat or balatan) is similarly prepared as kinilaw in parts of the Visayas and Northern Luzon. Other examples include saang (spider conch), typically grilled or cooked in soup; tamilok (wood-boring mollusks or shipworms), harvested from mangrove trees in Palawan, Aklan, and Capiz and eaten raw in vinegar; and puyoy, a brackish-water worm eel delicacy from Capiz, which is prepared grilled, fried, or dried.

== Cooking methods ==
The Filipino words commonly used for cooking methods and terms are listed below:

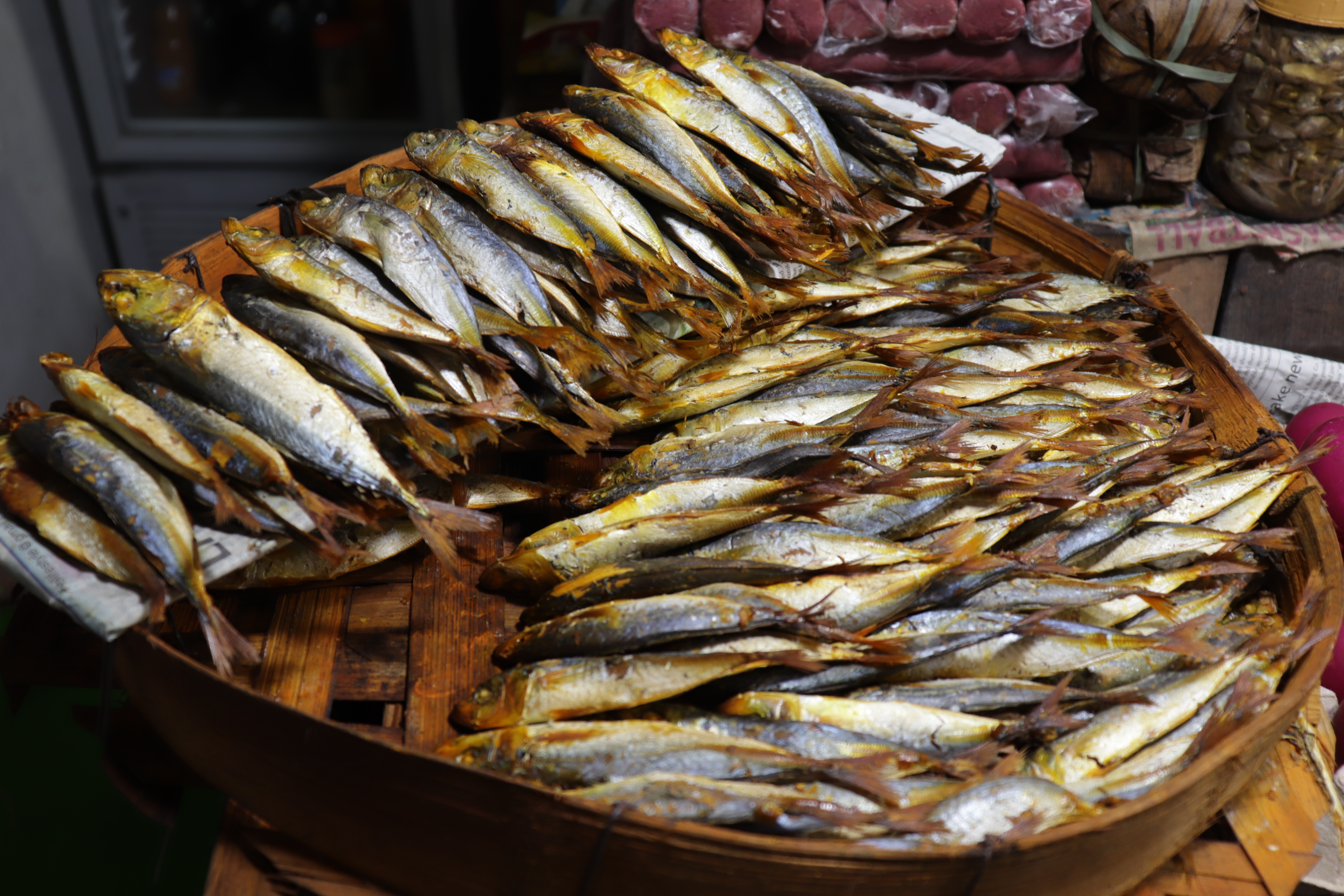
Tinapa, method of smoking fish over wood.

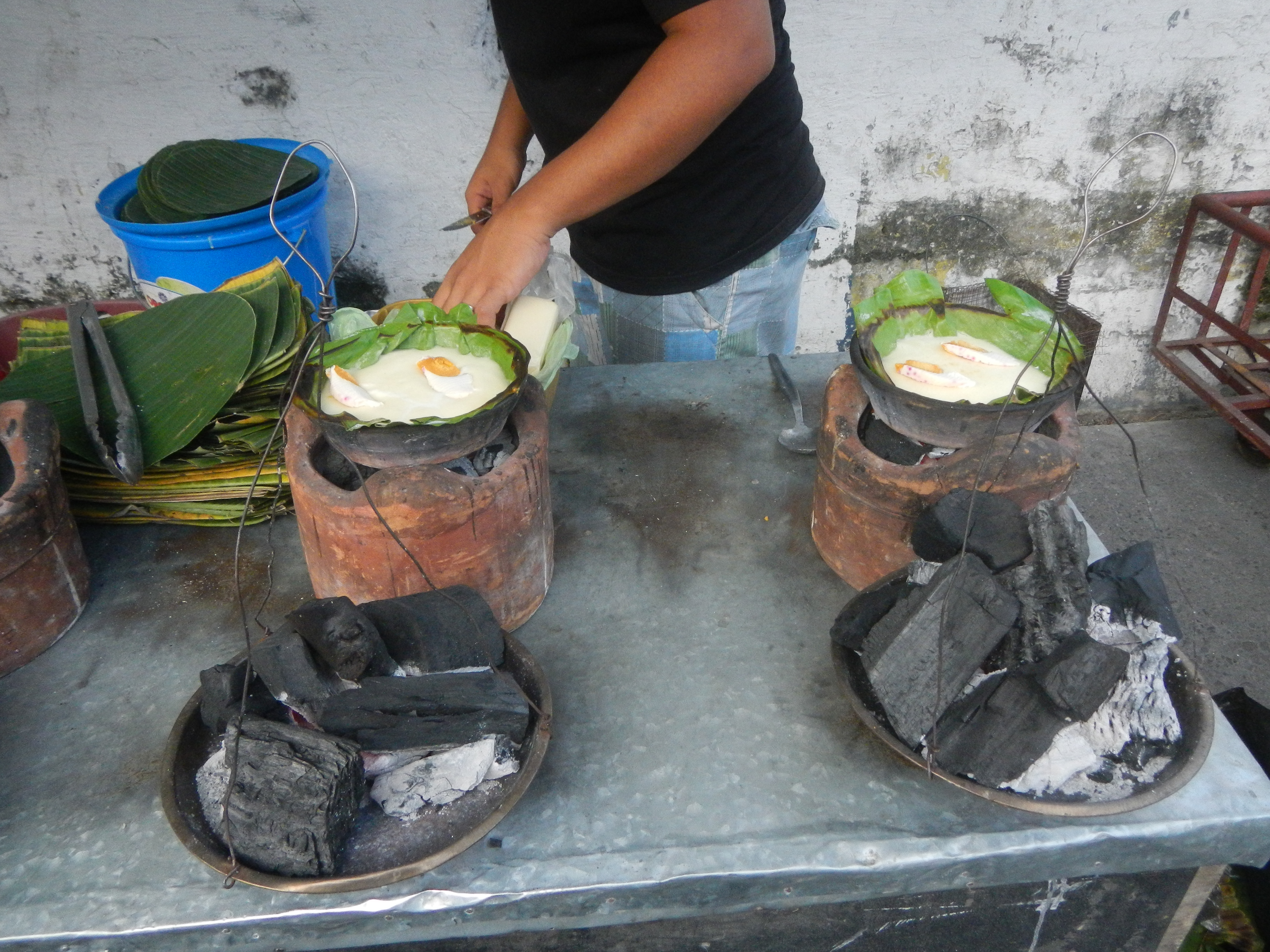
Bibingka, traditionally baked in clay pots lined with banana leaves.

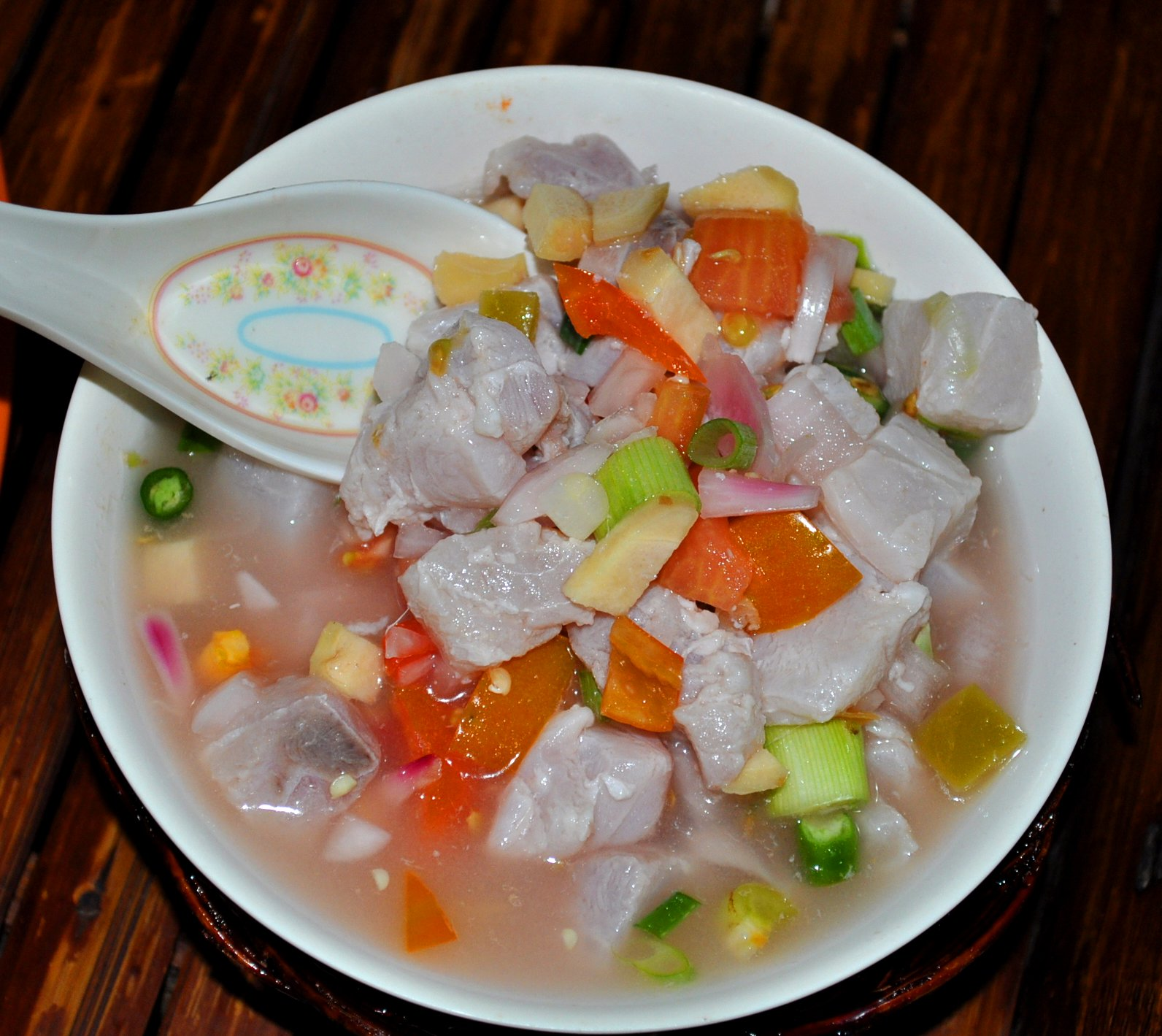
Kinilaw, the method of cooking raw meat in vinegar or citrus juice.

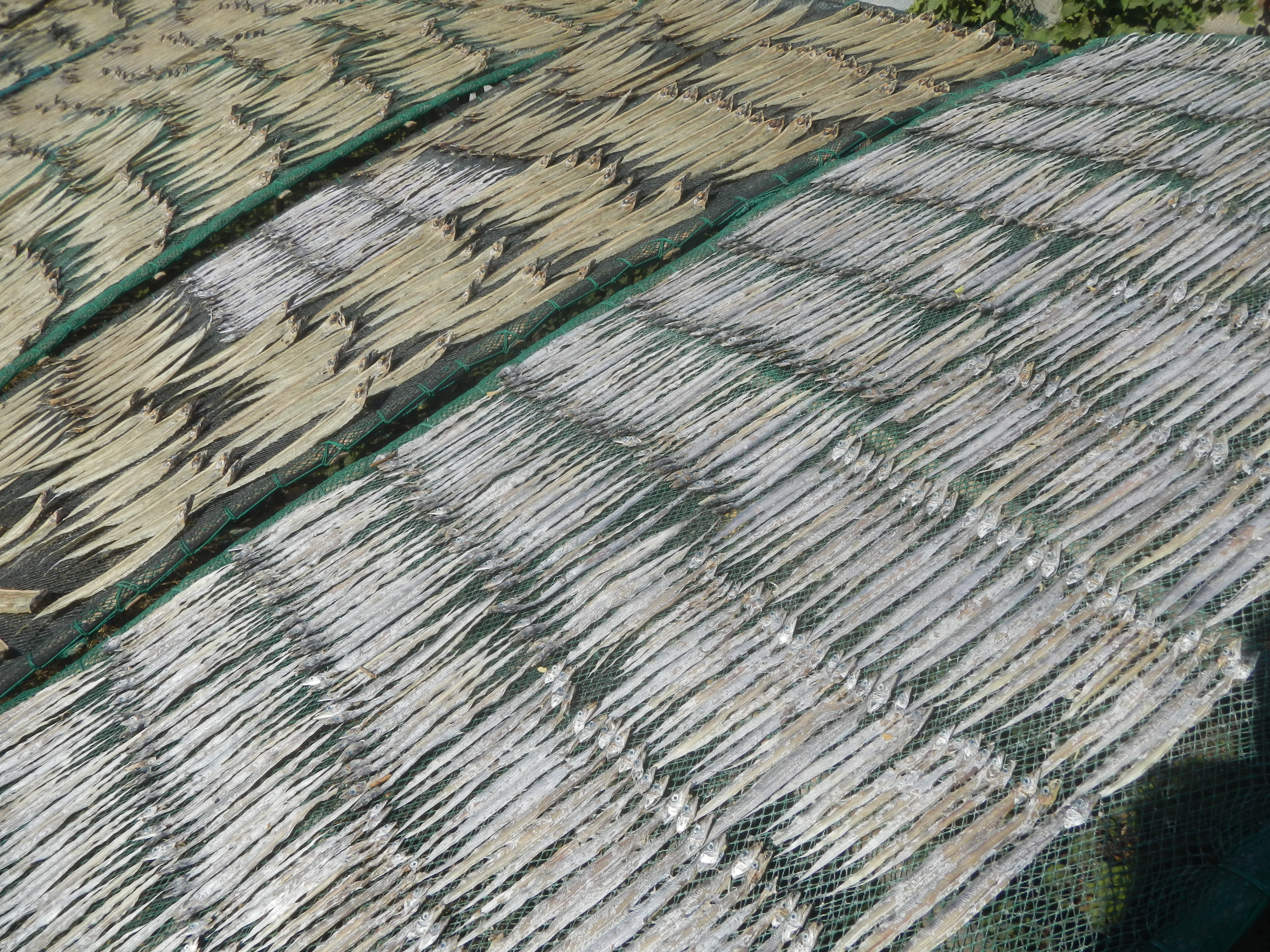
Daing, the method of preserving fish by sun-drying.

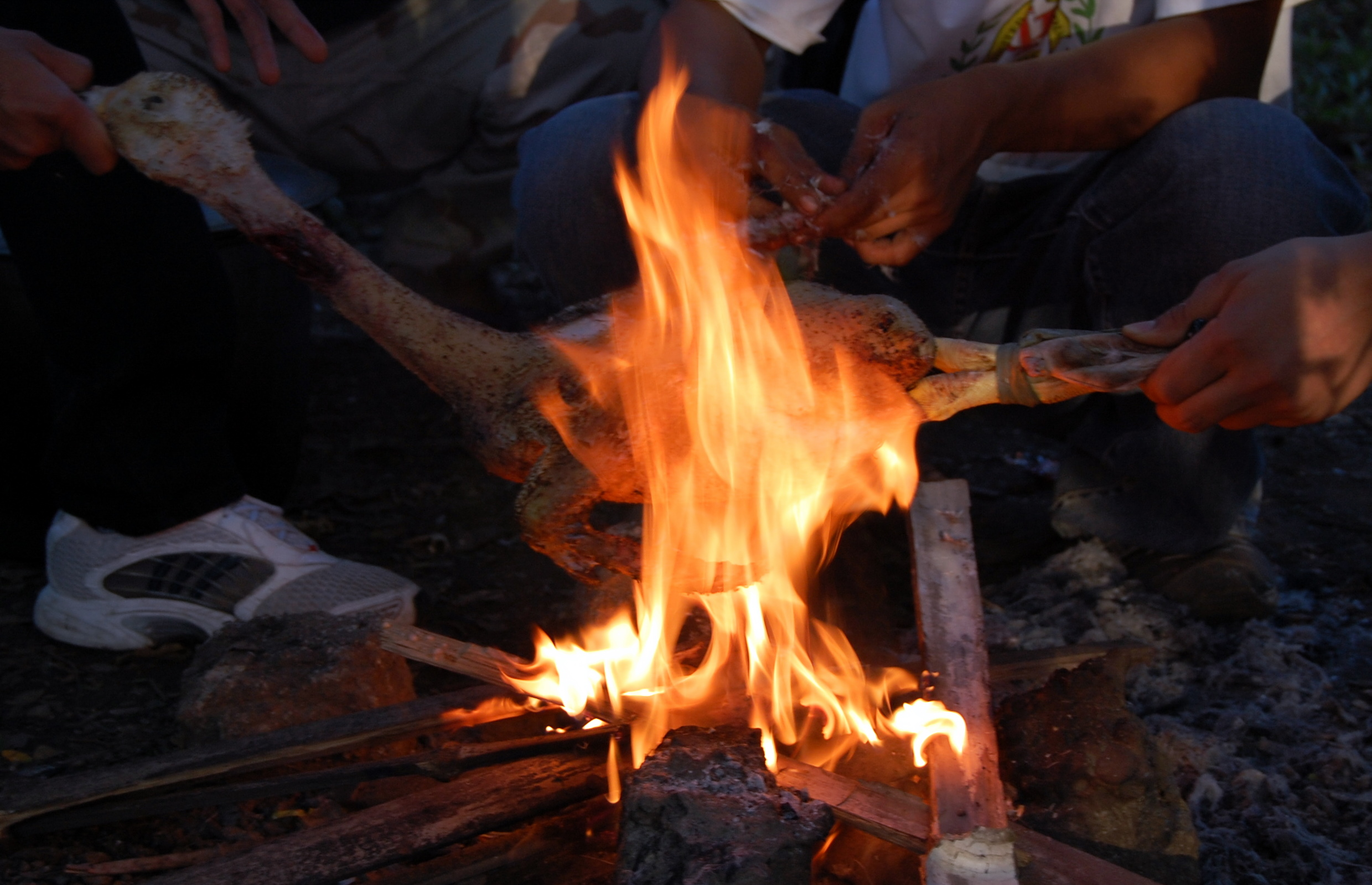
Ihaw, method of grilling or roasting food over an open flame.

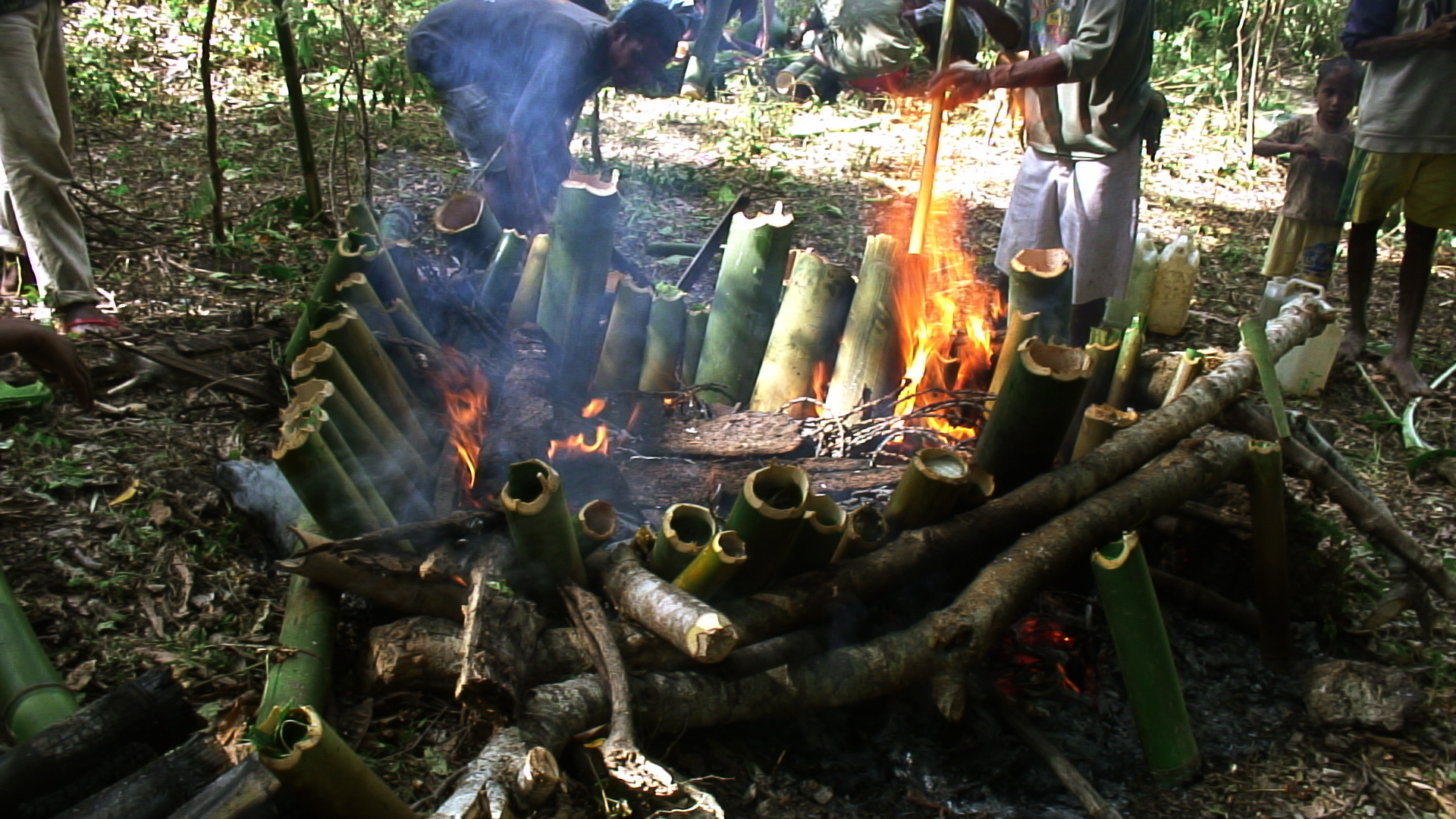
Tinungbo, method of cooking food inside bamboo tubes over an open fire.

- Adobo (inadobo) − cooked in vinegar, oil, garlic and soy sauce.
- Afritada – braised in tomato sauce.
- Babad (binabad, ibinabad) − to marinate.
- Banli (binanlian, pabanli) − to blanch.
- Bagoong (binagoongan, sa bagoong) − fermented or cooked with fermented fish/shrimp paste (bagoong)
- Bibingka – baked cakes, traditionally glutinous rice.
- Binalot – literally "wrapped". This generally refers to dishes wrapped in banana leaves, pandan leaves, or even aluminum foil. The wrapper is generally inedible (in contrast to lumpia—see below).
- Buro (binuro) − fermented, pickled, or preserved in salt or vinegar. Synonymous with tapay in other Philippine languages when referring to fermented rice.
- Daing (dinaing, padaing) − salted and dried, usually fish or seafood. Synonymous with tuyô, bulad or buwad in other Philippine languages
- Giniling – ground meat. Sometimes used as a synonym for picadillo, especially in arroz a la cubana.
- Guinataan (sa gata) − cooked with coconut milk.
- Guisa (guisado, ginuisa) − sautéed with garlic and onions. Also spelled gisa, gisado, ginisa.
- Hamonado (endulsado) – marinated or cooked in a sweet pineapple sauce. Sometimes synonymous with pininyahan or minatamis
- Halabos (hinalabos) – mostly for shellfish. Steamed in their own juices and sometimes carbonated soda.
- Halo-halo - made up of crushed ice, evaporated milk or condensed milk, and various ingredients including, ube, sweetened beans, coconut strips, sago (pearls), gulaman (gelatin), pinipig rice, boiled taro or soft yams in cubes, fruit slices, flan, and topped with a scoop of ube ice cream.
- Hilaw (sariwa) – unripe (for fruits and vegetables), raw (for meats). Also used for uncooked food in general (as in lumpiang sariwa).
- Hinurno – baked in an oven (pugon) or roasted.
- Ihaw (inihaw) − grilled over coal. In Visayas, it is also known as sinugba; inasal refers to grilling meat on sticks.
- Kinilaw or Kilawin − fish or seafood marinated in vinegar or calamansi juice along with garlic, onions, ginger, cucumber, peppers. Also means to eat raw or fresh, cognate of Hilaw.
- Lechon (nilechon) − roasted on a spit. Also spelled litson.
- Lumpia – savory food wrapped with an edible wrapper.
- Minatamis (minatamisan) − sweetened. Similar to hamonado.
- Nilaga (laga, palaga) − boiled/braised.
- Nilasing − cooked with an alcoholic beverage like wine or beer.
- Paksiw (pinaksiw) − cooked in vinegar.
- Pancit (pansit, fideo) – noodle dishes, usually of Chinese Filipino origin.
- Pangat (pinangat) − boiled in salted water/brine with fruit such as tomatoes or ripe mangoes.
- Palaman (pinalaman, pinalamanan) − "filled" as in siopao, though "palaman" also refers to the filling in a sandwich.
- Pinakbet (pakbet) − to cook with vegetables usually with sitaw (yardlong beans), calabaza, talong (eggplant), and ampalaya (bitter melon) among others and bagoong.
- Pinakuluan – boiled.
- Pininyahan – marinated or cooked with pineapples. Sometimes synonymous with hamonado.
- Prito (pinirito) − fried or deep fried. From the Spanish frito.
- Puto – steamed cakes, traditionally glutinous rice.
- Relleno (relyeno) – stuffed.
- Sarza (sarciado) – cooked with a thick sauce.
- Sinangag – garlic fried rice.
- Sisig - is a traditional food of Filipino specially partnered with beer. It made by different parts of pig.
- Sigang (sinigang) − boiled in a sour broth usually with a tamarind base. Other common souring agents include guava, raw mangoes, calamansi also known as calamondin.
- Tapa or Tinapa – dried and smoked. Tapa refers to meat treated in this manner, mostly marinated and then dried and fried afterwards. Tinapa meanwhile is almost exclusively associated with smoked fish.
- Tapay – fermented with yeast, usually rice, traditionally in tapayan jars. Synonymous with buro in early phases. Can also refer to various products of fermented rice, including rice wines. A very briefly fermented glutinous rice version is known as galapong, which is an essential ingredient in Filipino kakanin (rice cakes). Cognate of tinapay (leavened bread).
- Tosta (tinosta, tostado) – toasted.
- Torta (tinorta, patorta) – in the northern Philippines, to cook with eggs in the manner of an omelette. In the southern Philippines, a general term for a small cake.

== Foreign influences ==
=== American influences ===
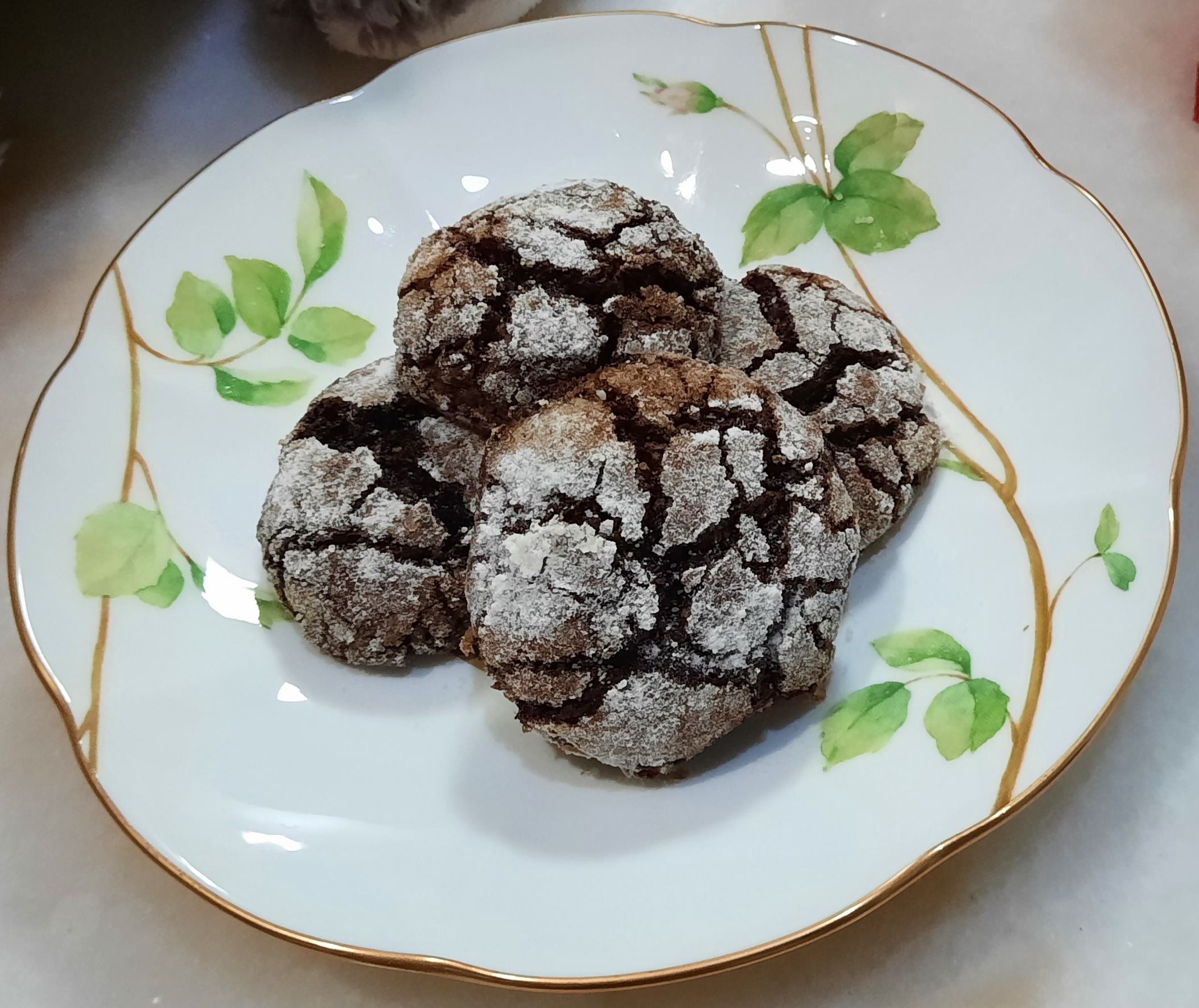
A chocolate crinkle which is originated in Minnesota but is more popular in the Philippines.

=== Indian influences ===
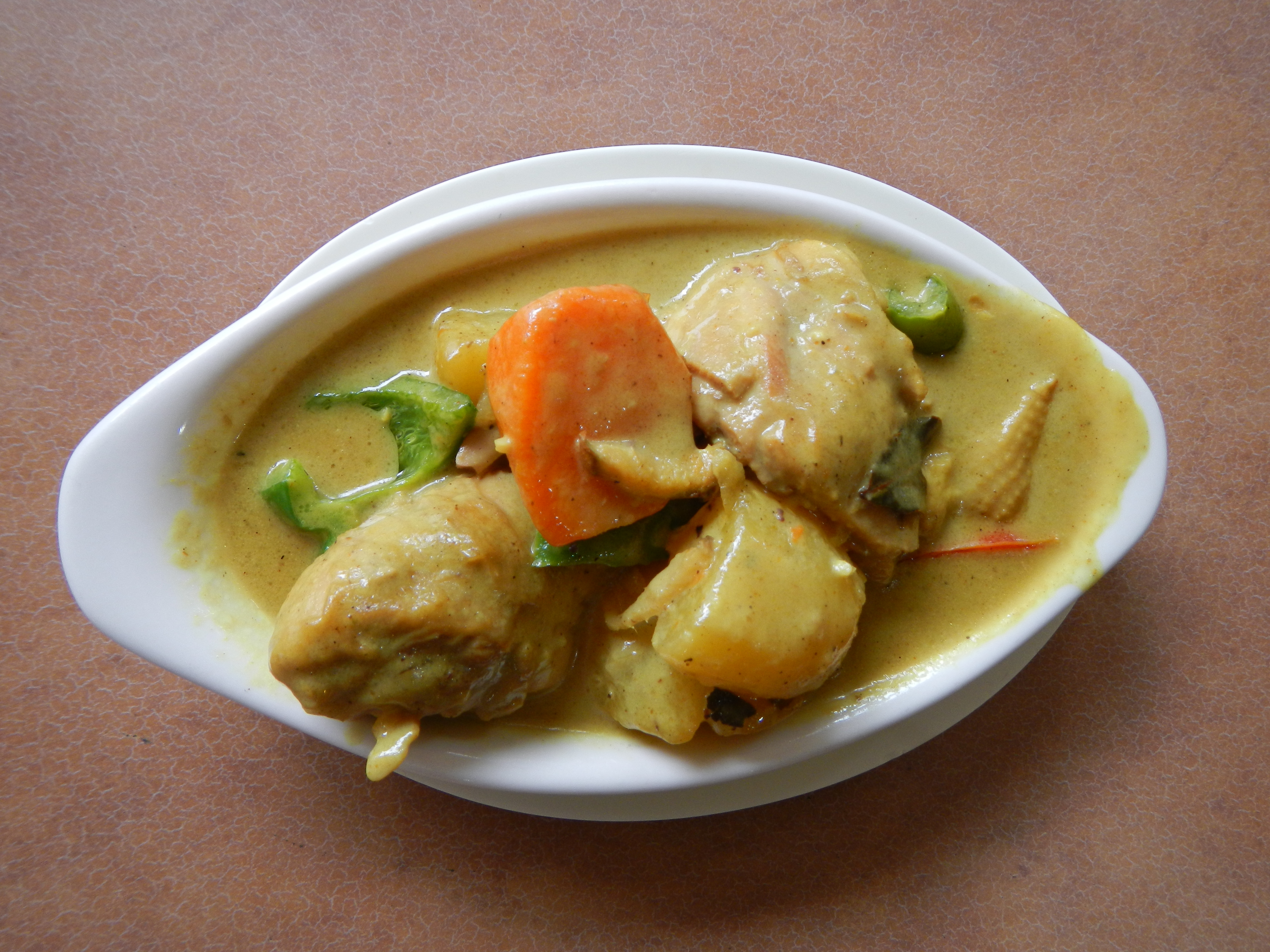
Filipino chicken curry, a variant of the native ginataang manok with curry powder

Indian influences can also be noted in rice-based delicacies such as bibingka (analogous to the Indonesian bingka), puto, and puto bumbong, where the latter two are plausibly derived from the south Indian puttu, which also has variants throughout Maritime Southeast Asia (e.g. kue putu, putu mangkok). The kare-kare, more popular in Luzon, on the other hand could trace its origins from the Seven Years' War when the British occupied Manila from 1762 to 1764 with a force that included Indian sepoys, who had to improvise Indian dishes given the lack of spices in the Philippines to make curry. This is said to explain the name and its supposed thick, yellow-to-orange annatto and peanut-based sauce, which alludes to a type of curry.

Atchara originated from the Indian achar, which was transmitted via the acar of the Indonesia, Malaysia, and Brunei.

=== Japanese influences ===
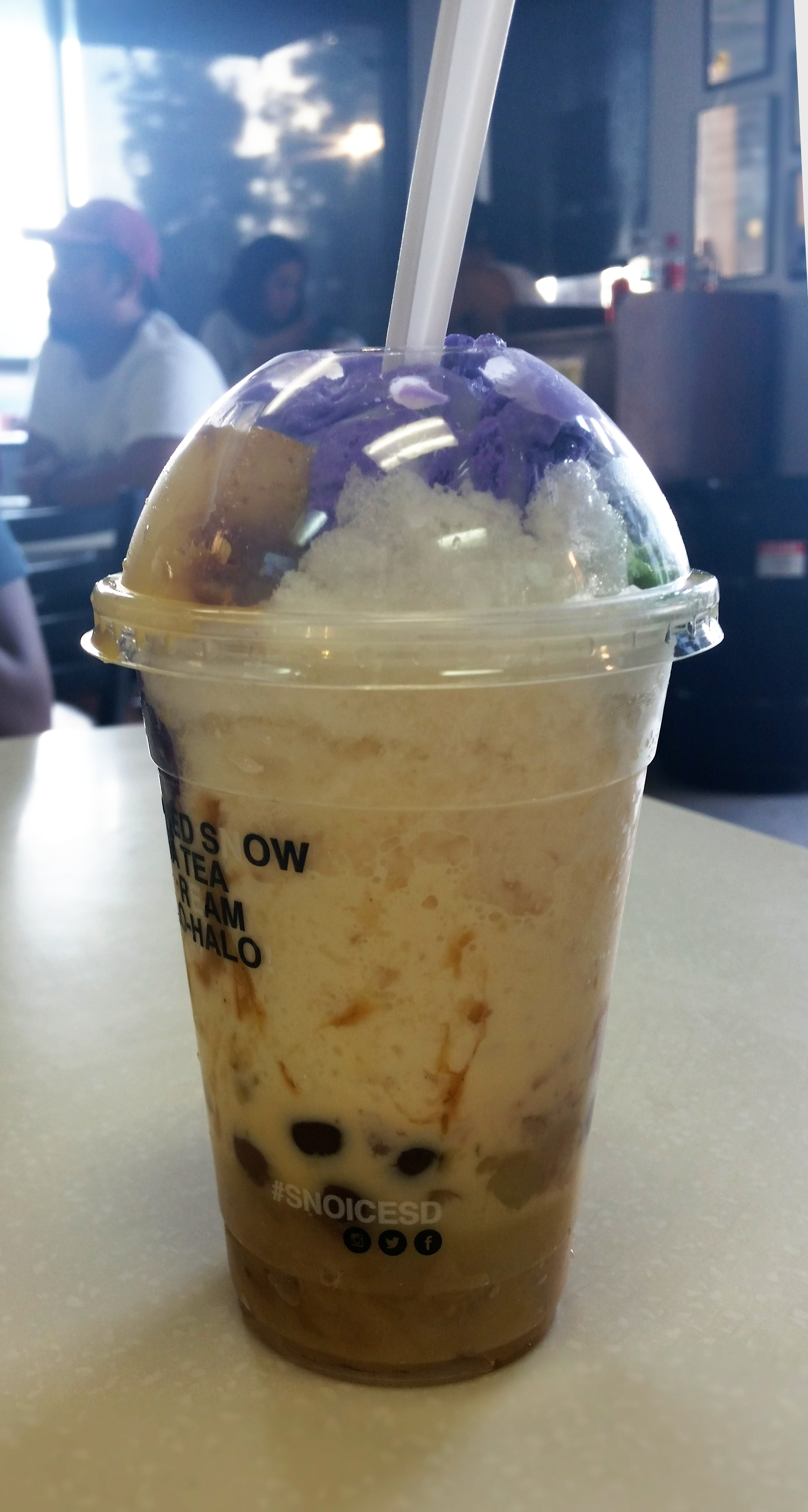
Halo-halo made in San Diego County, California

Some authors specifically attribute halo-halo to the 1920s or 1930s Japanese migrants in the Quinta Market of Quiapo, Manila, due to its proximity to the Insular Ice Plant, which was Quiapo's main ice supply.

One of the earliest versions of halo-halo was a dessert known locally as mongo-ya in Japanese which consisted of only mung beans (Tagalog: monggo or munggo, used in place of red azuki beans from Japan), boiled and cooked in syrup (minatamis na monggo), served on top of crushed ice with milk and sugar. Over time, more native ingredients were added, resulting in the creation and development of the modern halo-halo. One difference between halo-halo and its Japanese ancestor is the placement of ingredients mostly under the ice instead of on top of it. The original monggo con hielo type can still be found today along with similar variations using sweet corn (maiz con hielo) or saba bananas (saba con hielo).

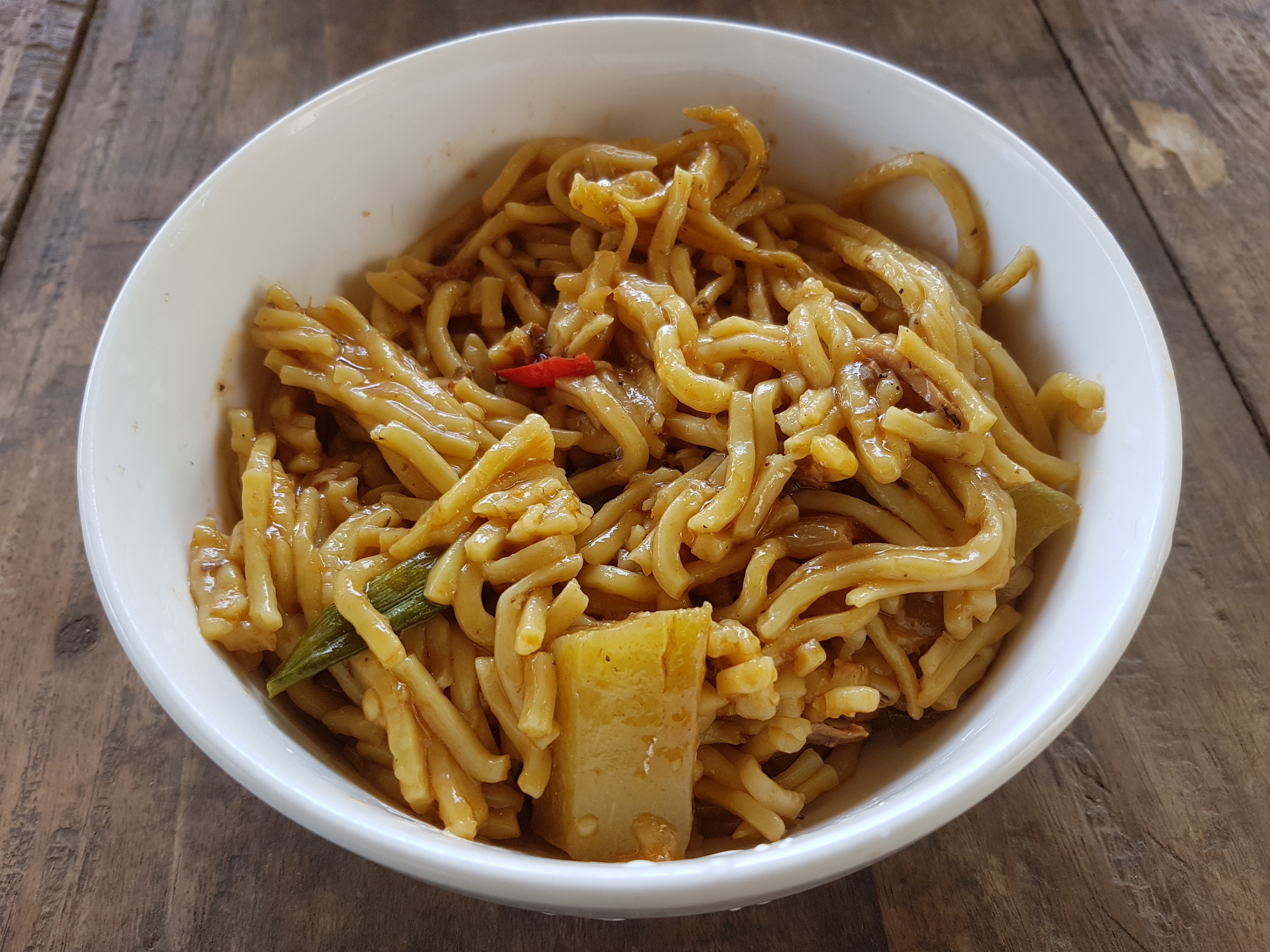
Odong with sardines

The name of odong, a Visayan noodle soup, is derived from the Japanese udon noodles, although it does not use udon noodles or bear any resemblance to udon dishes. It originates from the Davao Region of Mindanao and the Visayas Islands which had a large Japanese migrant community in the early 1900s. The odong noodles were previously locally manufactured by Okinawans, but modern odong noodles (which are distinctly yellowish) are imported from China.

=== Mexican influences ===
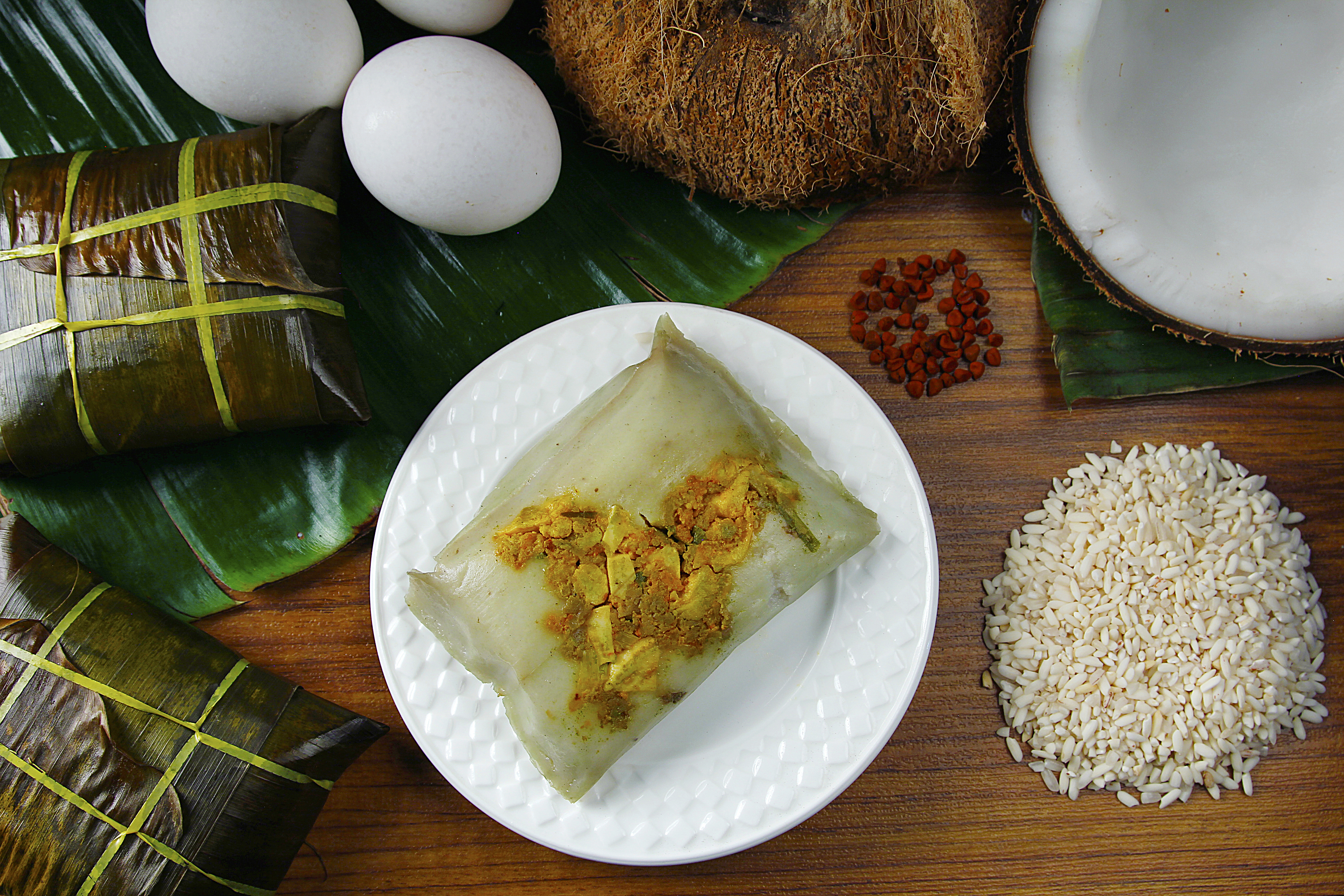
Bobotu, a Kapampangan tamales made from ground rice often steamed or wrapped in banana leaves.

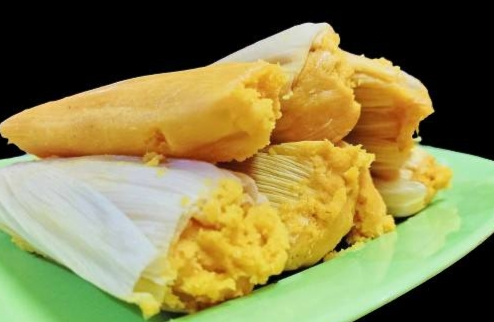
Binaki, a steamed corn cake wrapped in corn husks, popular in Bukidnon.

Mexican influence in Filipino cuisine comes mainly from the Manila-Acapulco Galleon Trade, which connected the Philippines and Mexico for over 250 years. This introduced crops from the Americas, such as cacao, corn, pineapple, papaya, avocado, and other fruits, many of which became part of local diets.

Mexican culinary influence is also evident in Filipino tamales, which differ from their Mexican counterparts by using rice or glutinous rice instead of corn and banana leaves instead of corn husks. Regional variations include bobotu, boboto or suman tamales from Pampanga, made with ground rice, coconut milk, and toppings such as chicken, ham, peanuts, or eggs; tamalos from Samar, consisting of braised pork wrapped in rice dough and served with peanut sauce; and tamalis from Sariaya, shaped into squares and topped with meat and boiled eggs. Other versions are found in Bulacan and Batangas, particularly in Ibaan and Lipa which is suman sa lihiya. A related dish is binaki, also called pintos, made from grated corn with coconut milk and sugar, wrapped in corn husks, and commonly prepared in Northern Mindanao and Cebu.

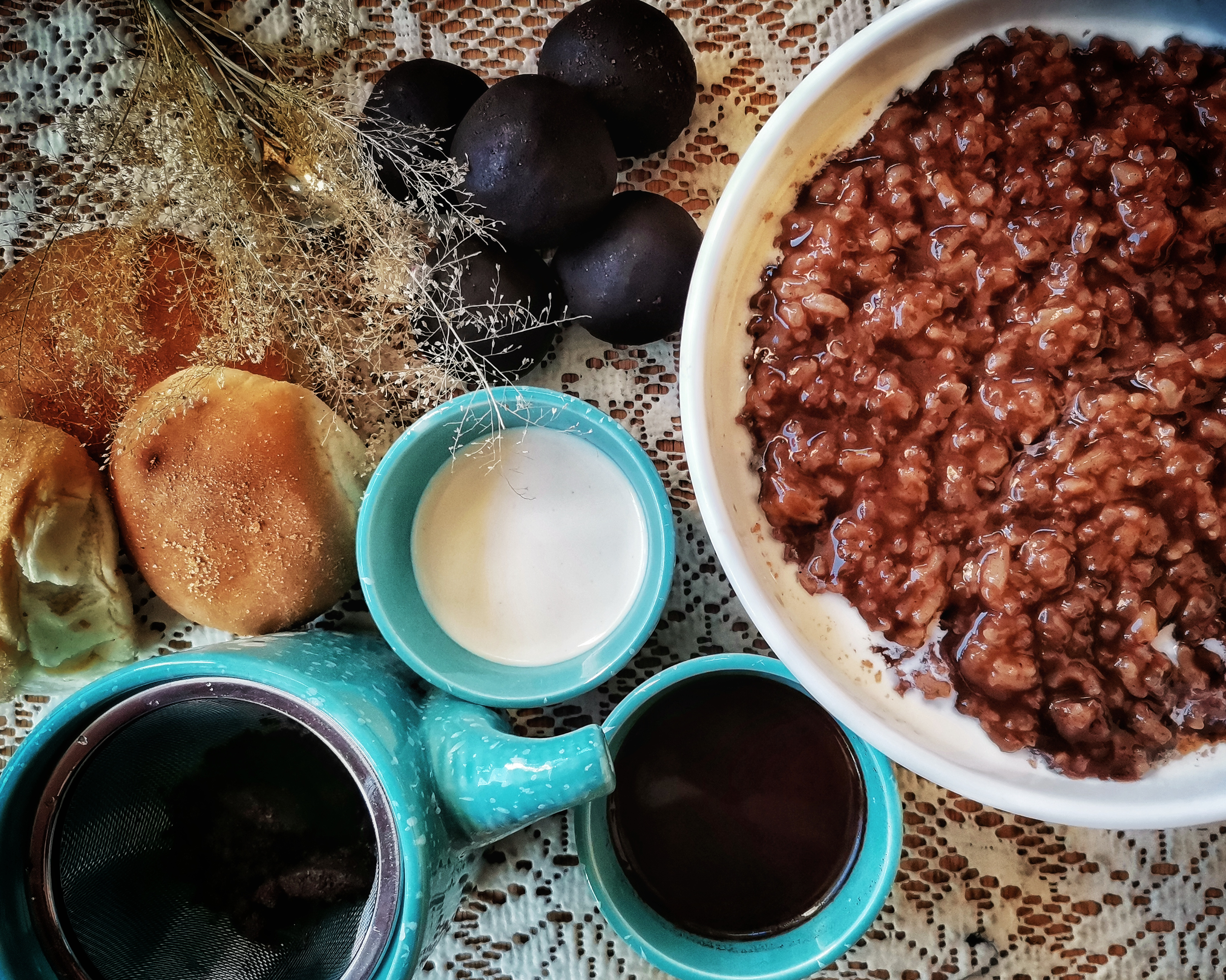
Champorado a chocolate rice porridge with hot sikwate.

Chocolate-based dishes also reflect this influence. Champorado is a sweet chocolate rice porridge made from cacao tablets (tablea), similar to the Mexican champurrado. Sikwate is a Filipino hot chocolate drink, while batirol refers to both the traditional preparation and the wooden whisk used to make a frothy chocolate beverage from tablea.

=== Arab influences ===
The Arab influence on Filipino cuisine is relatively minor. Historically, Arab influence arrived via India to Indonesia and the Philippines. In the earlier days, Arabs traded with Indians, who in turn traded with Southeast Asia. In the later era, with advancement of sea navigation, Arabs also started to trade directly with the Philippines.

=== Indonesian influences ===
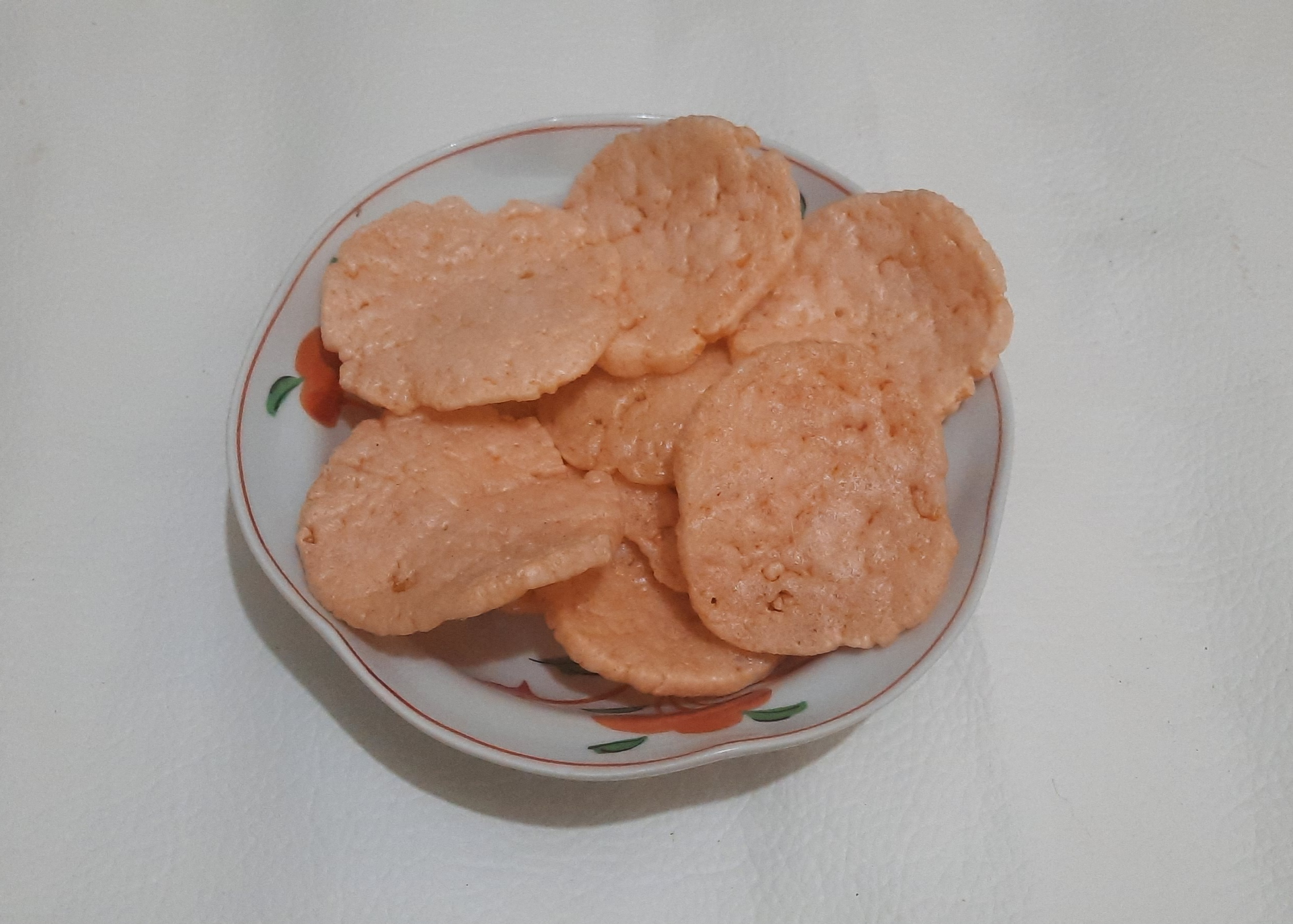
Kropek in Nagcarlan

Several foods in the Philippines have a close relation with foods originating from some regions in Indonesia, such as kropek which is derived from krupuk. Furthermore, in the southern part of the Philippines, there is rendang made by the Muslim Maranao people of Mindanao and satti, a specialty food in Zamboanga that still has close ties to satay, which originates from Java.

== Outside the Philippines ==
=== United States ===
Filipino-American cuisine was first brought over to and developed in the United States by Filipino immigrants in the early twentieth century, creating a distinct style of culinary traditions that were adapted to both the local availability of ingredients as well as American tastes.

Many Filipino-owned restaurants and catering services can be found in various Filipino communities, also known as "Little Manilas", located all throughout the United States, primarily concentrated within densely populated cities like Los Angeles and New York City. Many family-owned and chef-owned restaurants in these communities introduced many staple dishes found in the Philippines to the United States, such as inihaw na liempo, lumpiang shanghai, adobo and kare-kare.

Some modern Filipino-American restaurants have taken these traditional dishes and further adapted them for American tastes through variations in ingredients, preparation, and presentation with restaurants like Bad Saint in Washington D.C., Maharlika in New York, and Lasa in Los Angeles gaining mass popularity and praise for their speciality dishes. Cendrillion, opened in 1995 by Amy Besa and Romy Dorotan in New York, is seen as one of the first breakthrough Filipino-American restaurants that popularized Filipino cuisine with innovative, novel meals such as an adobo made with rabbit and quail or a crème brûlée flavored with ginger and lemongrass. In 2022, Chicago restaurant Kasama became the world's first Filipino restaurant to be awarded a Michelin star.

Tom Cunanan, a James Beard award-winning Filipino-American chef and founder of Bad Saint, also opened a restaurant named Pogiboy that further combines American and Filipino cuisine by serving dishes such as sinigang-flavored fried chicken and longganisa and tocino-filled hamburgers. Another restaurant, Ox+Tiger, located in the San Francisco area, serves an innovative combination of Japanese and Filipino food through its brick-and-mortar restaurant. By combining traditional Filipino ingredients and flavor profiles with Japanese dishes,Chefs EJ Macayan and Hitomi Wada Evan Kidera, hopes to better introduce Filipino cuisine to the United States by fusing it with a more familiar cuisine to better suit American palates. Some of these Filipino-American restaurants such as Barkada, Jeepney, Pogiboy and Maharlika have also introduced the kamayan feast to American diners, a traditional way of eating a variety of Filipino dishes served communal-style using ones hands.

Popular Filipino restaurant chains such as Jollibee have also established themselves in the United States, subsequently developing a rapidly-growing fanbase and social media presence. Jollibee, a Filipino fast-food chain well known for their American-influenced food items such as fried chicken and hamburgers, currently has sixty-four franchises in the country with plans to open one hundred and fifty stores within the next five years. The chain also serves Filipino dishes like pancit palabok, halo-halo, and an American-inspired peach-mango pie. Other restaurant chains such as Chowking, a Filipino-Chinese inspired fast-food chain, and Red Ribbon, a bakery serving Filipino desserts and baked goods have also opened up a smaller amount of various locations within the United States.

Ube, a purple yam traditionally used in many Filipino foods and desserts, has also seen a surge in popularity in the United States as a cooking ingredient in recent years. Traditionally served in desserts such as ube halaya or halo-halo, it can be seen served in a variety of American restaurants and foods (typically desserts) including waffles, coffee cakes, cupcakes, and in doughnuts as well. Ube has also seen popularity as a flavor of beer in American breweries in the states of California and Hawaii. Trader Joe's, an American grocery store chain, also sells ube-flavored ice cream, pancake mix, and shortbread cookies.

== International awards and recognition ==
The MICHELIN Guide made its debut in the Philippines, awarding one 2-star and eight 1-star restaurants in Manila and Cebu. This marks a milestone for Philippine gastronomy's international recognition.

== See also ==
- List of Philippine desserts
- Japanese cuisine
- Indian cuisine
- List of Philippine dishes
- List of restaurant chains in the Philippines
- Philippine condiments
- Indonesian cuisine
- Thai cuisine
