= Geera pork =

Pork stew popular in Trinidad and Tobago

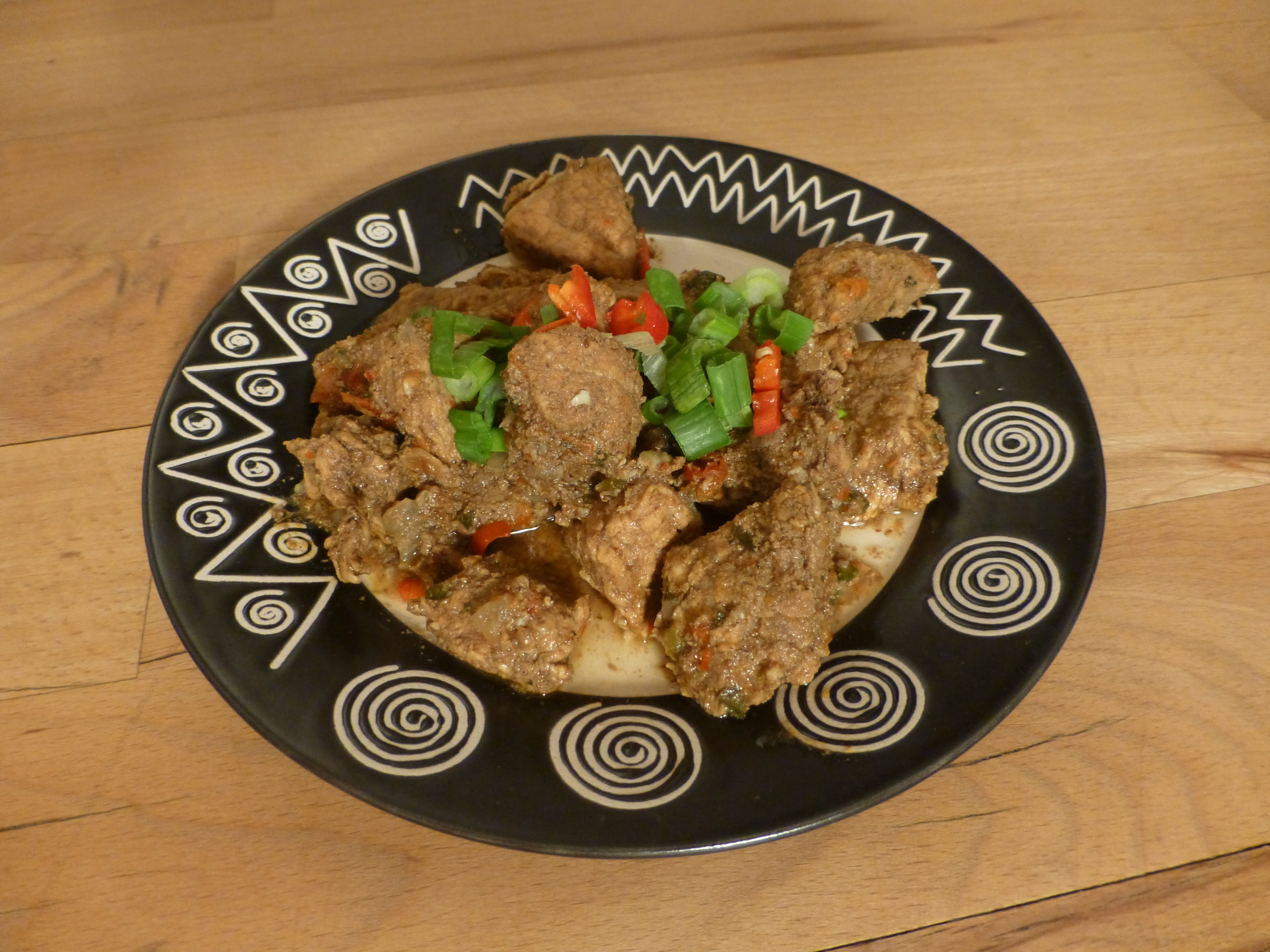
Geera pork

Geera pork is a Trinidadian pork dish. It is a style of pork cooked with roasted and ground cumin seeds, garam masala, and pepper. The pork is cut into small pieces and seasoned with salt, hot peppers, chives, onions, garlic, black pepper, pimentos, and culantro. The pork is then left to marinate (preferably overnight). The seasoned meat is fried for a few minutes. Water is then added to the pot and the pork is allowed to cook. It is cooked until all the water has dried out, leaving the pork and a bit of oil.

Geera pork is commonly served in bars as finger food or 'cutters'.

== See also ==
- List of pork dishes
