= Vinyali =

Indian dish

Vinyali is a dish of pork and spices with influences from Kerala in Southern India and Malayalees in Malaysia. It is generally spicy, as much chili and ginger is used. Other ingredients include mustard seeds and rice vinegar.

Sometimes confused with a vindaloo.

== See also ==
- List of pork dishes
