= List of pork dishes =

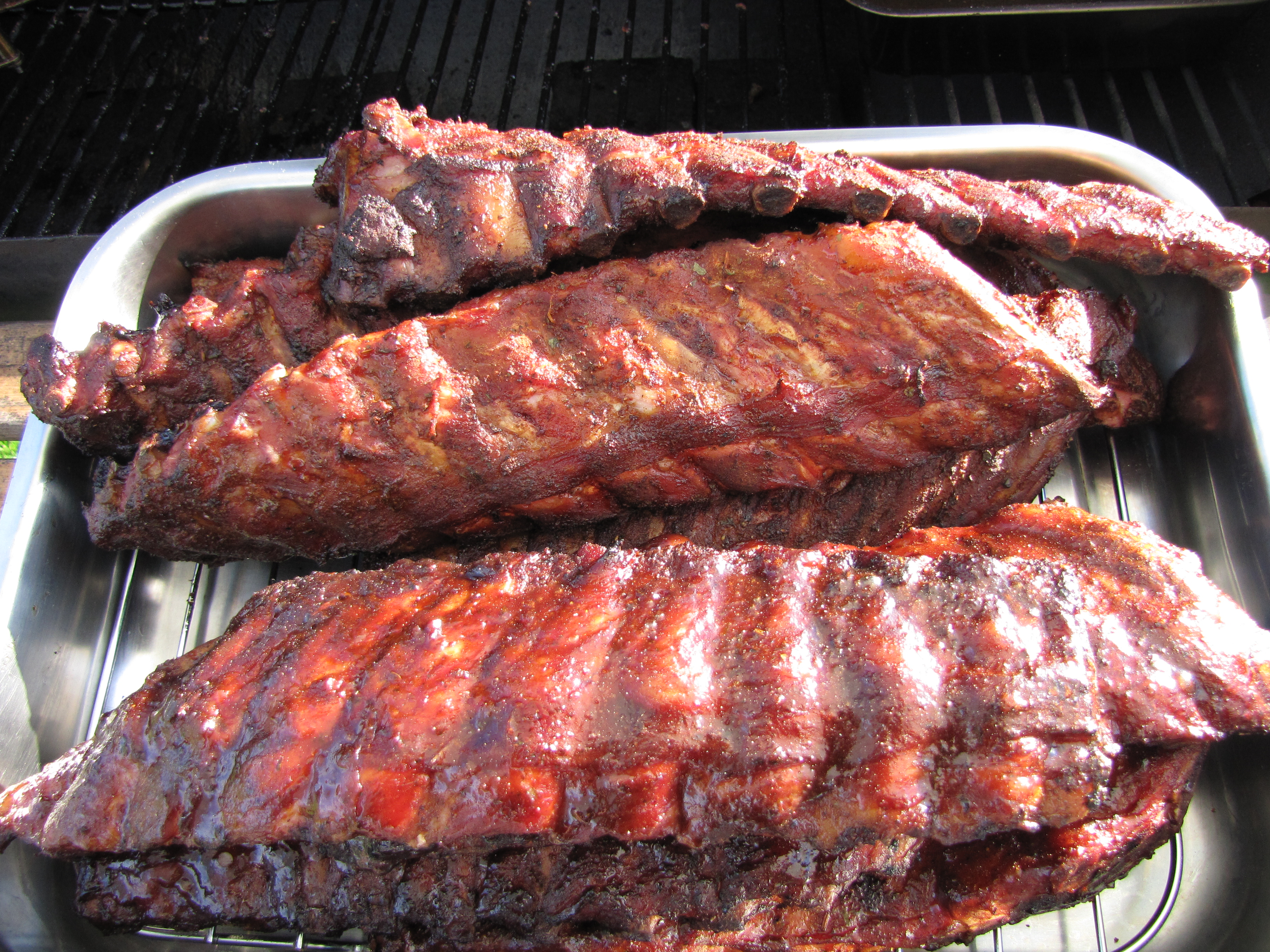
Roasted baby back pork ribs

This is a list of notable pork dishes. Pork is the culinary name for meat from the domestic pig (Sus domesticus). It is one of the most commonly consumed meats worldwide, with evidence of pig husbandry dating back to 5000 BC. Pork is eaten both freshly cooked and preserved.

The consumption of pork is prohibited in Judaism, Islam, and some Christian denominations such as Seventh-day Adventism.

In the United States, the U.S. Department of Agriculture recommends cooking ground pork that is obtained from pig carcasses to an internal temperature of 160 °F, followed by a three-minute rest, and cooking whole cuts to a minimum internal temperature of 145 °F, also followed by a three-minute rest.

== Pork dishes ==
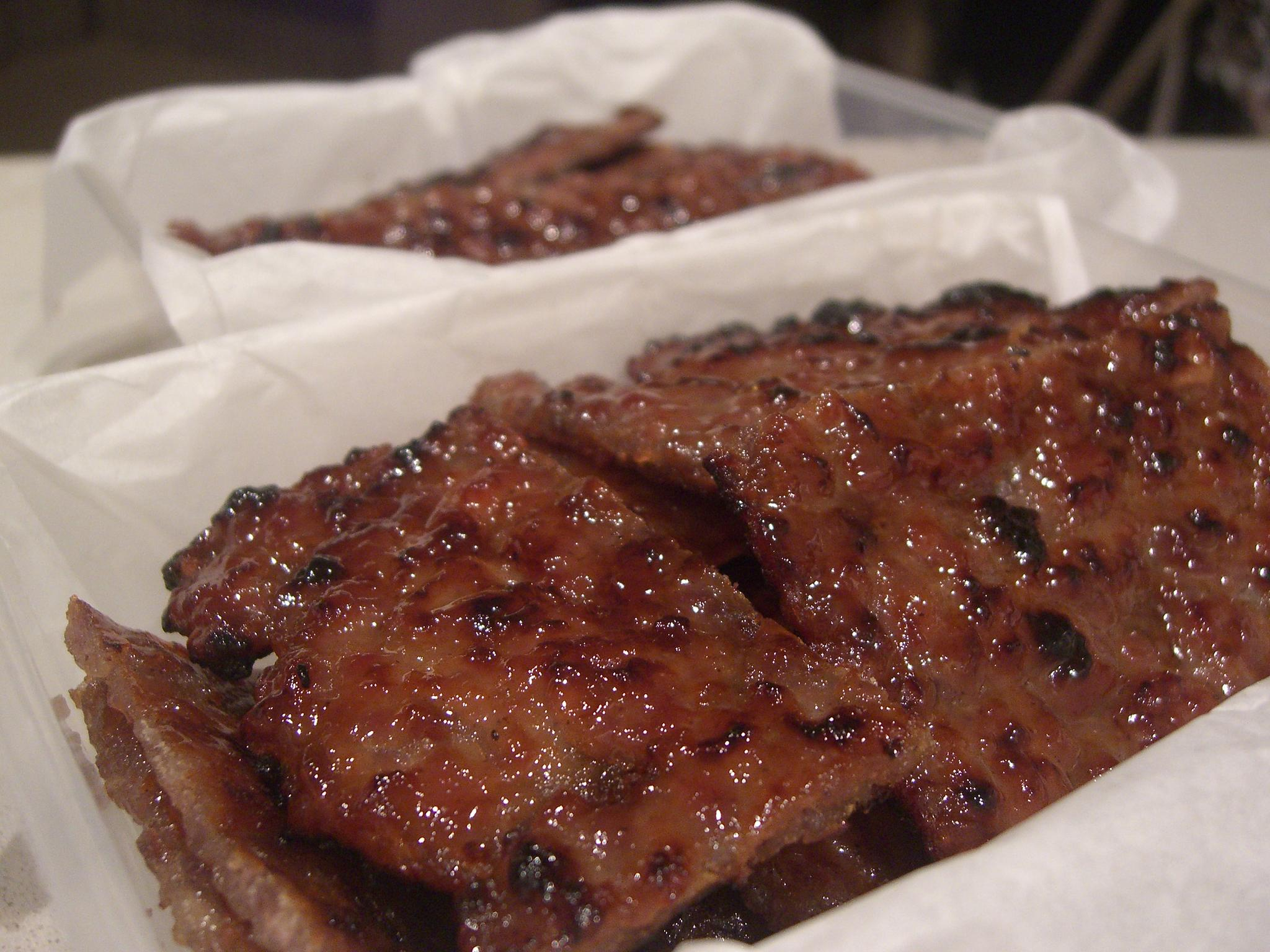
Pork bakkwa, made with a meat preservation and preparation technique originating from ancient China

=== A ===
- Adobong baboy – Filipino dish of meat cooked in soy sauce and vinegar
- Afelia – Cypriot pork dish
- Amatriciana sauce – Italian pasta sauce
- Asado de carajay – Filipino meat dish

=== B ===
- Bai sach chrouk – Cambodian pork and rice dish
- Bakkwa – Salty-sweet dried meat product (can also be made with beef or lamb)
- Bicol express – Filipino stew with chili peppers
- Binagoongan – Filipino cooking process
- Bondiola – Argentinian sandwich with pork shoulder
- Bopis – Filipino dish
- Braised pork rice – Traditional Taiwanese pork dish
- Butadon – Japanese dish
- Butajiru – Japanese pork and miso soup

=== C ===
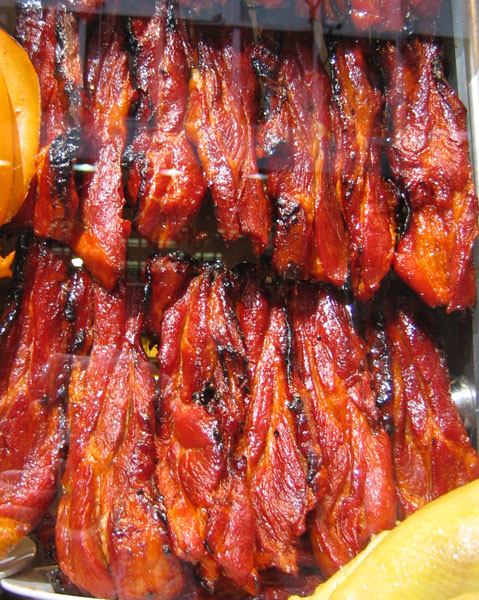
Char siu is a frequently used way to flavor and prepare barbecued pork in Cantonese cuisine.

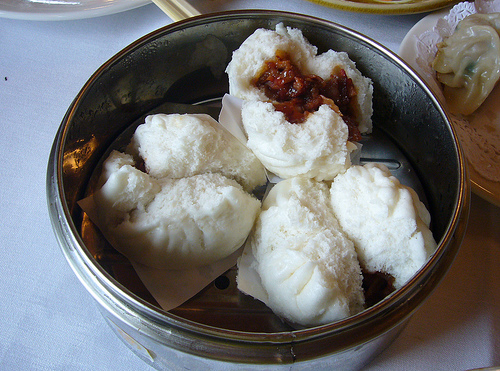
Cha siu bao – a Cantonese barbecue-pork-filled bun (baozi)

- Cao lầu – Vietnamese noodle dish
- Carne de chango – Mexican pork dish
- Carne de porco à alentejana – Portuguese pork dish
- Carne de vinha d'alhos – Portuguese dish of meat marinated with garlic and wine
- Carnitas – Mexican dish
- Cassoeula – Italian pork dish
- Chả giò – Vietnamese spring roll
- Chả lụa – Vietnamese sausage
- Cha siu bao – Cantonese barbecue-pork-filled bun
- Chanpurū – Okinawan stir fry dish
- Char siu – Cantonese style of barbecued pork
- Chicharrón – Pork dish of Spanish origin
- Chim chum – Southeast Asian street food
- Chori burger – Filipino hamburger made with chorizo patties
- Chorizo – Pork sausage originating from the Iberian Peninsula
- Ciccioli – Italian pork dish
- Cochinita pibil – Mexican slow-roasted pork dish
- Cochonnaille – Pork product
- Cơm tấm – Vietnamese rice dish
- Cotechino Modena – Type of Italian sausage
- Crackling bread – Bread flavored with cracklings
- Crispy pata – Filipino dish
- Crubeens – Irish dish made of boiled pigs' feet
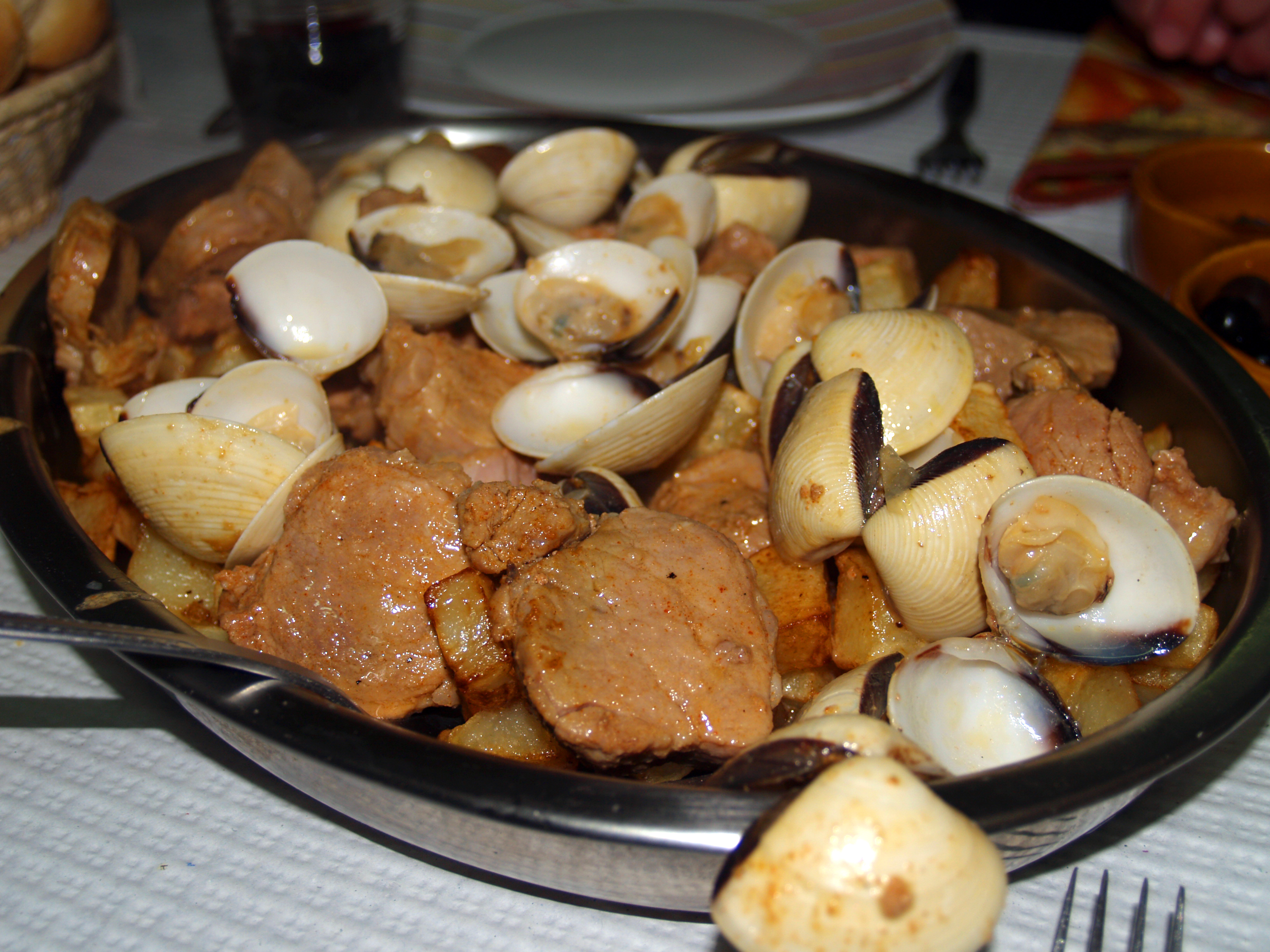
The main ingredients in carne de porco à alentejana are pork, clams and potatoes.

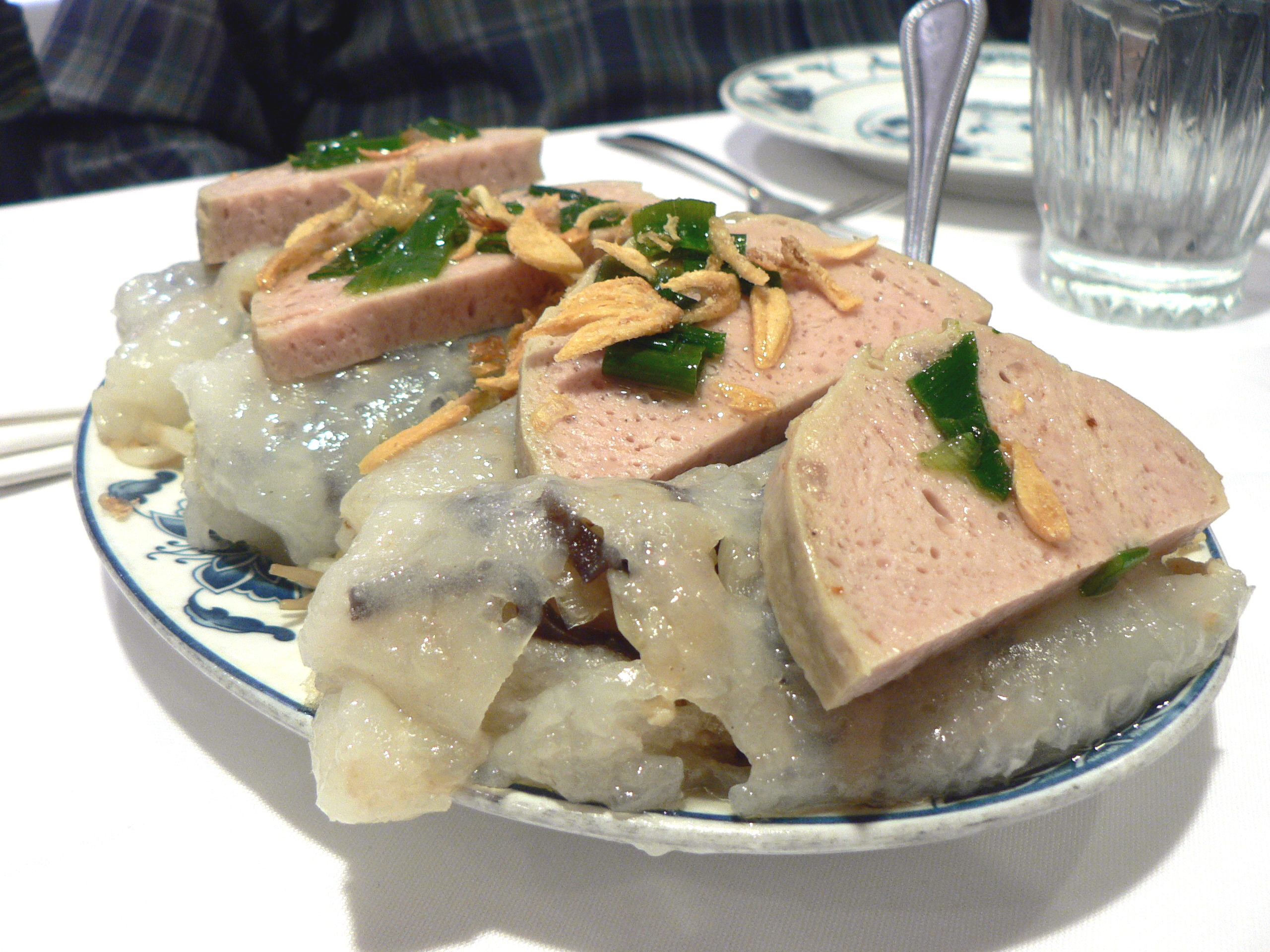
Sliced chả lụa served over bánh cuốn and garnished with fried shallots

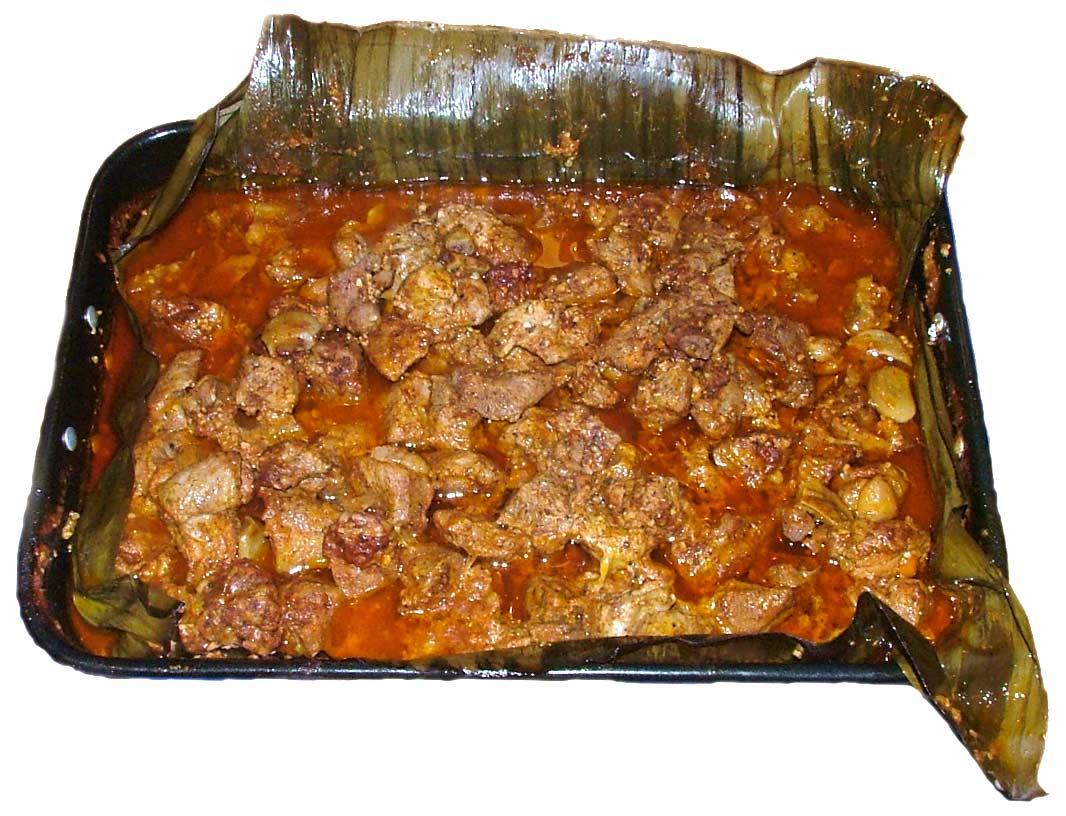
Cochinita pibil is a traditional Mexican slow-roasted pork dish from the Yucatán Península of Mayan origin that involves marinating the meat in acidic citrus juice.

=== D ===
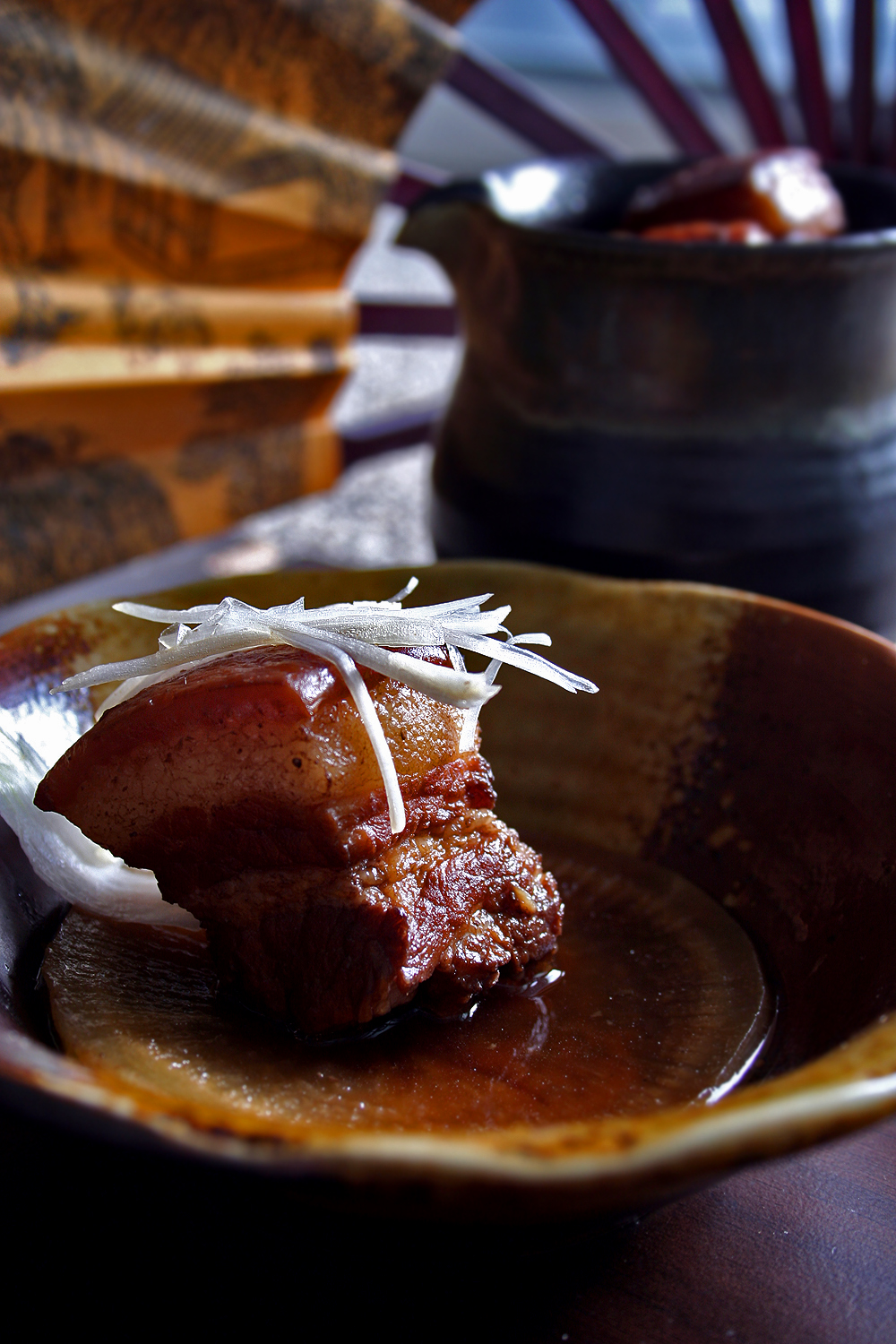
Dongpo pork is a Hangzhou dish made by pan-frying and then red cooking pork belly.

- Dinakdakan – Filipino dish of boiled and grilled pork parts
- Dinuguan – Filipino savory stew
- Dongpo pork – Chinese fried braised pork dish

=== E ===
- Eisbein – Corned ham hock
- Embutido – Filipino meatloaf
- Espetada – Technique of cooking food on skewers
- Everlasting – Filipino steamed meatloaf

=== F ===
- Fabada asturiana – Asturian bean stew
- Farinheira – Portuguese smoked sausage
- Fidget pie – Cured pork and apple pie
- Flæskesteg – Danish roast pork
- Frankfurter Rippchen – German meat and potato dish
- Fried brain sandwich - Fried piglet’s brain sandwich
- Fricasé – Bolivian soup dish
- Fritada – Traditional Ecuadorian dish
- Full breakfast – Breakfast served in Great Britain and Ireland
- Fun guo – Chinese steamed dumplings
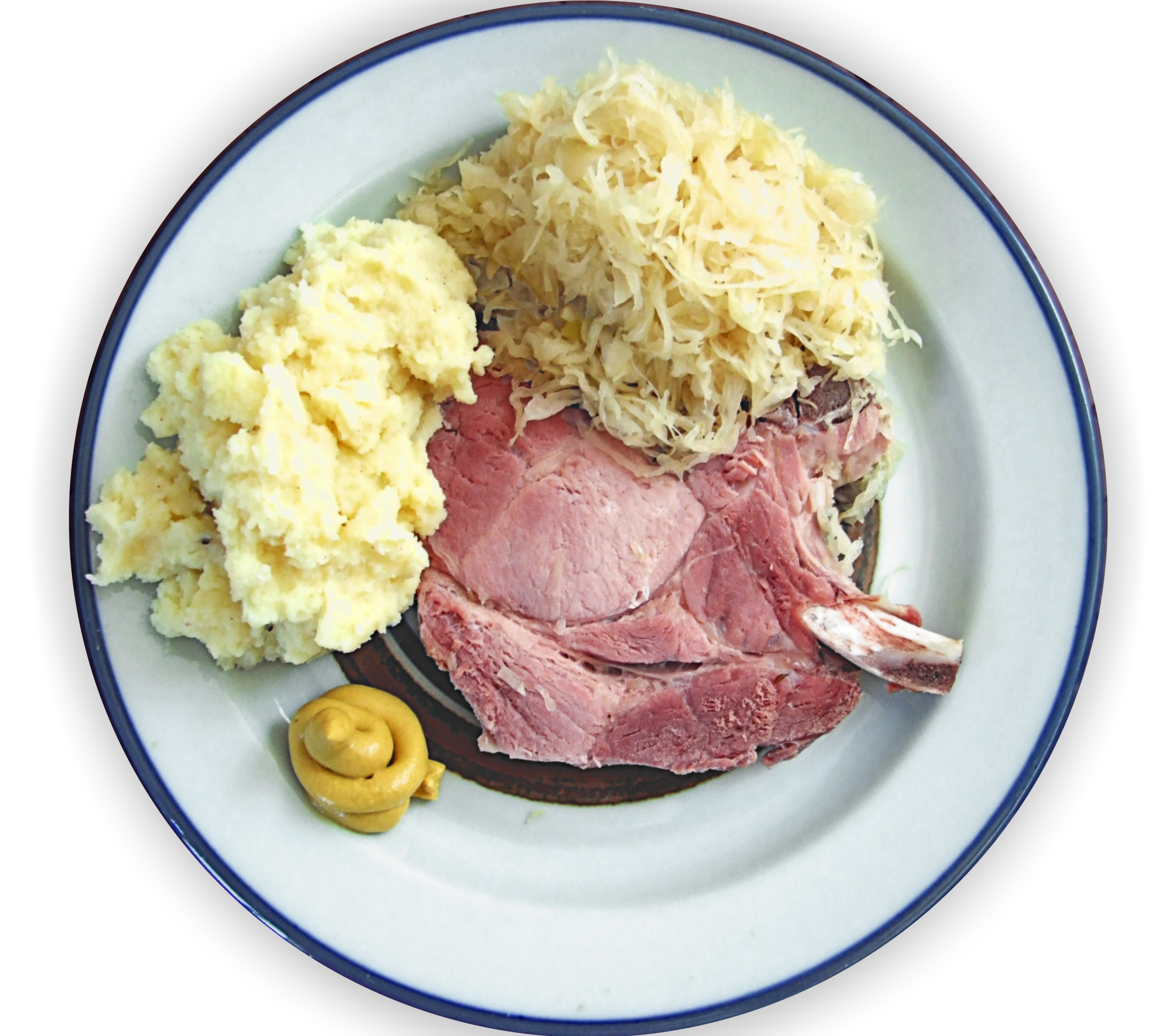
Frankfurter Rippchen

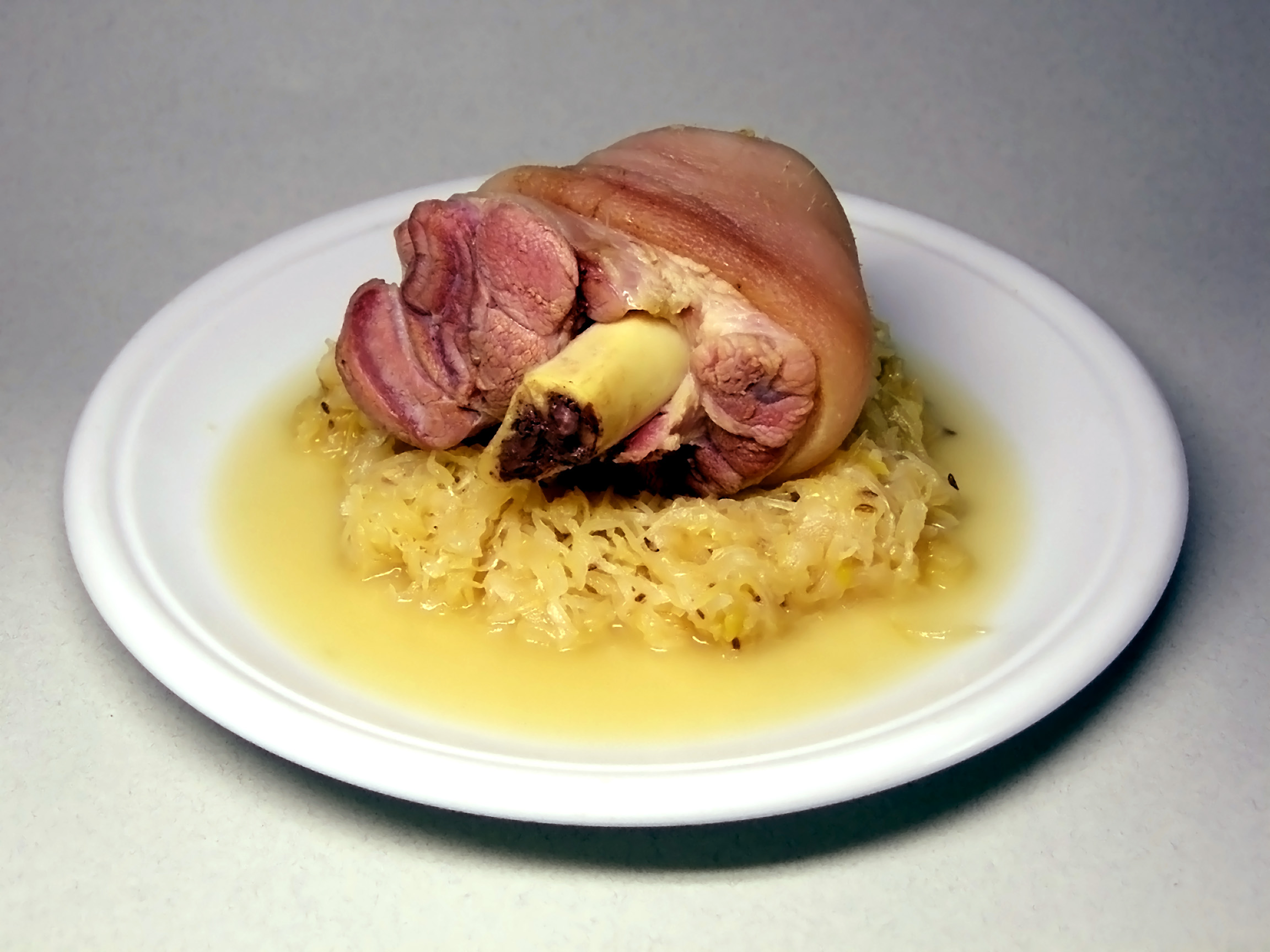
Pickled eisbein (pickled ham hock), served with sauerkraut. In parts of Germany it is known as schweinshaxe.

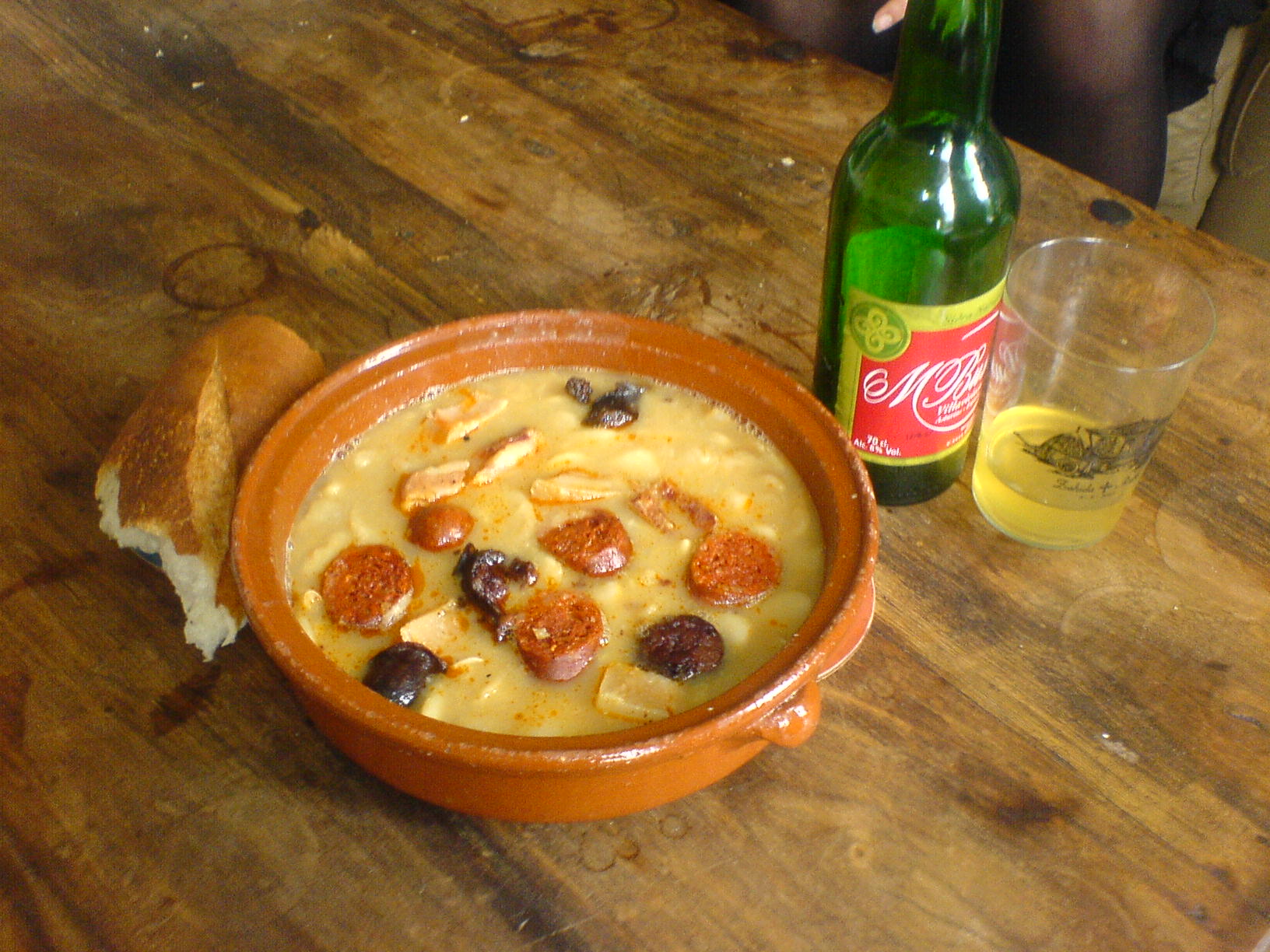
Fabada asturiana, a rich Spanish bean stew, as typically served with crusty bread and Asturian cider

=== G ===
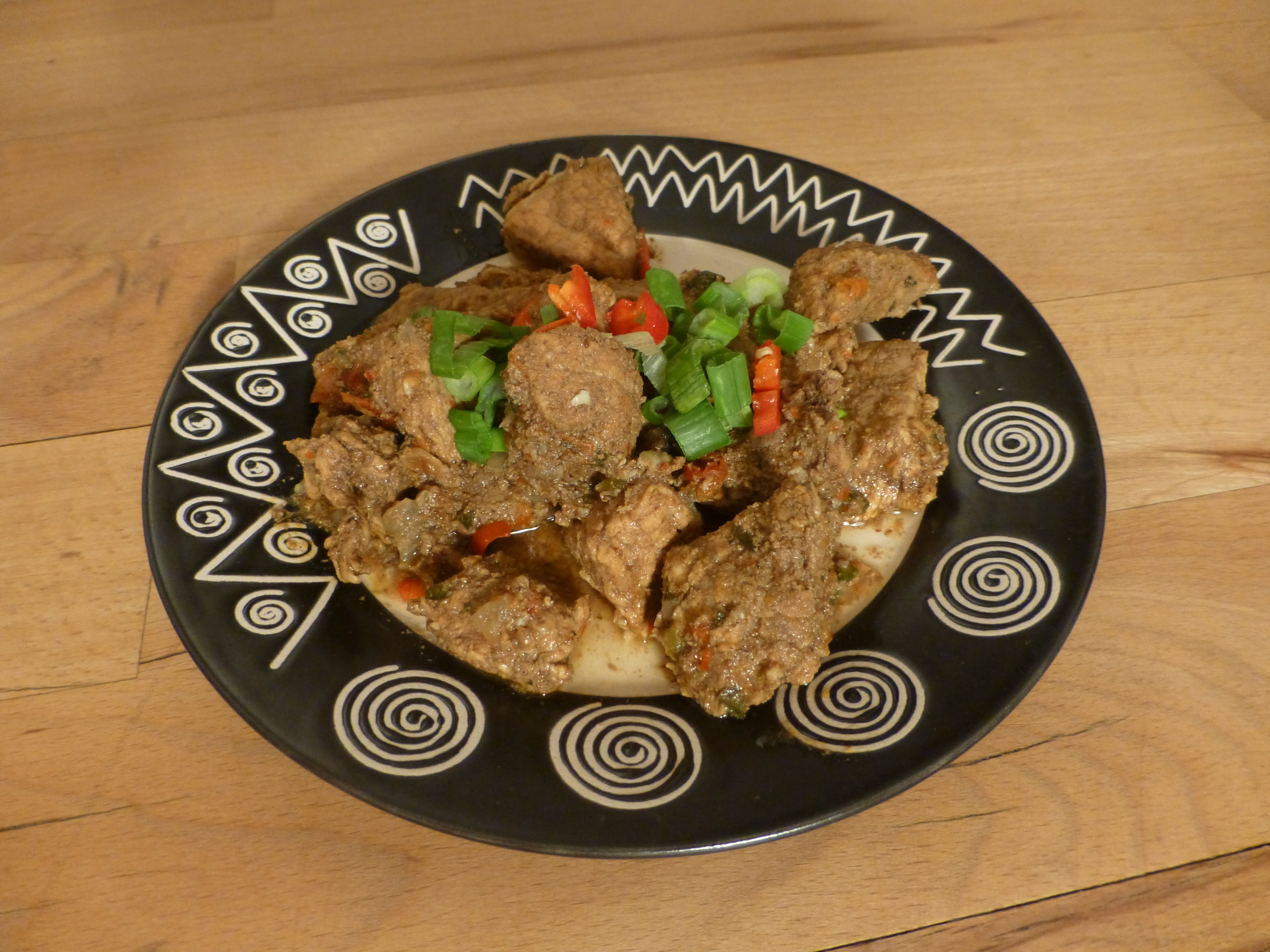
Geera pork

- Galbi – Korean grilled beef or pork ribs
- Geera pork
- Goetta – US pork and oats dish
- Griot (food) – Dish in Haitian cuisine

=== H ===
- Ham and egg bun – Hong Kong pastry
- Ham sandwich – Common type of sandwich
- Ham – Pork from a leg cut that has been preserved by wet or dry curing
- Hamonado – Filipino Christmas dish

=== I ===
- Inihaw na liempo – Barbecue dishes from the Philippines
- Iron range porketta- roasted pork dish from Minnesota

=== J ===
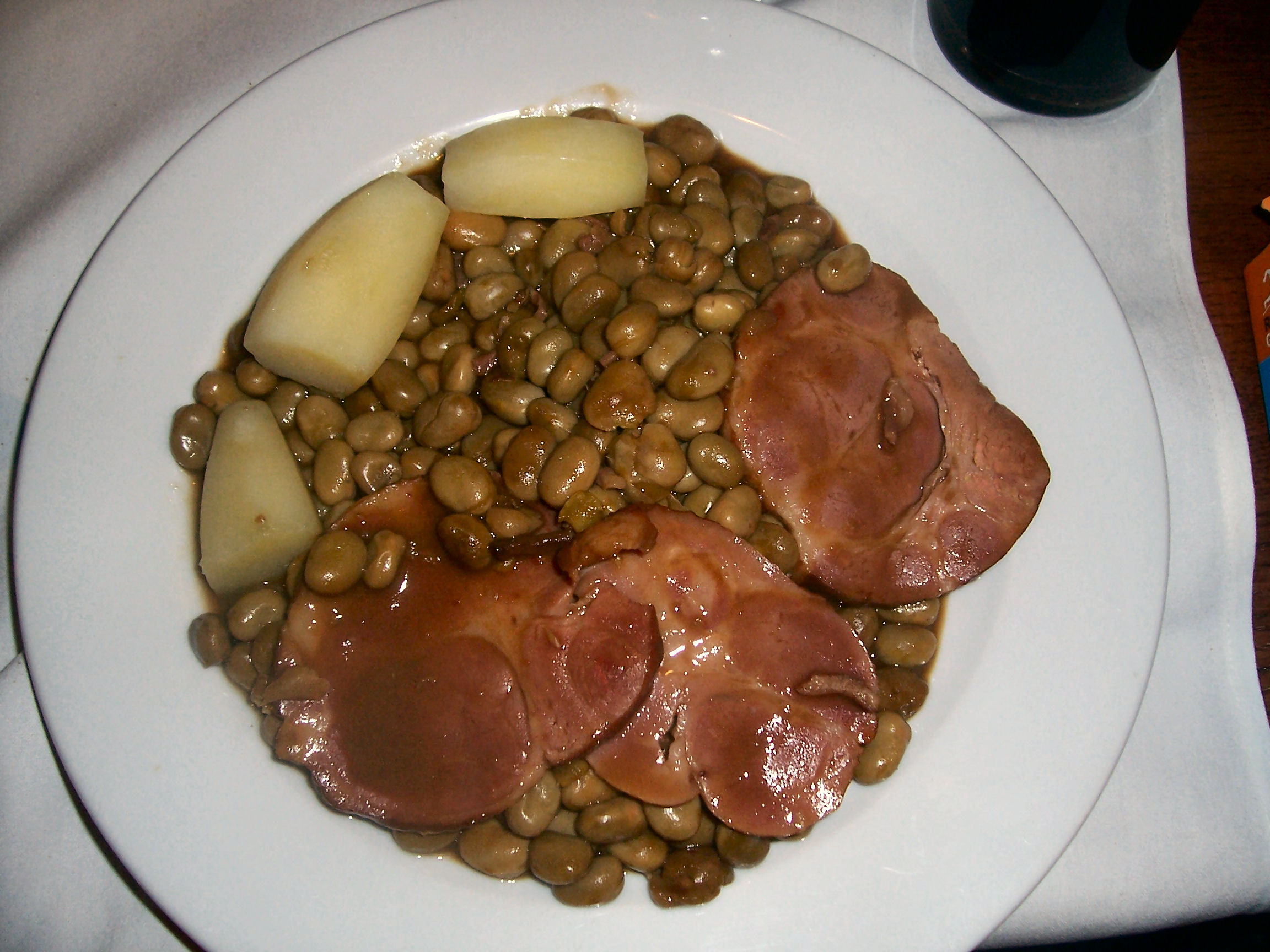
Judd mat Gaardebounen – smoked collar of pork with broad beans

- Jambonette
- Jambonneau
- Jar jow
- Jokbal – Korean pork dish
- Judd mat Gaardebounen – Savory dish from Luxembourg

=== K ===
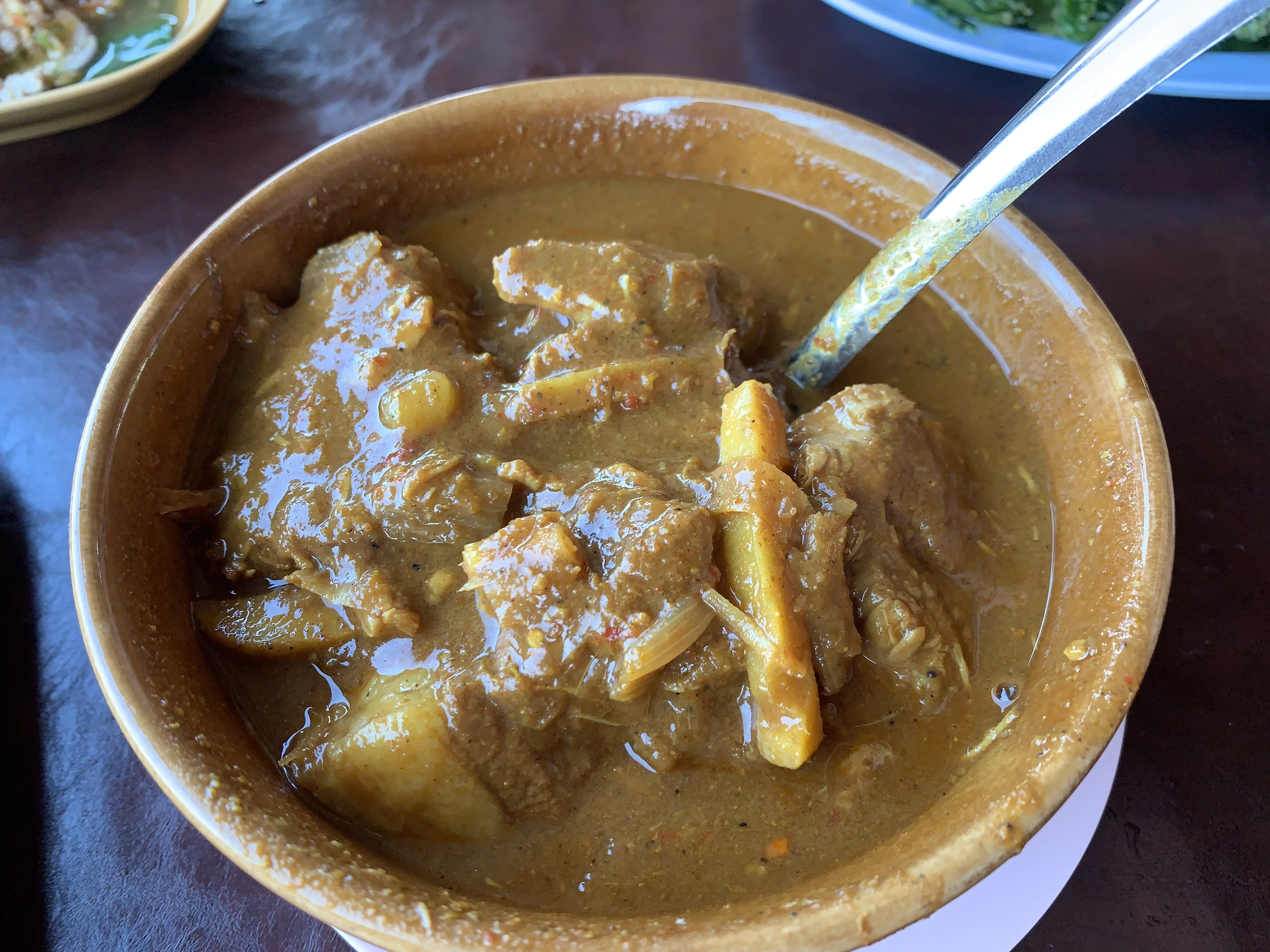
Kaeng hang le

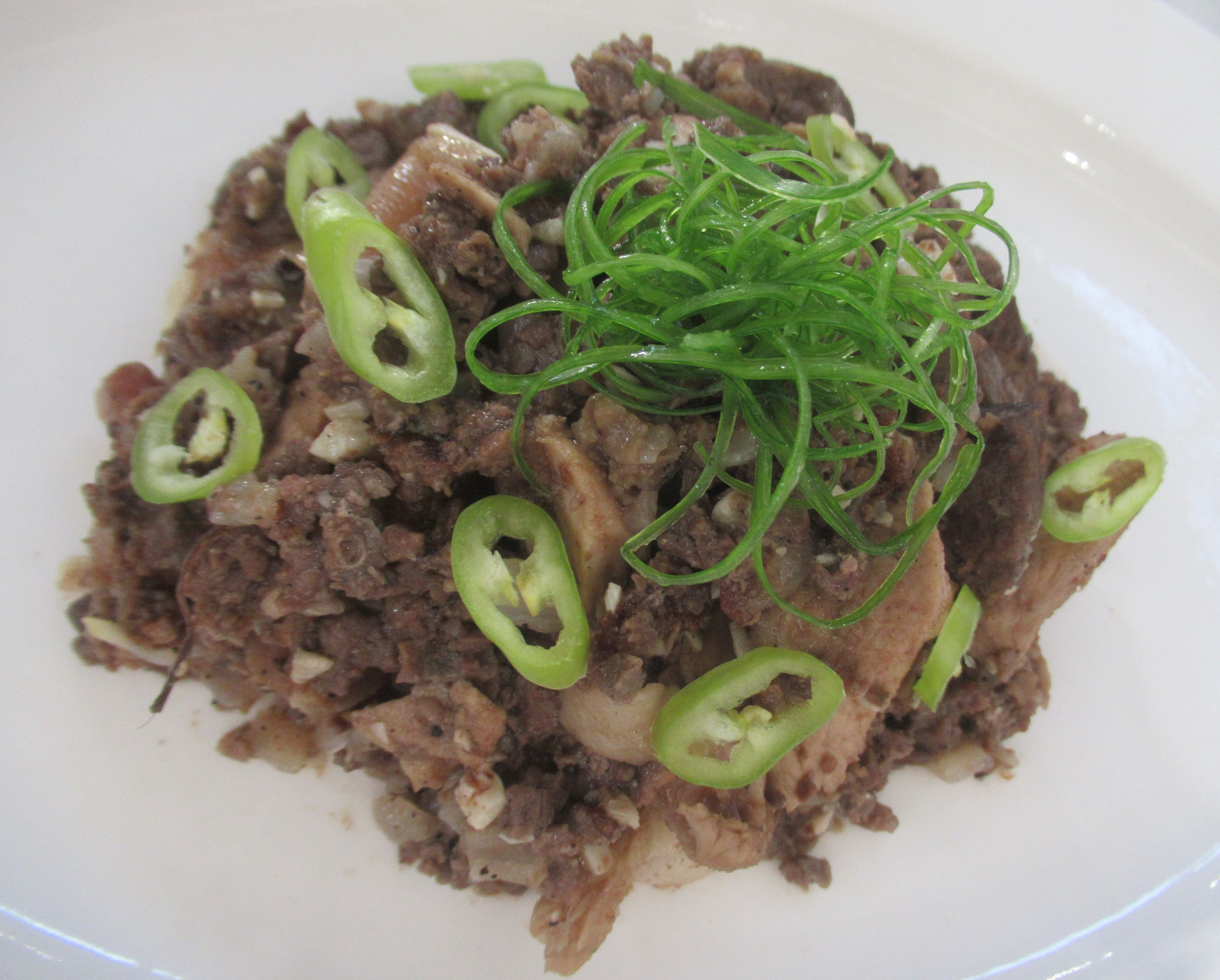
Kilayin

- Khaep mu – Pork skin, raw or fried
- Kakuni – Japanese braised pork dish
- Kalakukko – Finnish savoury pie
- King rib – British minced pork patty
- Khao kan chin
- Khanom chin nam ngiao – Food
- Kaeng hang le – Northern Thai curry dish
- Kotlet schabowy – Polish variety of breaded pork cutlet
- Kushikatsu – Japanese food
- Kway chap – Chinese dish of rice sheets and pork offal

=== L ===
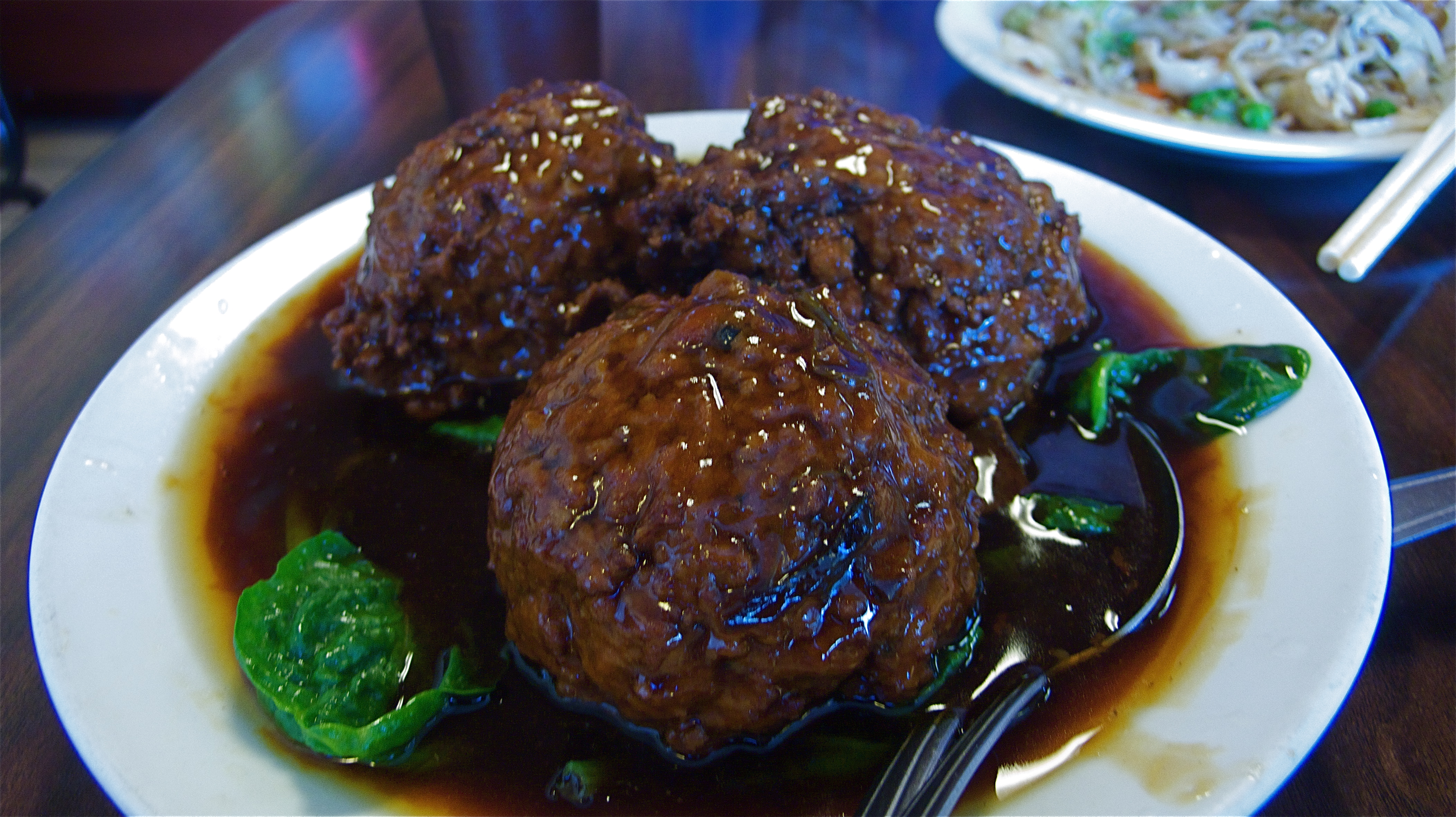
Red-cooked (soy-braised) lion's head meatballs

- Laulau – Traditional Polynesian dish of cooked taro leaves and stems
- Lechon – Piglet fed on its mother's milk
- Lechon kawali – Filipino-style deep-fried pork belly
- Lechon paksiw – Filipino cooking process
- Lechona – Piglet fed on its mother's milk
- Likëngë – Type of sausage
- Limerick ham
- Linat-an – Filipino stew or soup made from pork or beef with various vegetables
- Lion's head – Chinese stewed meatball dish
- Livermush – US pork and cornmeal dish
- Lountza – Meat delicacy
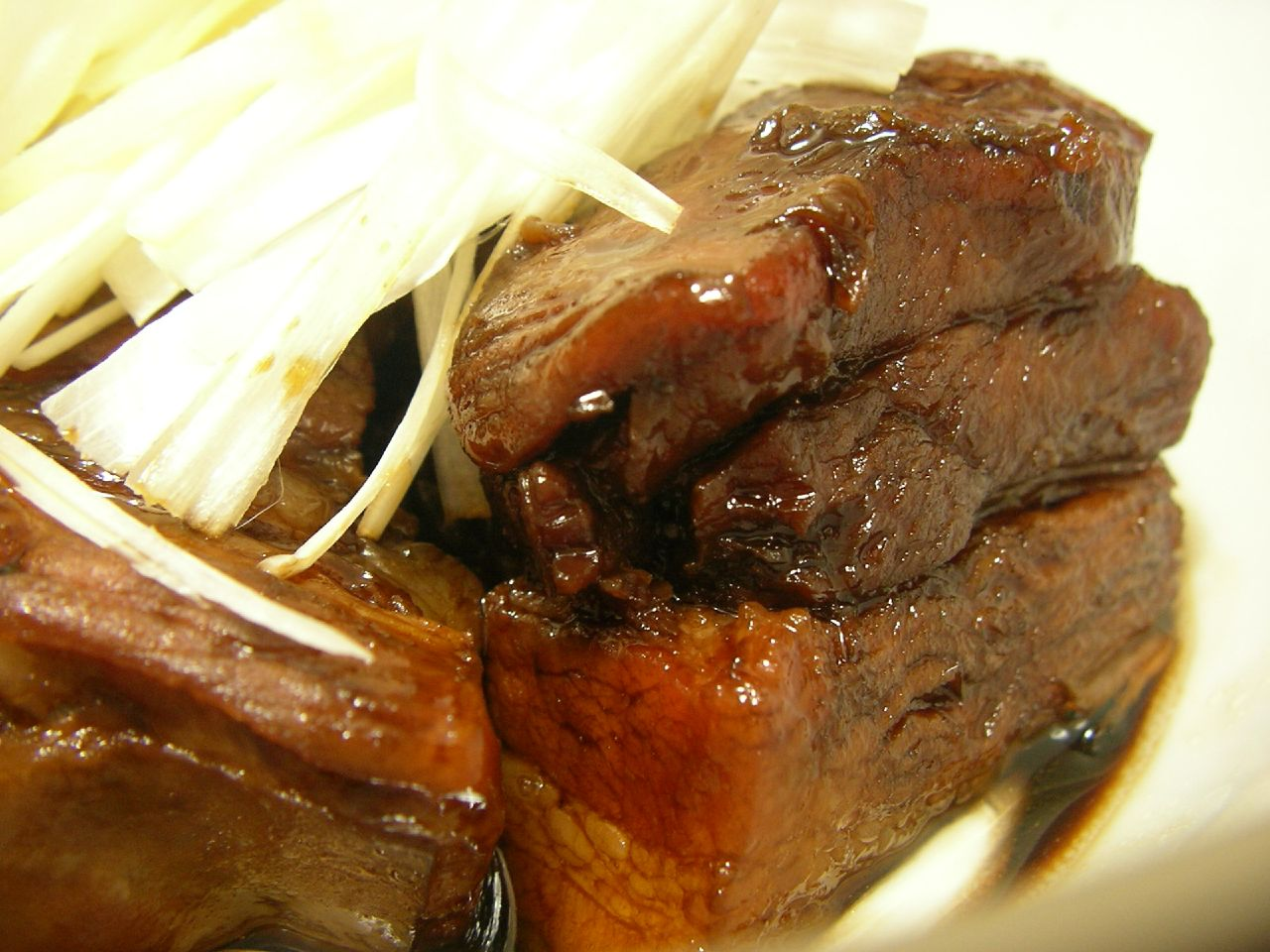
Kakuni is a Japanese braised pork dish which literally means "square simmered".

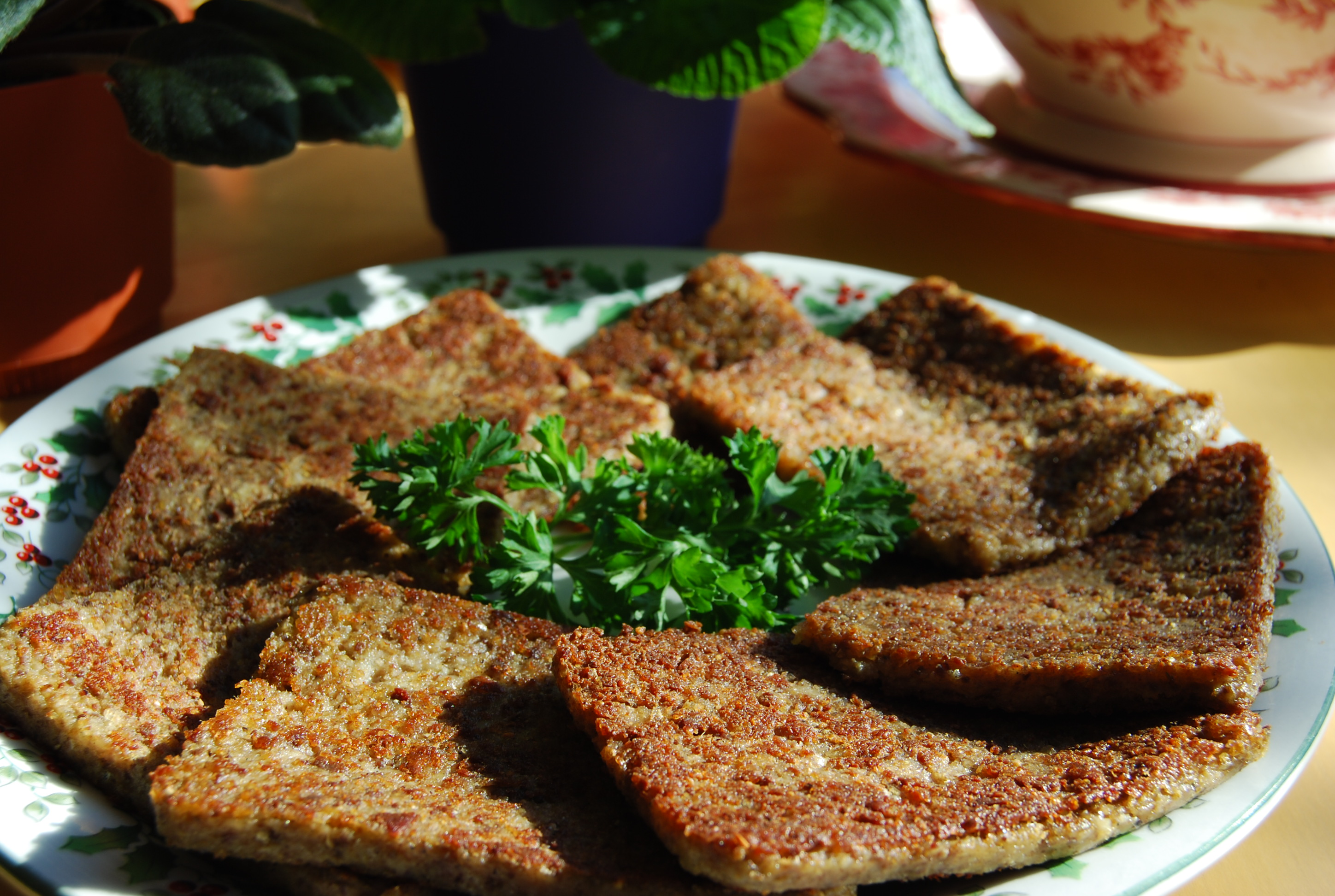
A pound of sliced, pan-fried livermush, garnished with parsley

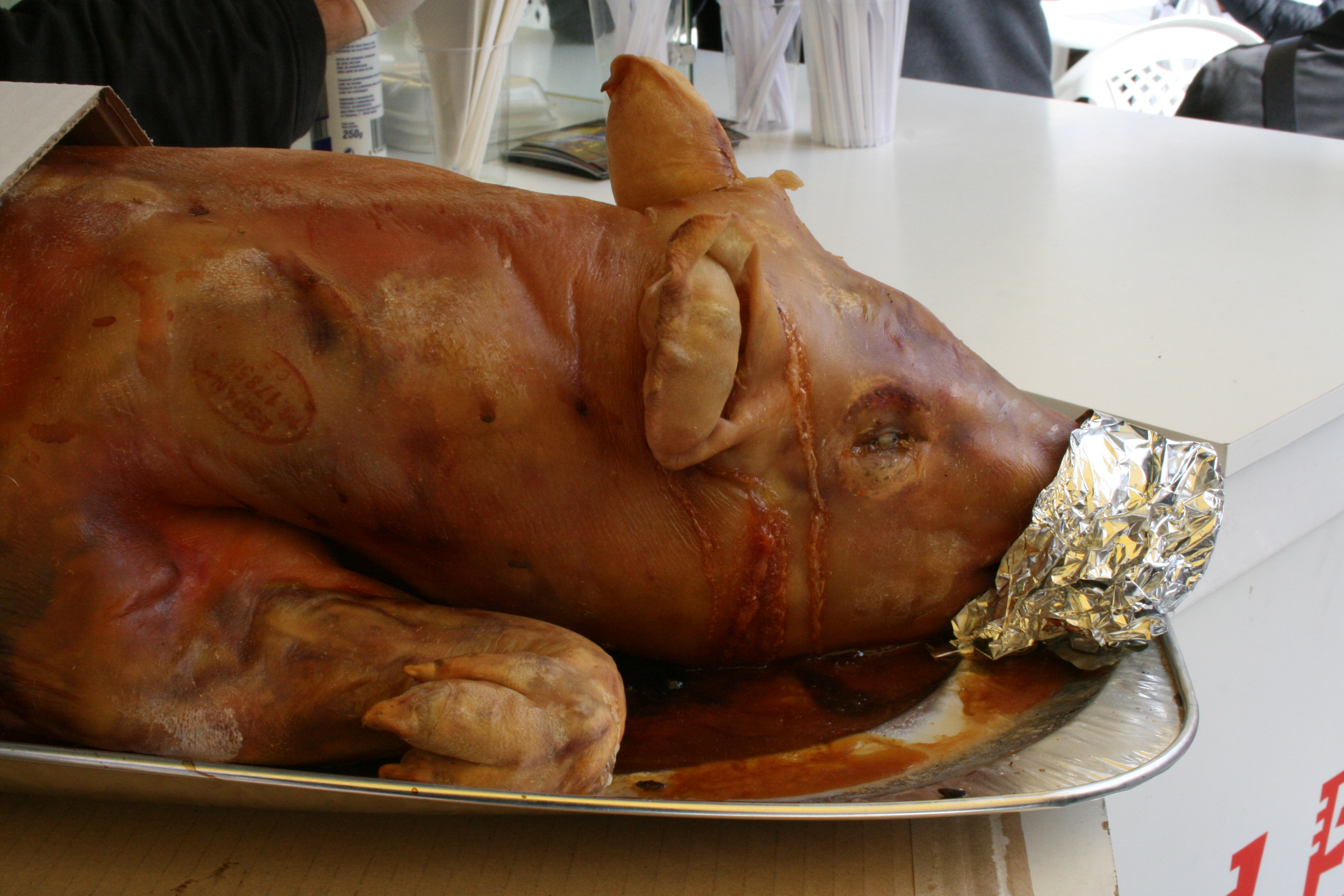
Lechona is a Colombian typical food

=== M ===
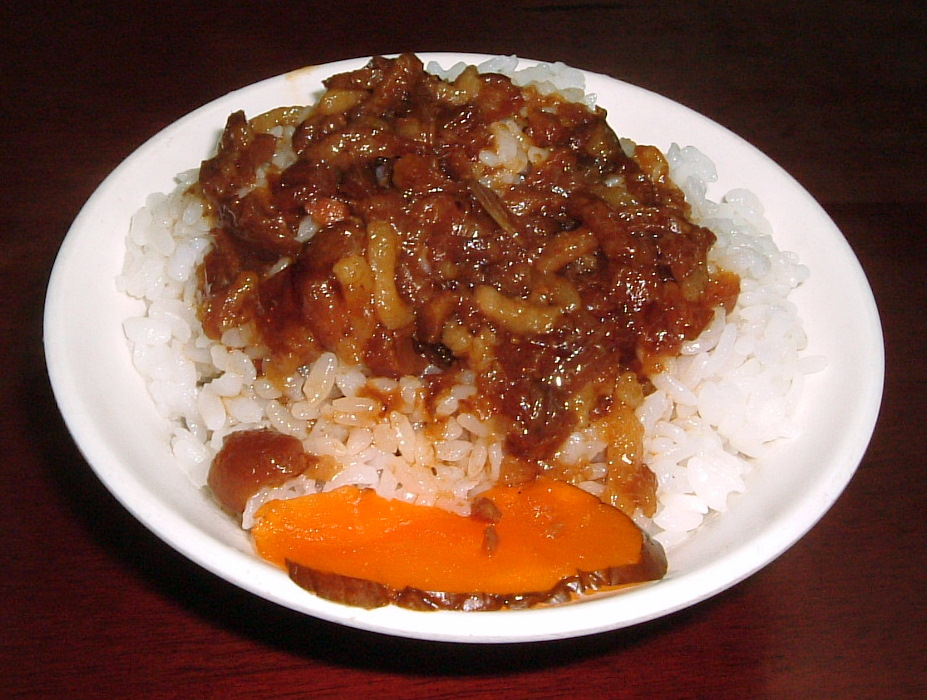
Minced pork rice

- Machaca – Mexican dish
- Mavželj
- Medisterpølse – Type of Scandinavian sausage
- Menudo (stew) – Philippine stew
- Mett – Minced raw pork
- Minced pork rice – Minced pork rice dish of China and Taiwan (Lo bah png, Taiwanese cuisine)
- Moo shu pork – American Chinese dish
- Mućkalica – Serbian dish
- Mu kratha – Thai table-cooked dish
- Mu ping – Street food in Thailand
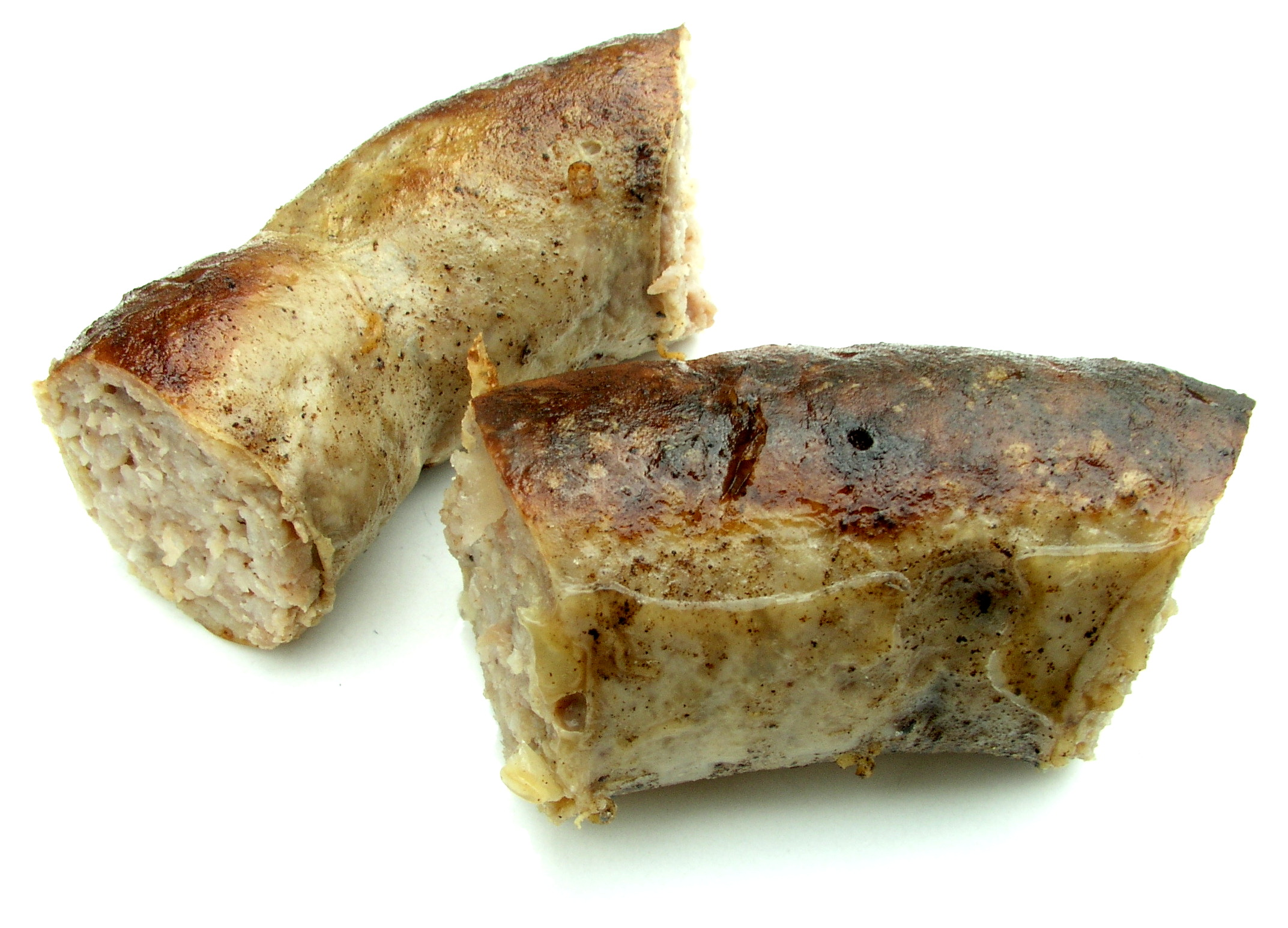
Fried medisterpølse sausage

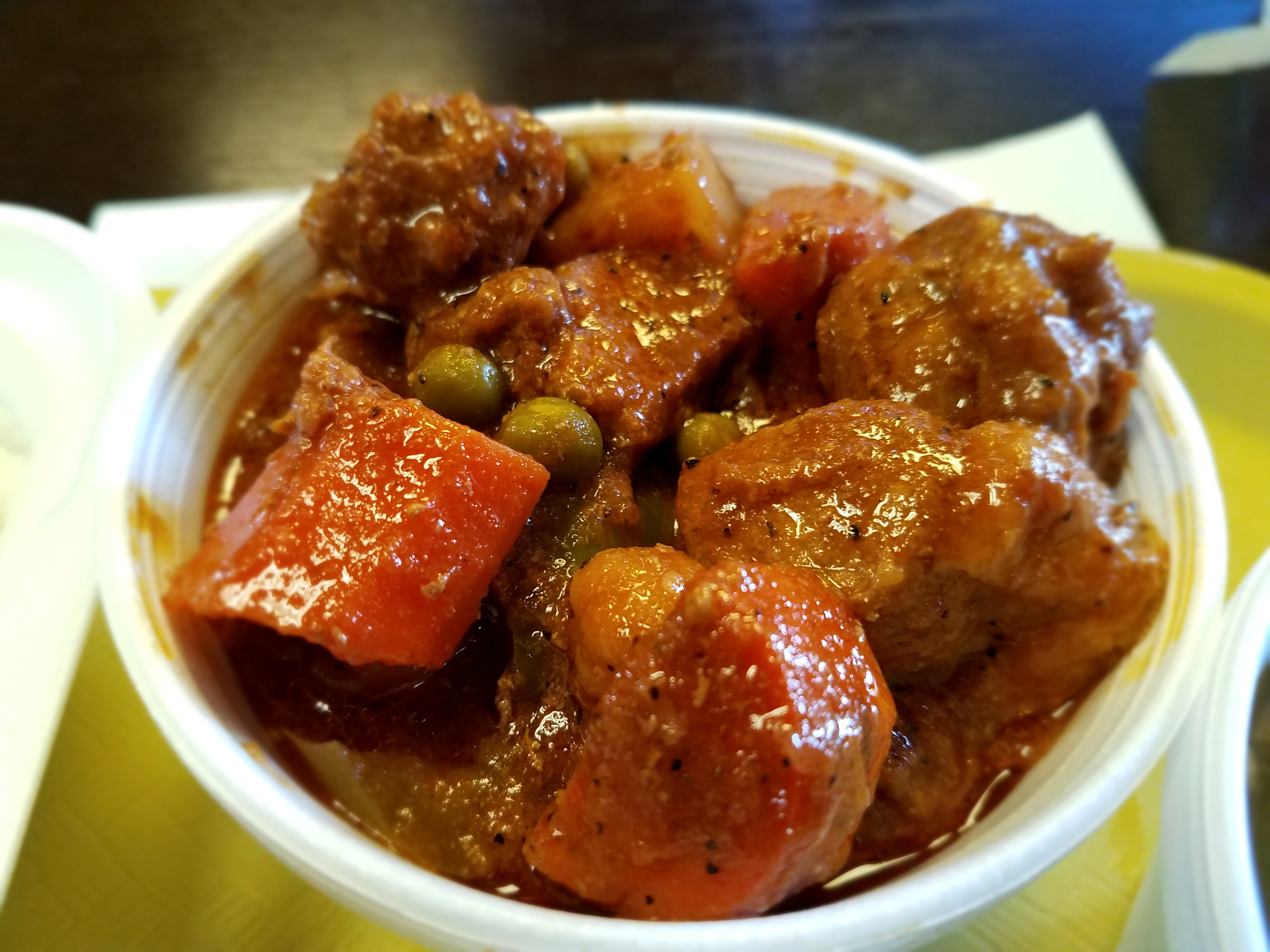
Menudo is a traditional stew from the Philippines.

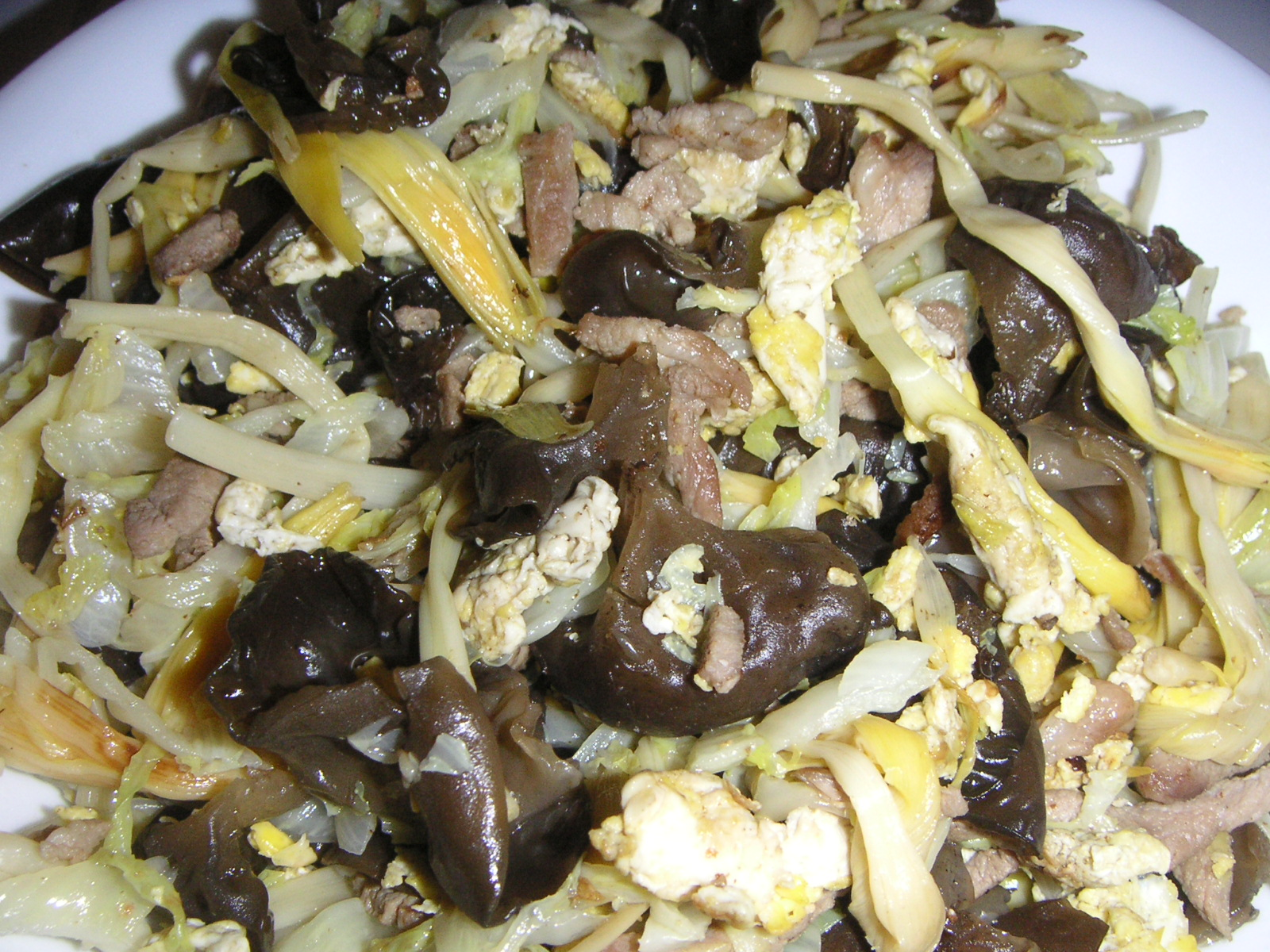
Moo shu pork, a dish of northern Chinese origin, possibly originally from Shandong

=== N ===
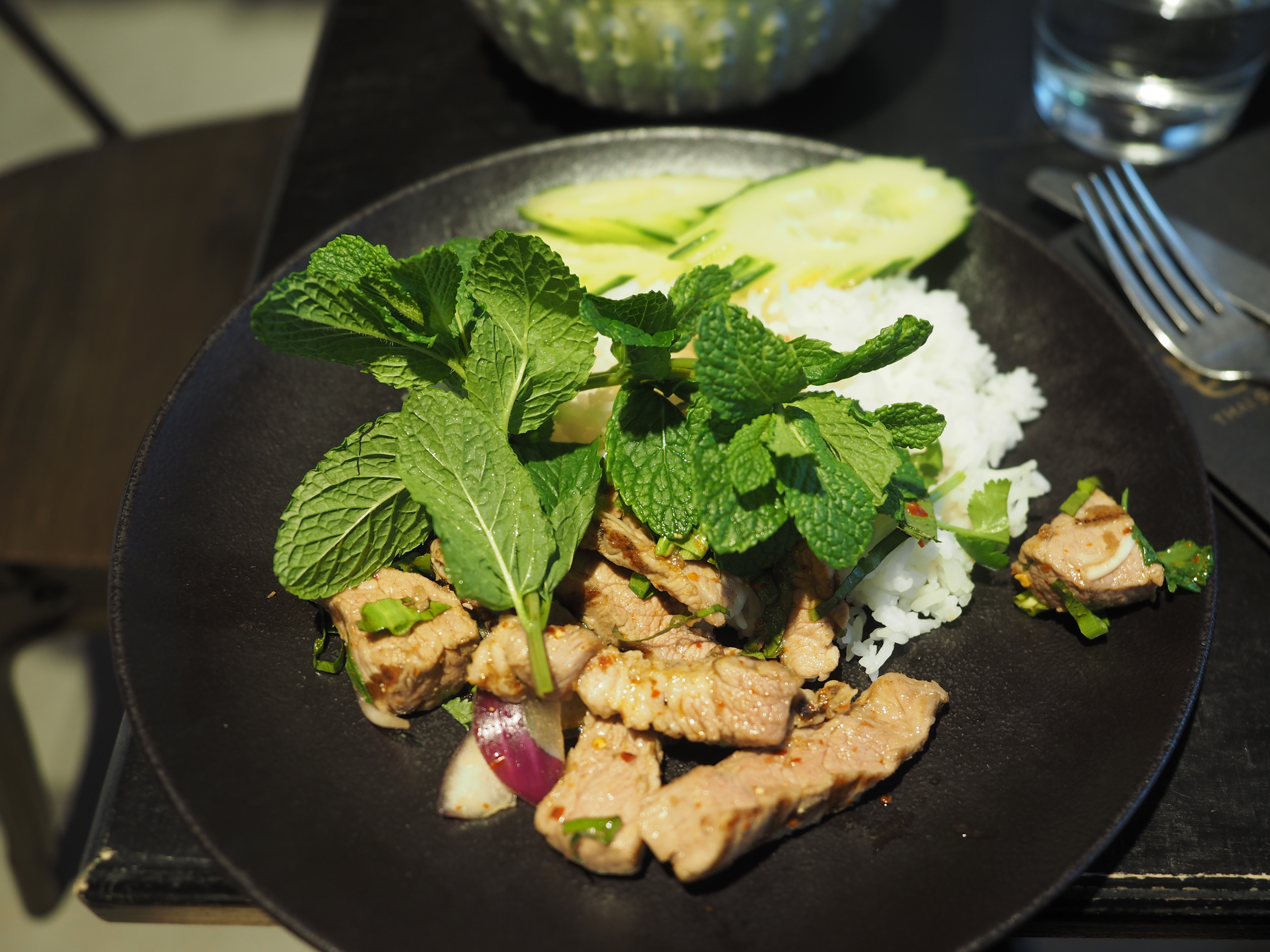
Nam tok mu is a Thai salad prepared using pork.

- Nam phrik ong – Dish in Northern Thai cuisine
- Nam tok mu – Thai and Lao pork salad
- Nataing
- Nikuman – Chinese filled bun
- Nilagang baboy – Filipino stew or soup made from pork or beef with various vegetables

=== O ===
- Okinawa soba – Type of Japanese noodle
- Oreilles de crisse – Quebec dish (food)

=== P ===
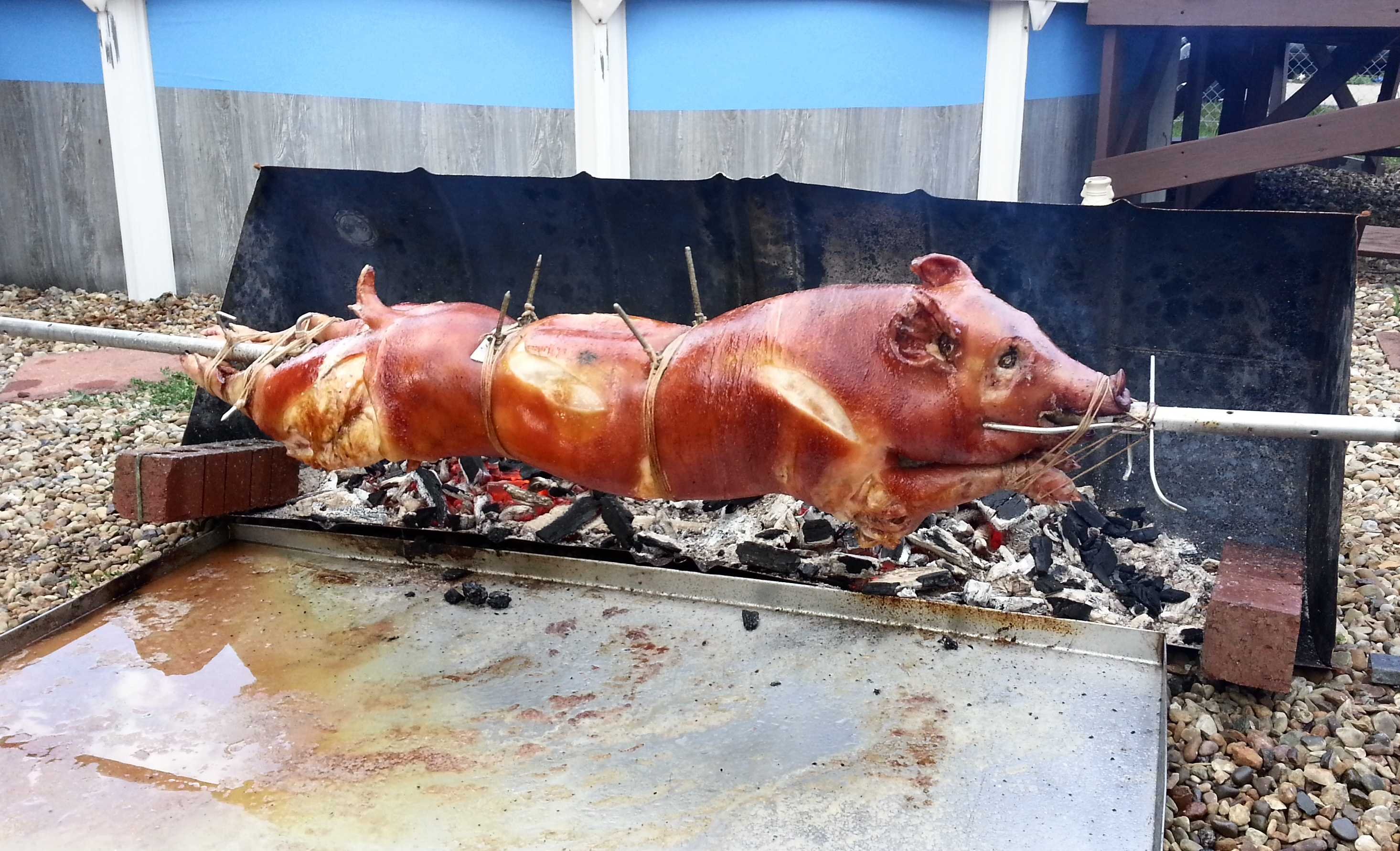
A pig roasting on a rotating spit

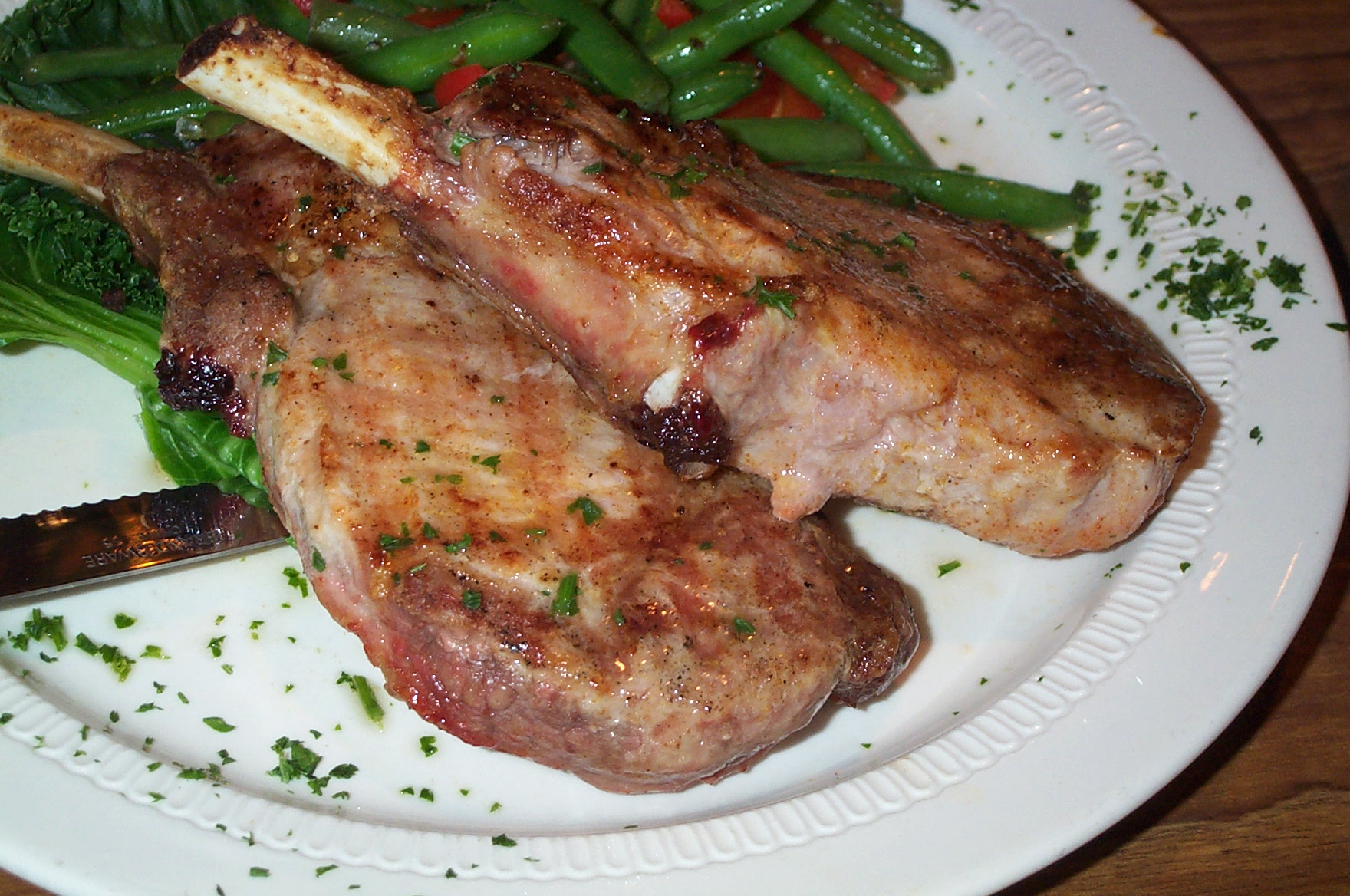
Pork chops, cooked and served

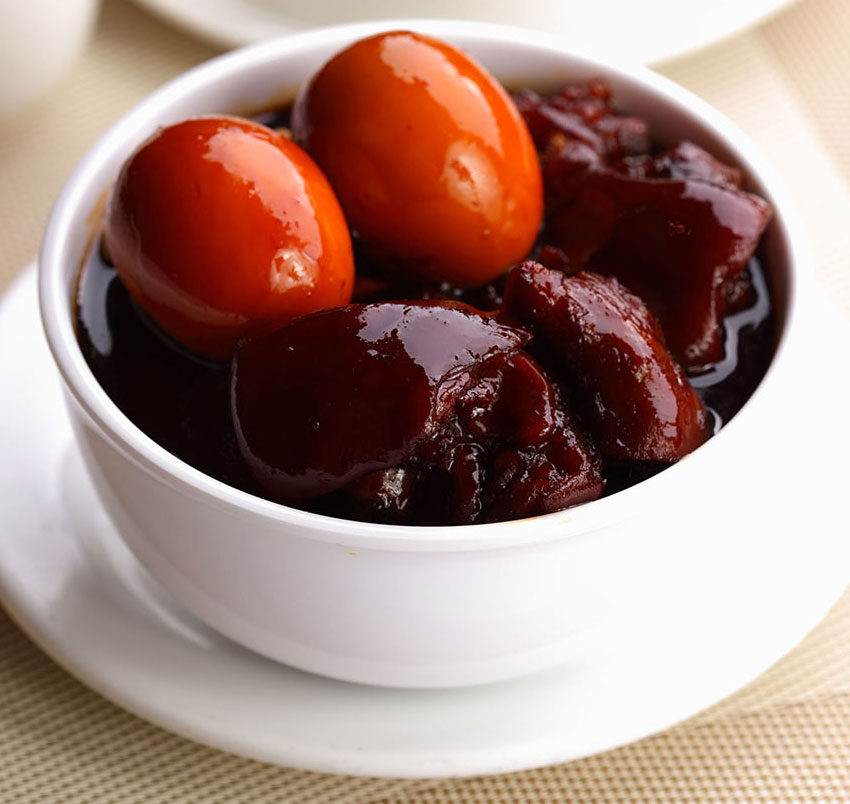
Pork knuckles and ginger stew is a dish in traditional Cantonese cuisine.

- Paksiw na baboy – Filipino cooking process
- Pambazo – Mexican traditional dish
- Pastie – Northern Ireland dish of battered deep-fried meat and vegetables
- Pata tim – Filipino pork dish
- Peking pork – Chinese meat dish
- Pernil – Slow-roasted marinated pork dish
- Petit Salé – Salted pork
- Pickle meat – Meat, typically offal, in vinegar
- Pig fallopian tubes – Malaysian stir-fry dish
- Pig roast – Mealtime event roasting a whole pig
- Pig's ear – Cooked ear of pig for human consumption
- Pig's organ soup – Malaysian and Singaporean soup
- Pig's trotters – Culinary term for pig's feet
- Porchetta – Italian pork dish
- Pork and beans – Culinary dish
- Pork asado – Filipino meat dish
- Pork ball – Traditional Taiwanese pork dish
- Pork blood soup – Soup made with pork blood
- Pork cake – Cake containing salt pork
- Pork chop – Type of meat cut, sometimes served with applesauce
- Pork chop bun – Macau snack
- Pork chops and applesauce – Dish in American cuisine
- Pork Bafat – Indian pork dish
- Pork knuckle – Joint on the hog's leg between the ham and trotter
- Pork knuckles and ginger stew – Cantonese dish
- Pork pie – English meat pie
- Pork ribs – Cut of pork
- Poume d'oranges – Medieval pork dish
- Pulled pork – Pork barbecue dish of the Southern United States
- Pyeonyuk – Korean boiled beef or pork dish
- Pig bladder – Urinary bladder of a domestic pig, with many human uses

=== R ===
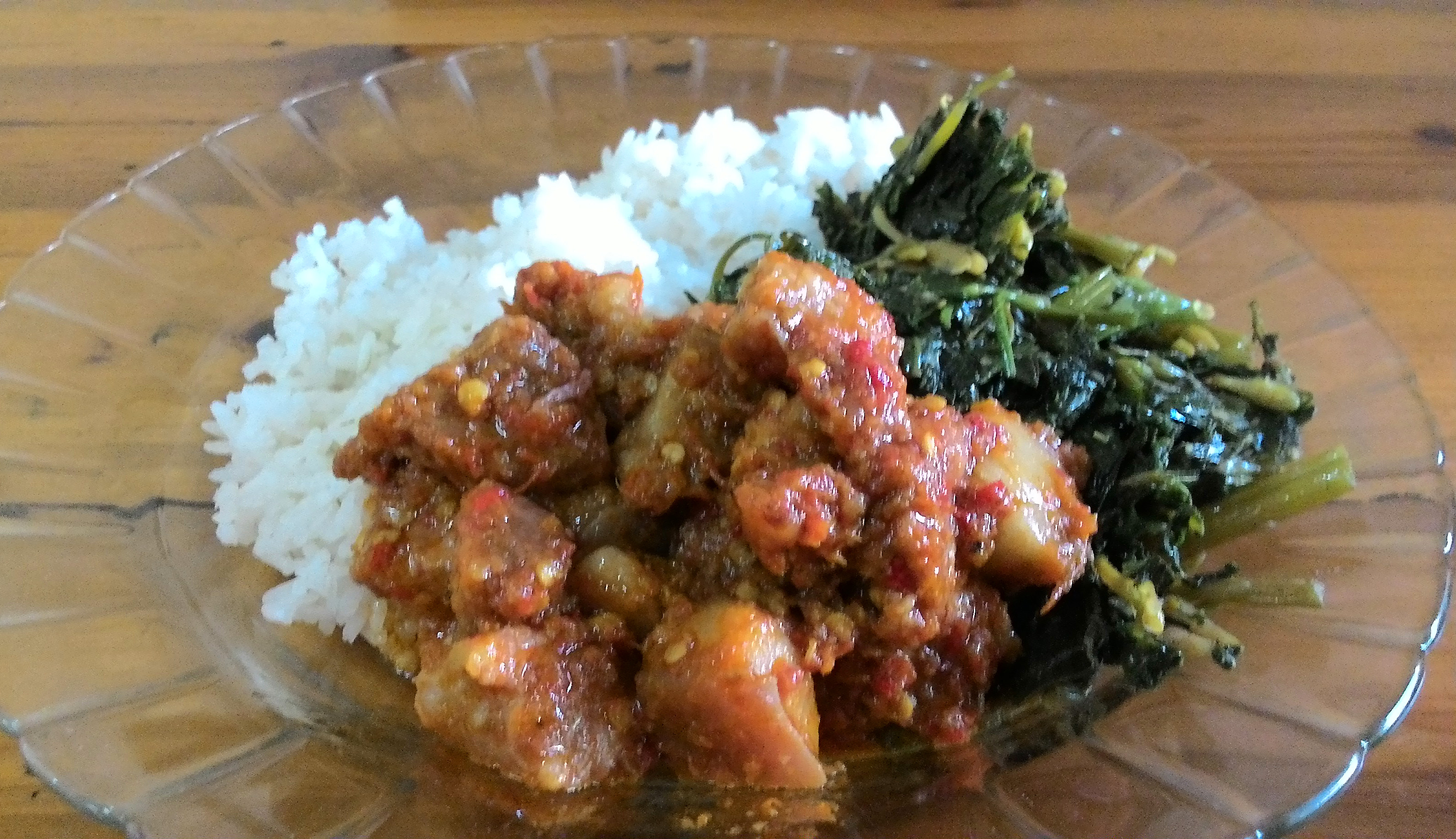
Pork rica-rica

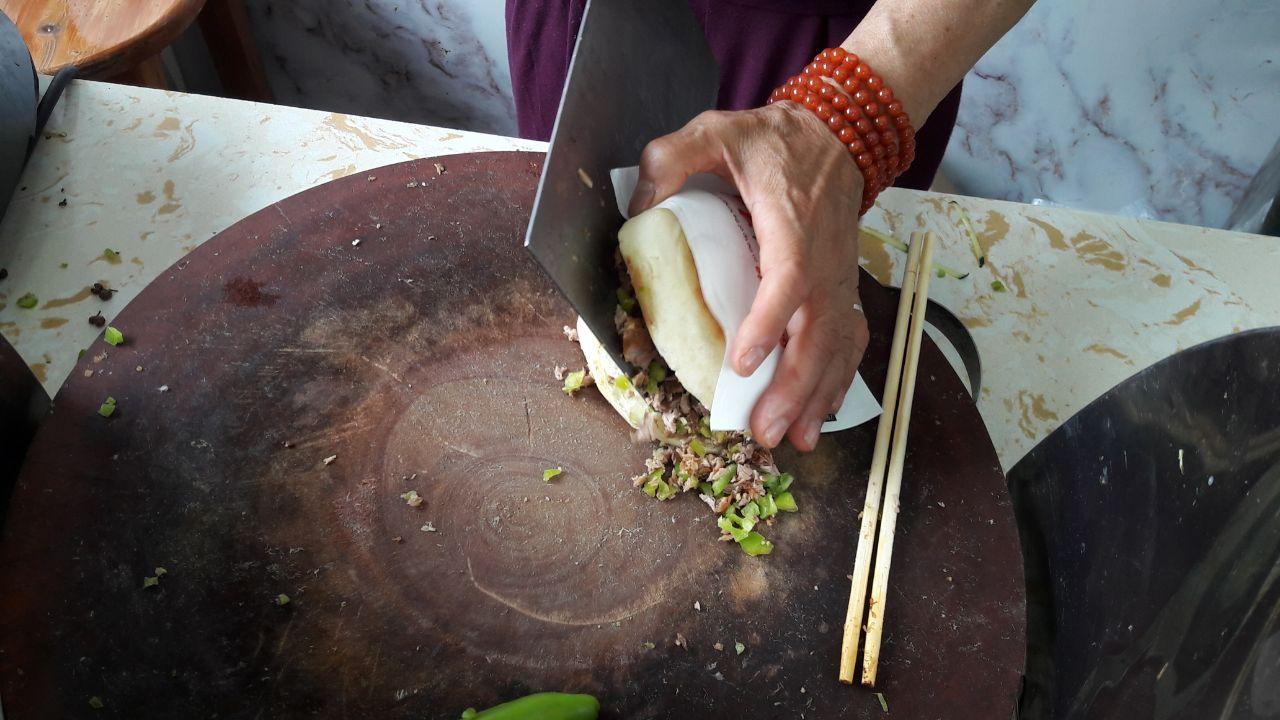
Roujiamo being prepared

- Rafute – Pork rib dish in the Okinawan cuisine
- Red braised pork belly – Chinese braised pork dish, or Mao's pork belly
- Rica-rica – Indonesian hot and spicy spice mixture, pork version
- Roasted piglet – Mealtime event roasting a whole pig
- Roast pork:
  - Pernil – Slow-roasted marinated pork dish in Latin American cuisine
  - Porchetta – Italian pork dish, or Italian roast pork, in Italian cuisine
  - Siu yuk – Variety of roast pork in Cantonese cuisine in Cantonese cuisine
  - Yakiniku – Korean-style grilled meat cuisine in Japan in Japanese cuisine
  - Flæskesteg – Danish roast pork in Danish cuisine
- Rosticciana – Italian pork dish
- Roujiamo – Chinese street food of meat in flatbread
- Rousong – Dried meat product from China
- Ruan zha li ji
- Rundstück warm – Warm slice of meat served in a halved roll

=== S ===
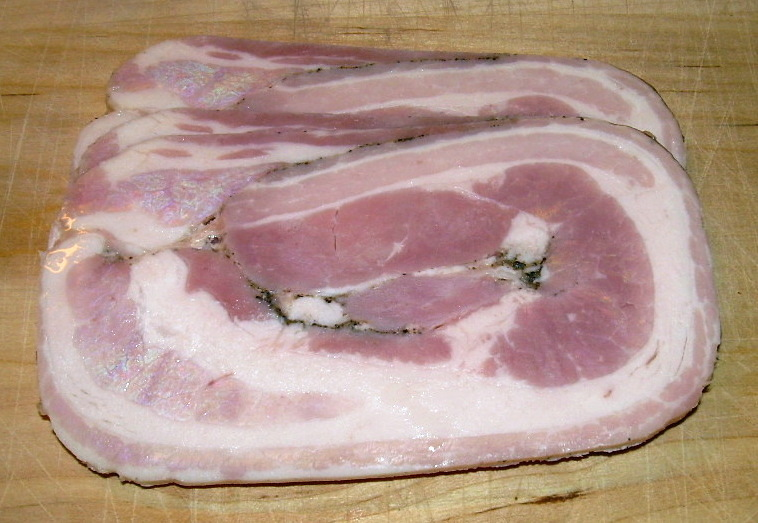
Rullepølse (spiced meat roll)

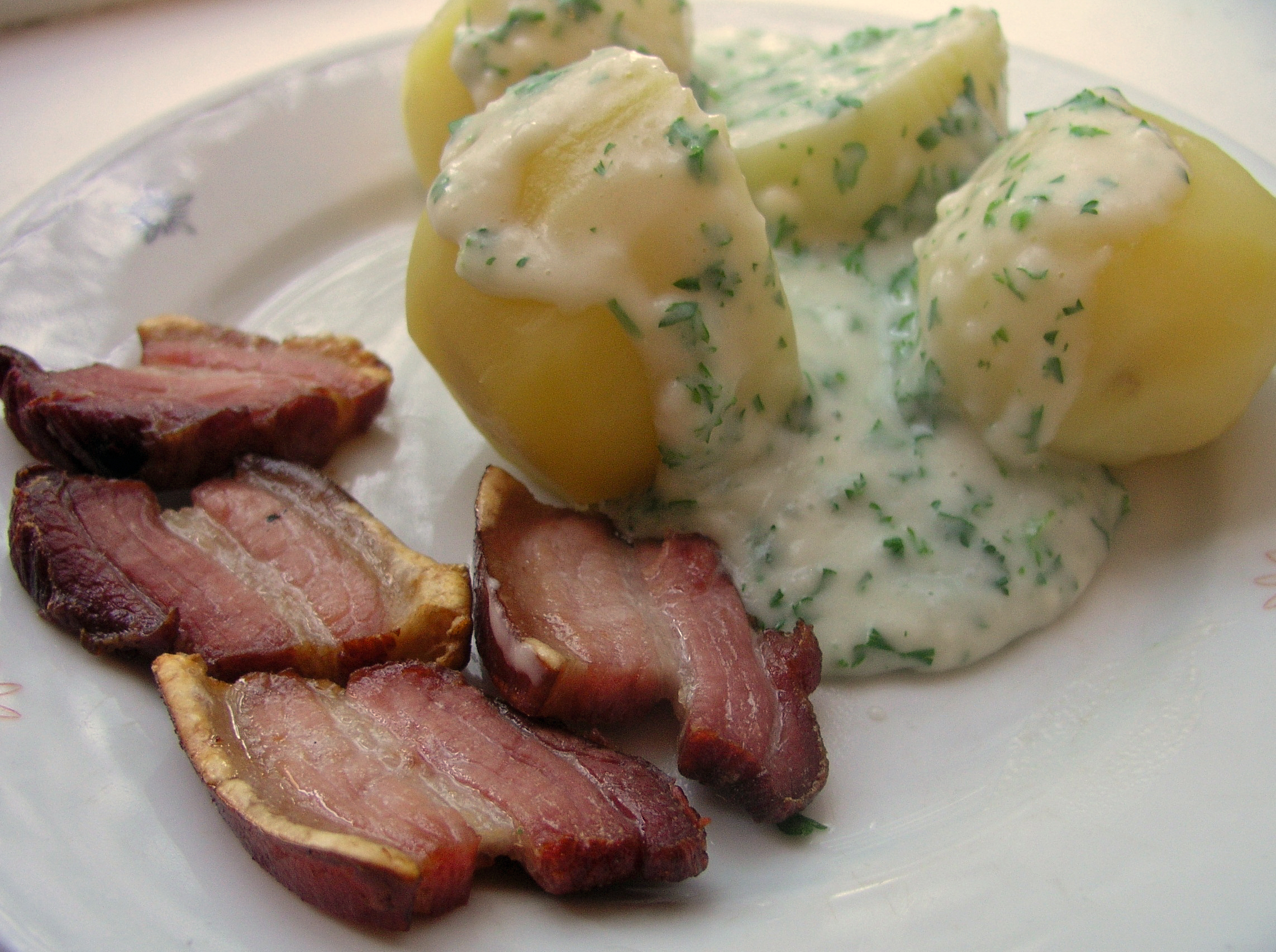
Stegt flæsk is a dish of fried bacon from Denmark that is generally served with potatoes and a parsley sauce (med persillesovs).

- Sai krok Isan – Thai fermented sausage
- Sai ua – Seasoned pork sausage in Laos, Myanmar, and Thailand
- Saksang – Indonesian pork dishes
- Sakhu sai mu (Tapioca Balls with Pork Filling) – Thai snack food
- Salsiccia cruda – Italian spiced pork cruda
- Saltimbocca – Italian dish
- Samgyeopsal – Korean grilled pork belly dish
- Sarapatel – Portuguese ingredient mix
- Sate babi – Southeast Asian form of kebab
- Schweinshaxe – German roasted pork dish
- Schwenker – German device to grill meat
- Se'i – Indonesian smoked meat dish
- Senate bean soup – Soup served in the United States Senate
- Sisig – Filipino dish that consists of pork scraps
- Siu yuk – Variety of roast pork in Cantonese cuisine
- Skirts and kidneys – Irish stew
- Slavink – Meat dish
- Spiced meat roll – Traditional Danish spiced cold cut meat roll
- St. Louis-style barbecue – Spare ribs dish
- Steam minced pork – Chinese pork dish
- Stegt flæsk – Danish pork dish
- Stuffed chine – Herb-filled pork dish of Lincolnshire, England
- Stuffed ham – Ham dish from Maryland, United States
- Suckling pig – Piglet fed on its mother's milk
- Sườn nướng – Vietnamese grilled pork ribs
- Švargl – Cold cut non-dairy meat jelly or terrine
- Sweet and Sour Pork – Chinese dish consisting of fried pork tenders with sweet and sour sauce
- Syltelabb – Norwegian pig's trotter dish
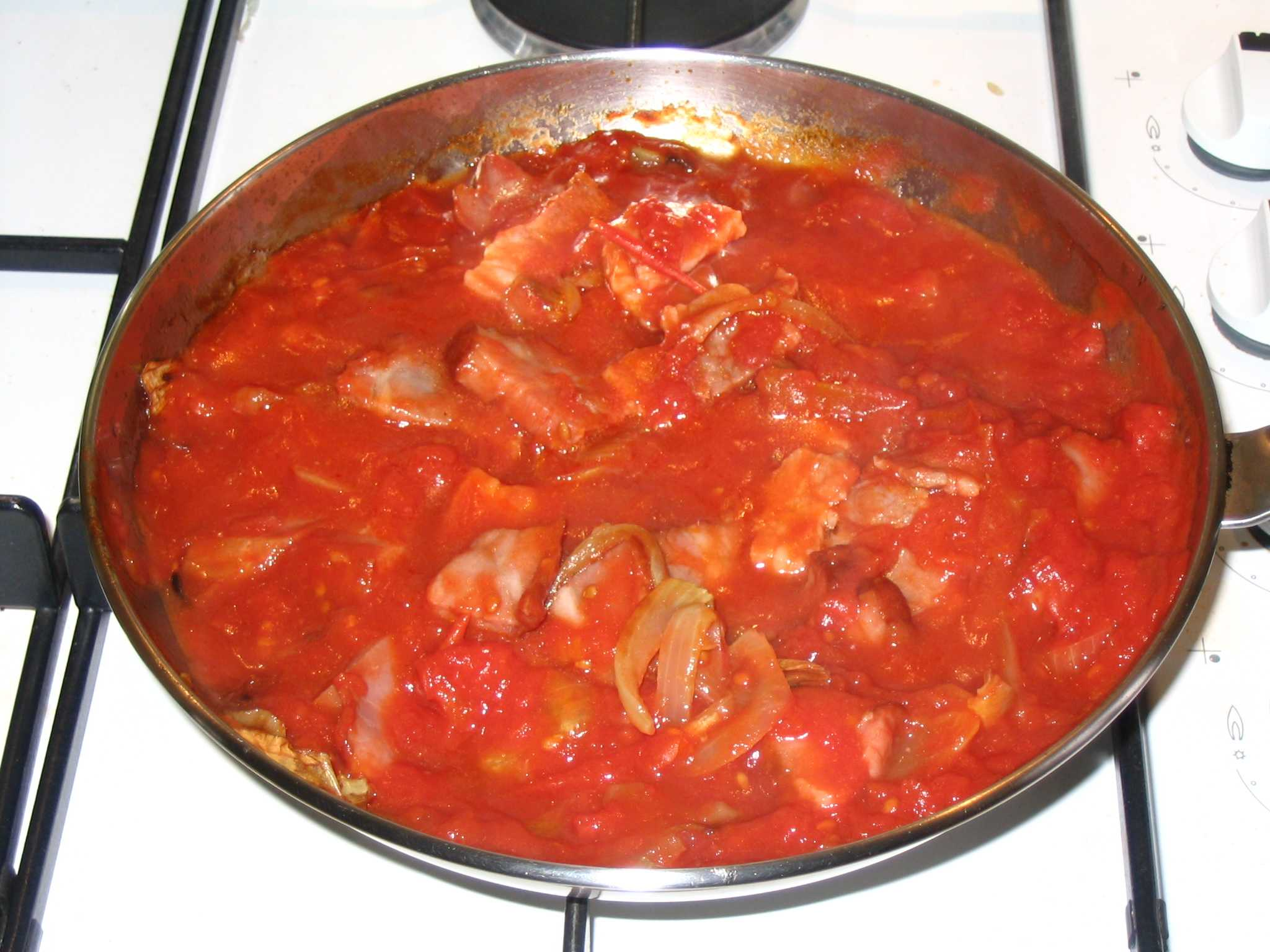
Amatriciana sauce is a traditional Italian pasta sauce based on guanciale (cured pork cheek), pecorino cheese, and tomato.

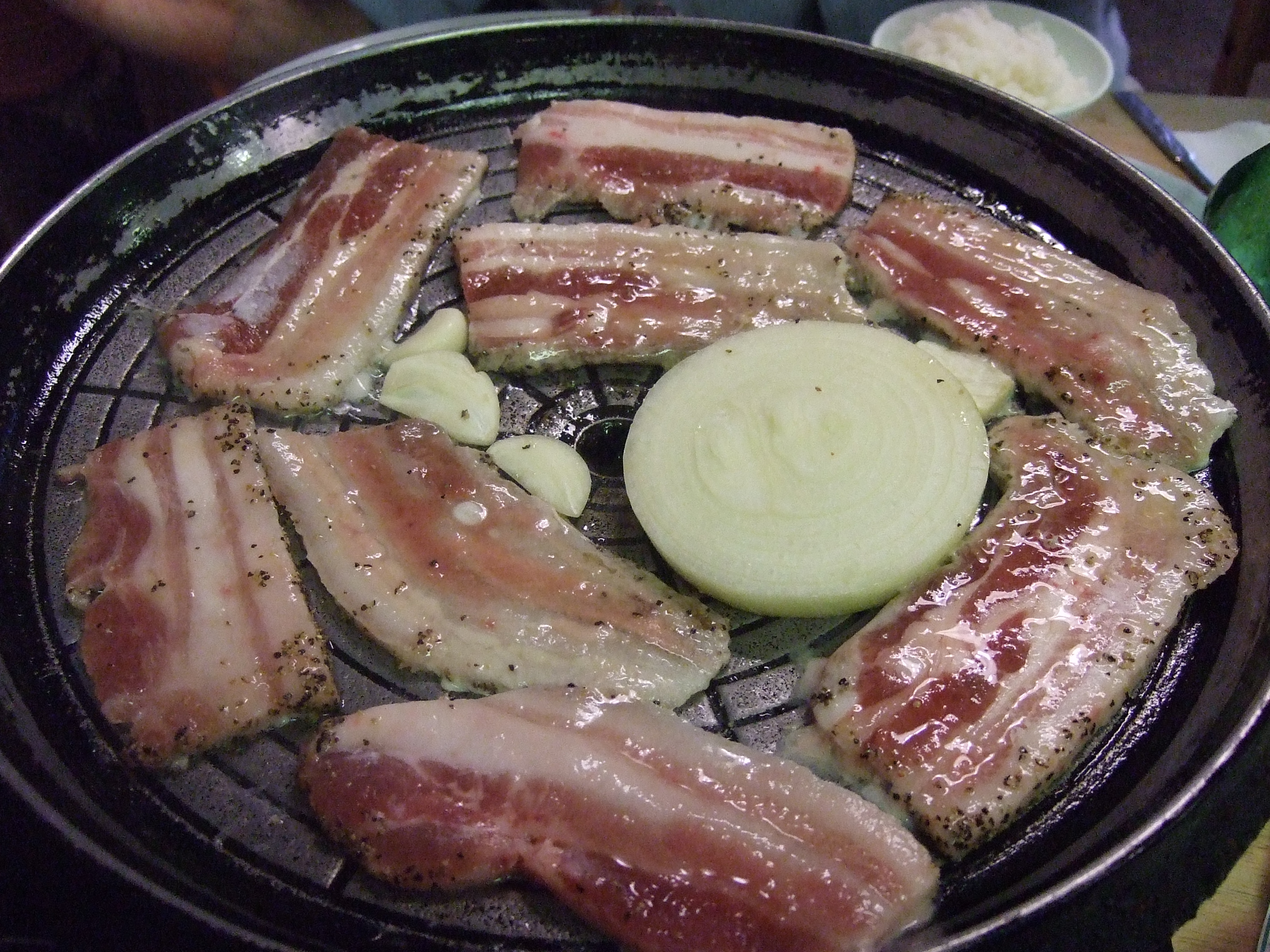
Samgyeopsal is a popular Korean dish that is commonly served as an evening meal. It consists of thick, fatty slices of pork belly meat.

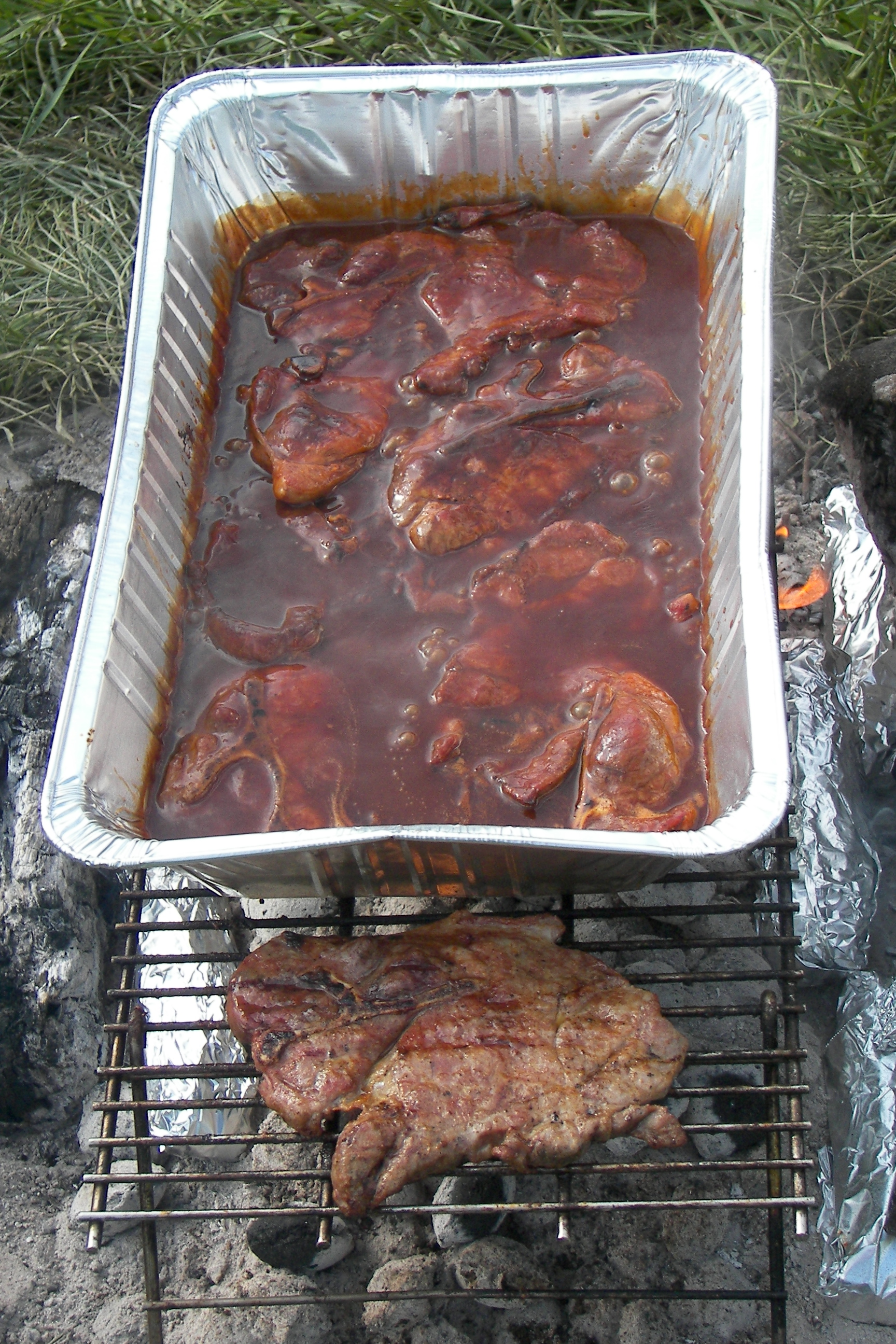
St. Louis-style barbecue – pork steaks cooking

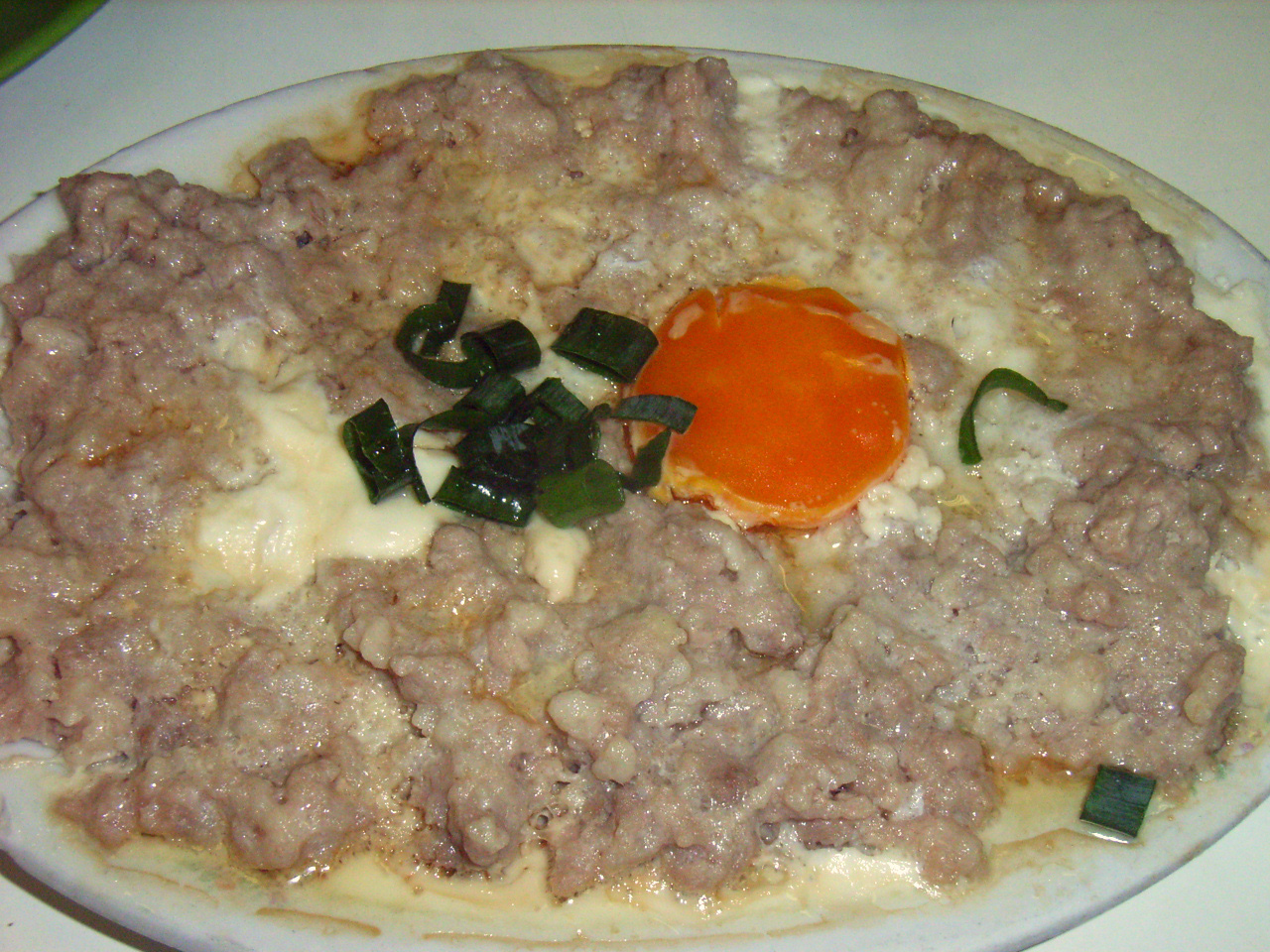
Steam minced pork topped with salted egg and green onion

=== T ===
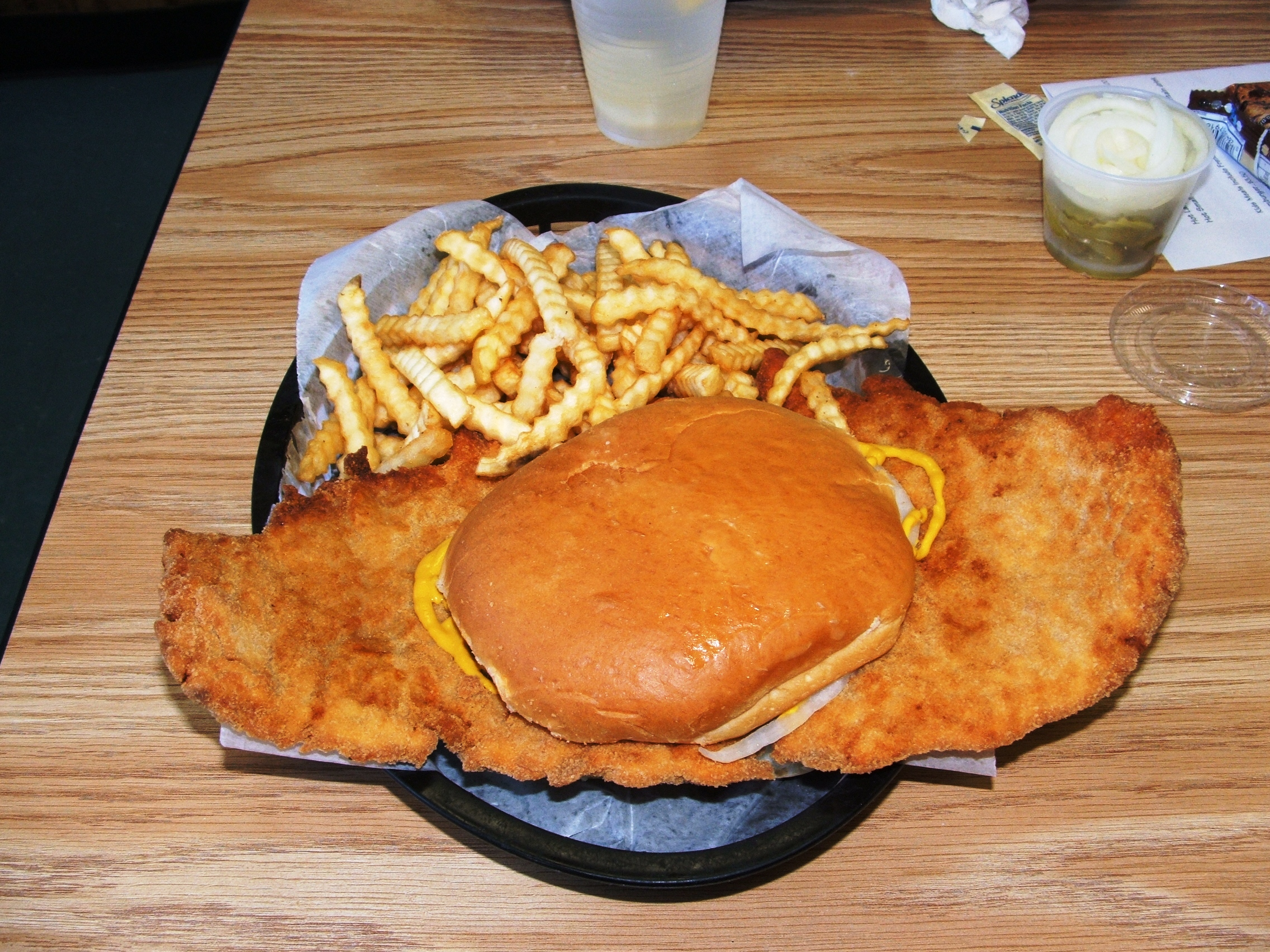
A pork tenderloin sandwich, with a side dish of French fries

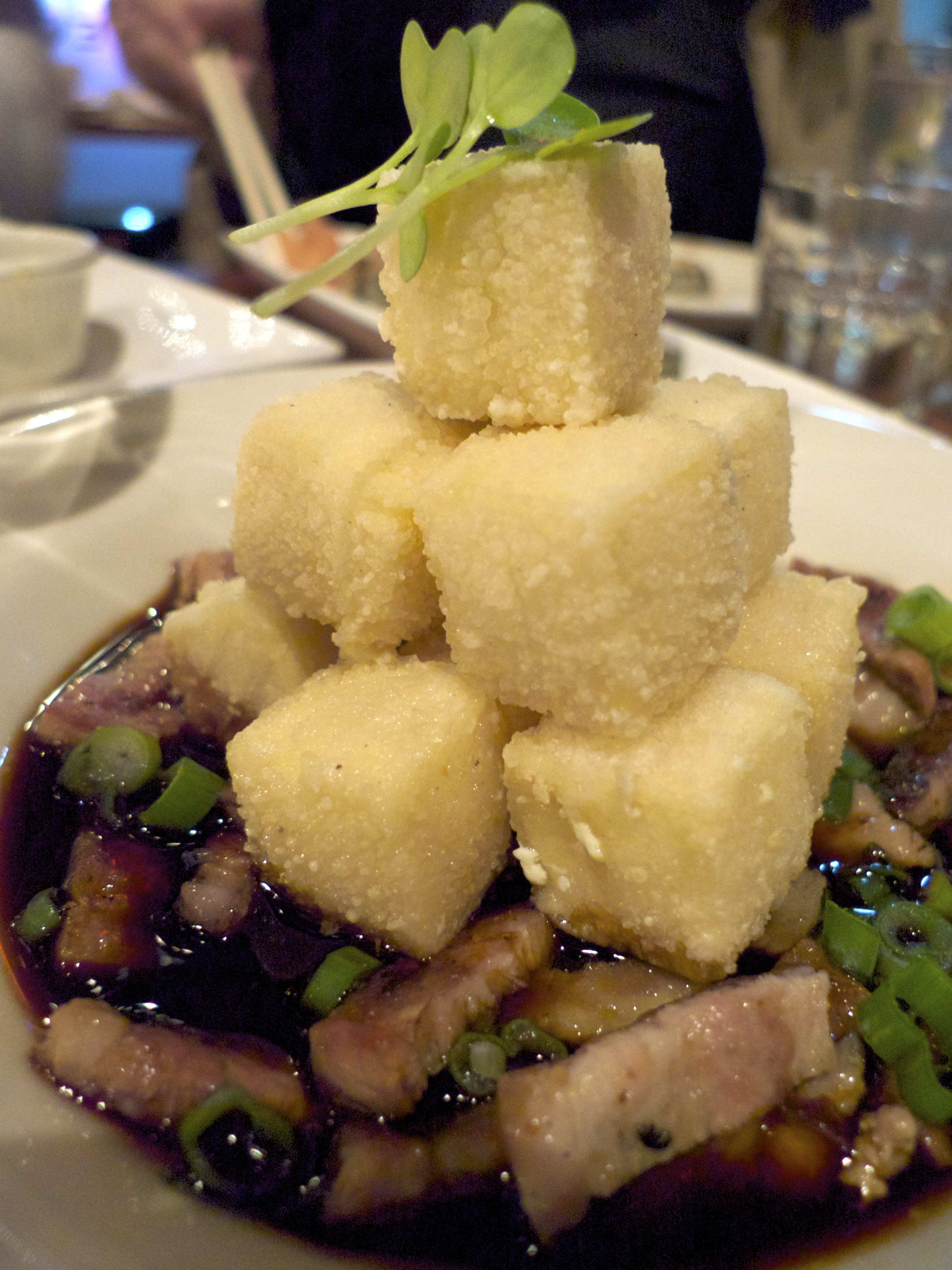
Tokwa't baboy is a typical Philippine appetizer consisting of pork ears, pork belly and deep-fried tofu.

- Tamale – Traditional Mesoamerican dish
- Taro dumpling – Chinese cuisine
- Tenderloin – Cut of pork
- Tenderloin sandwich – Type of sandwich originating in the US
- Thai suki – Thai hot pot
- Tocino – Crunchy strips of skin and bacon cut from pork loin
- Tokwa’t baboy – Filipino dish
- Tonkatsu – Japanese dish of deep-fried pork
- Tonkotsu – Ramen variety from Fukuoka, Japan
- Tourtière – French-Canadian meat pie dish
- Trinxat – Potato, cabbage, and pork dish from the Pyrenees
- Tuotuorou – Chinese pork dish
- Twice-cooked pork – Chinese pork dish

=== V ===
- Vepřo knedlo zelo – Czech national dish
- Vindaloo – Type of curry
- Vinyali

=== W ===
- Waknatoy – Philippine stew
- Wanluan pork knuckle – Traditional Taiwanese ham hock dish
- Wet Tha Dote Htoe – Burmese street food

=== Y ===
- Yuxiang shredded pork – Chinese pork dish
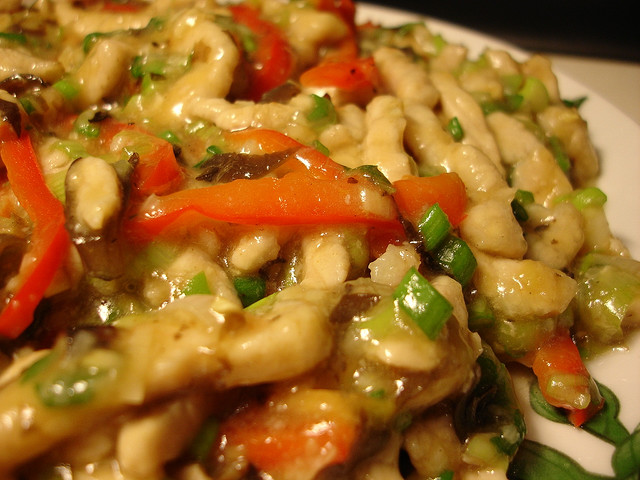
Yuxiang shredded pork, also called fish flavored pork slices, is a common type of Sichuan cuisine.

== See also ==
- Bacon
- List of bacon substitutes
- List of beef dishes
- List of chicken dishes
- List of fish dishes
- List of hams
- List of ham dishes
- List of lamb dishes
- List of meatball dishes
- List of sausage dishes
- List of sausages
- List of seafood dishes
- Religious restrictions on the consumption of pork
