= Tuotuorou =

Chinese pork dish

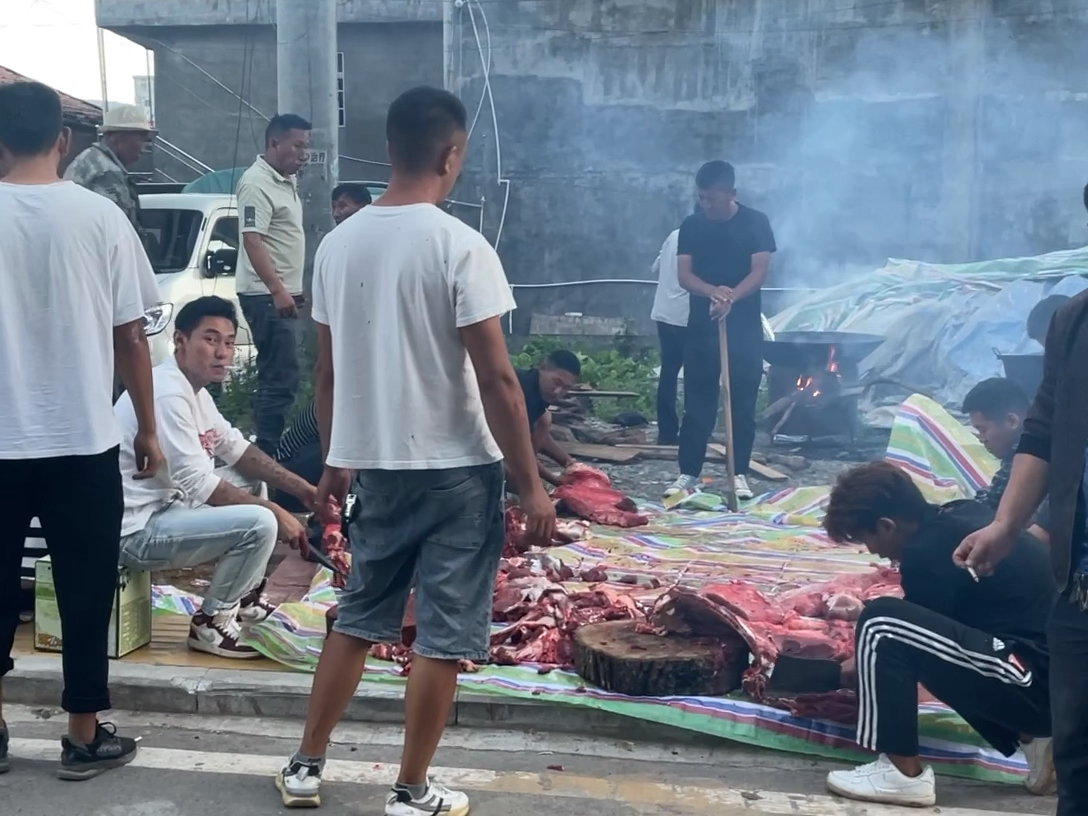
People doing butcheries for making Tuotuorou in Puxiong, Sichuan

Tuotuorou (Chinese: 坨坨肉; pinyin: tuótuóròu) is a dish of the Yi people of Sichuan, Yunnan, Guizhou, and Guangxi provinces of China. It is often served to guests in Yi households, along with buckwheat pancakes (known as mgefu or mgamo), garlic soup and unpeeled boiled potatoes. It consists of tender chunks of pork taken from young pigs of less than 15 kilograms (33 lb) in weight. This is seasoned with local herbs.

These are served in traditional Yi wooden dishes, and eaten with long-handled spoons instead of chopsticks.

== See also ==
- List of pork dishes
