= King rib =

British minced pork patty

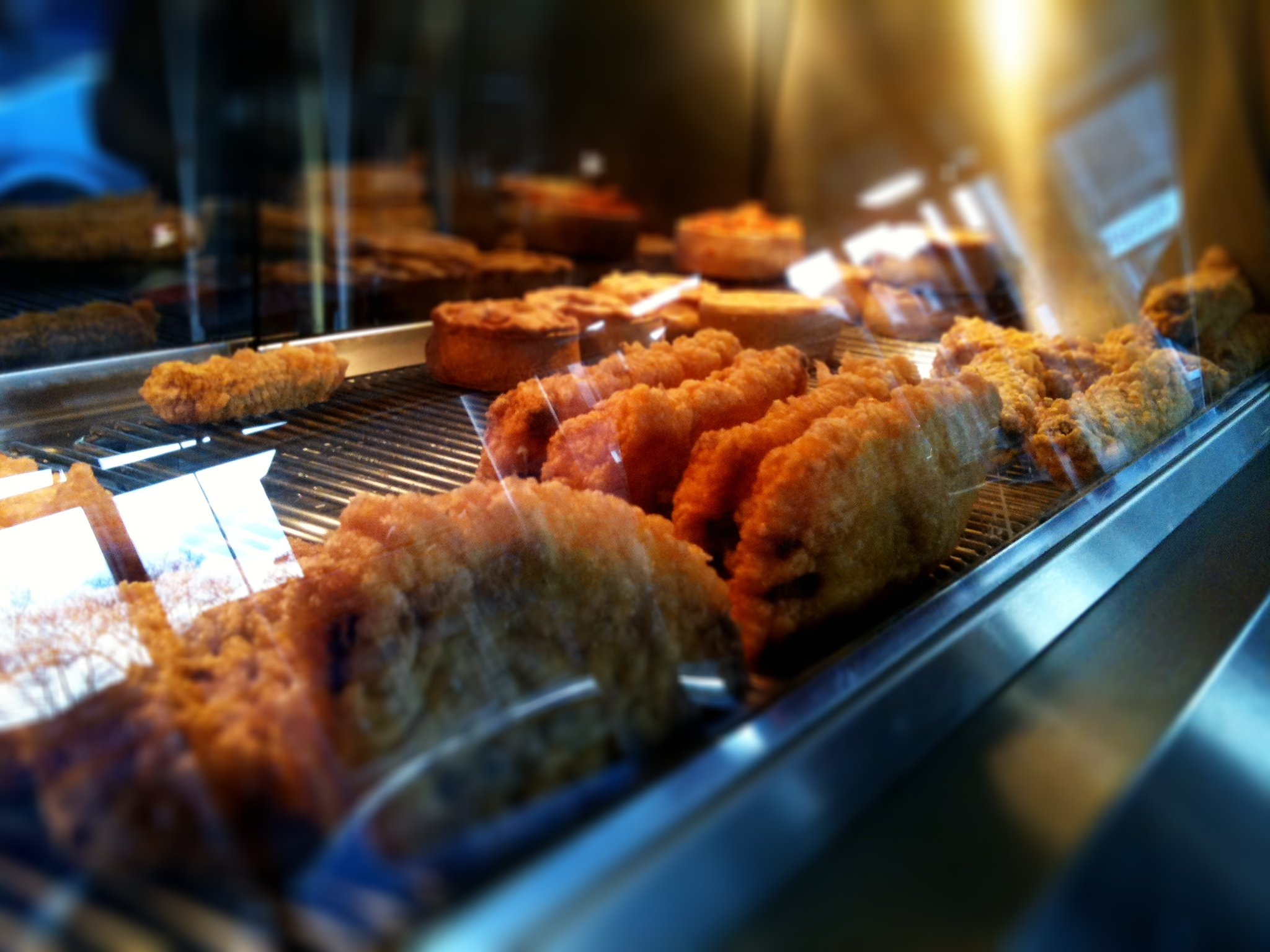
King rib

The king rib is an item of food commonly served in fish and chips shops in Scotland and Northern England. Despite its name, it is actually a sweetened patty of minced pork that is fried or deep-fried and often available as a "supper" combination meal, i.e. with chips. It is popular in Scotland to purchase a single king rib along with two buttered rolls, splitting the rib accordingly.

== See also ==
- List of deep fried foods
- List of pork dishes
