= List of Philippine dishes =

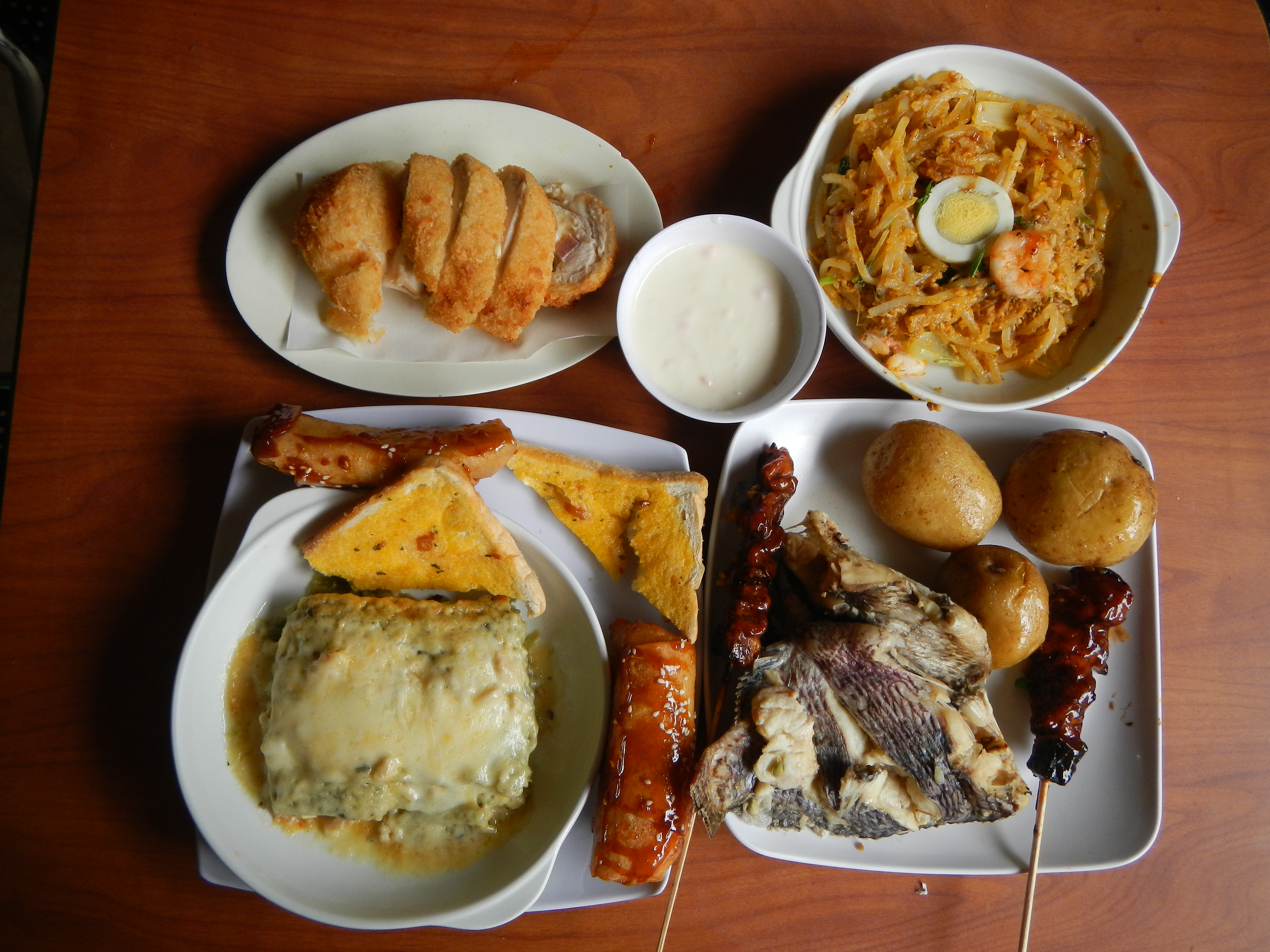
Filipino cuisine prepared at the Pulilan Municipal Hall in Bulacan

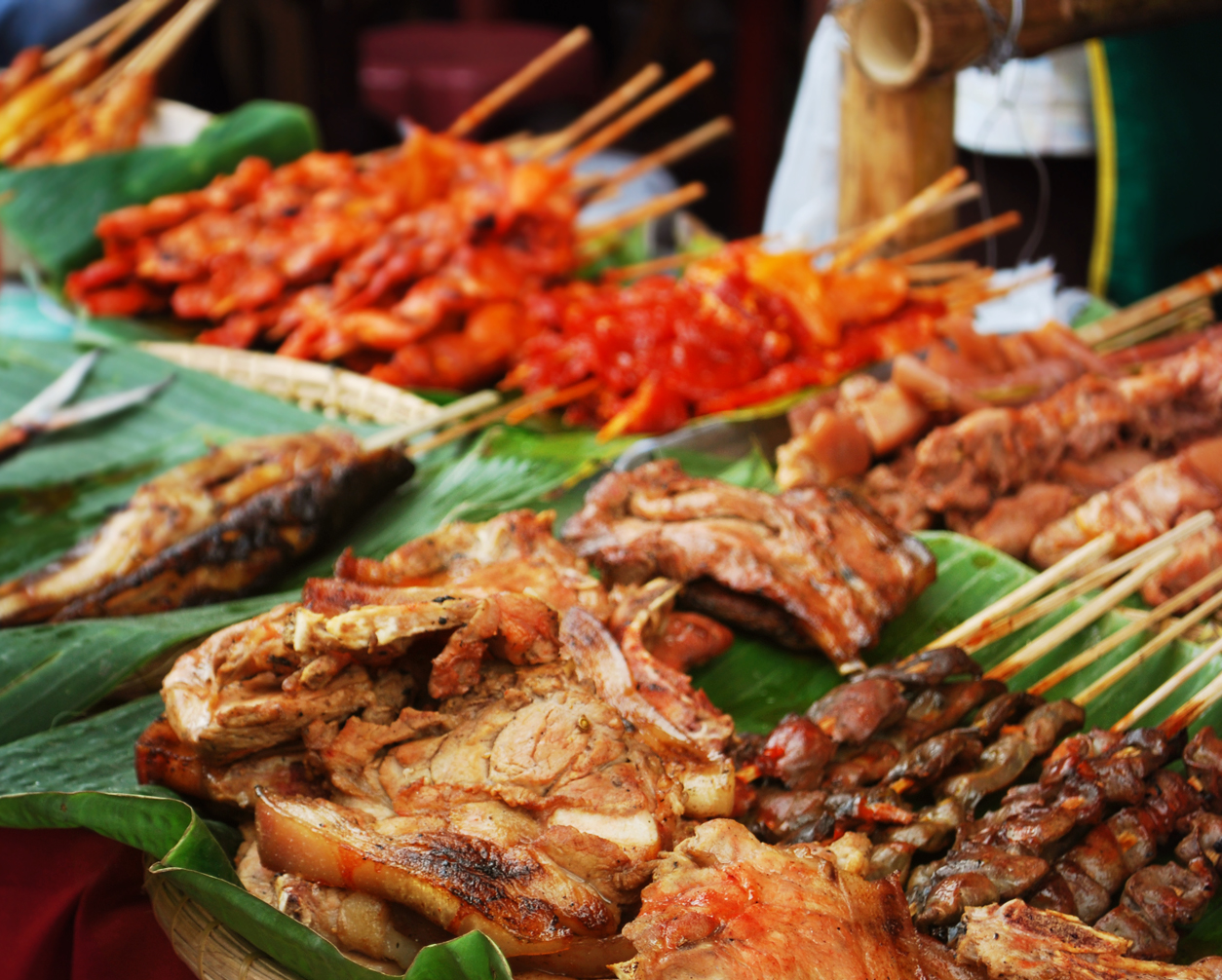
Barbecue and meat on display at a street food stall during the Dinagyang Festival in Iloilo City, Philippines

This is a list of selected dishes found in the Philippines. While the names of some dishes may be the same as those found in other cuisines, many of them have evolved to mean something distinctly different in the context of Filipino cuisine.

== Main dishes ==
Name	Image	Region	Type	Description
Adobo		Nationwide	Meat/Seafood/Vegetable dish	Typically pork or chicken, or a combination of both, is slowly cooked in vinegar, cooking oil, crushed garlic, bay leaf, black peppercorns, and soy sauce, and often browned in the oven or pan-fried afterward to get the desirable crisped edges.
Afritada		Tagalog	Meat dish	Chicken or pork and potatoes cooked in tomato sauce.
Barbecue (Inihaw, Inasal, Satti)		Nationwide		Philippine English term for Inihaw. Grilled or skewered meat (mainly pork or chicken) marinated in a sweet soy-garlic mixture, grilled, basted with the marinade and then served with either a soy-vinegar dip or a sweet brown sauce. Variants also use offal, such as isaw.
Bopis		Batangas	Meat dish	A spicy dish made out of pork lungs and heart sautéed in tomatoes, chilies and onions.
Camaron rebosado			Seafood	Deep fried battered shrimps. Similar to Tempura, but with a heavier batter.
Chicken pastel		Manila	Meat dish	Flavorful thick cream dish in cheese casserole. Cooked with Hotdog, Chorizo, Potatoes, Carrots and saute spices that complements with chicken.
Crispy pata		Nationwide	Meat dish	Deep fried portions of pork legs including knuckles often served with a chili and calamansi flavored dipping soy sauce or chili flavored vinegar for dipping.
Crispy tadyang ng baka			Meat dish	Crispy beef ribs often served with a chili and calamansi flavored soy sauce or chili flavored vinegar for dipping.
Curacha		Zamboanga	Seafood	Boiled or steamed sea crab.
Daing		Tagalog	Fish dish	Fish (especially milkfish) that has been dried, salted, or simply marinated in vinegar with much garlic and then fried.
Embutido			Meat dish	A meatloaf shaped in the form of a sausage, with eggs stuffed in the center.
Escabeche			Fish dish	Referring to both a dish of poached or fried fish that is marinated in an acidic mixture before serving, and to the marinade itself. Can refer broadly to sweet and sour dishes.
Giniling (Picadillo / Chili con Carne)		Tagalog	Meat Dish	Ground pork or beef cooked with garlic, onion, soy sauce, tomatoes, and potatoes and frequently with carrots, raisins, and bell peppers.
Halabos na hipon			Seafood	Shrimps steamed in their own juices and cooked with a little oil.
Hamonado			Meat dish	Also called endulsado in Zamboanga City. Pork cooked in a sweet sauce with pineapple juice and sugar. Tomato sauce is also sometimes added. It is named after the Spanish glazed ham (jamón and endulzado mean "ham" and "glazed" in Spanish, respectively). It is also the name of a type of sweet Philippine sausage noted for its ham-like taste.
Humba		Visayas Region	Meat dish	A Visayan slow-cooked sweet pork dish based on the Chinese dish Hong-ba (red-braised pork belly). It is similar to pork adobo and hamonado except that it characteristically uses fermented black soybeans (tausi).
Inasal na manok		Negros Occidental	Meat dish	Grilled chicken marinated in a vinegar marinade. Often served with a side of atchara and soy-vinegar dip, and with garlic rice and yellow atsuete oil.
Inihaw na liempo			Meat dish	Grilled pork belly.
Inun-unan		Visayas	Seafood	Visayan variant of fish paksiw. Fish cooked in a broth of vinegar, ginger, and other spices. Unlike northern paksiw na isda, it does not include vegetables.
Kadyos-Baboy-Langka		Iloilo	Meat dish	The name refers to the three main ingredients used in the dish: kadyos (pigeon peas), baboy (pork) and langka (jackfruit). The broth is soured with batwan, a fruit native to Southeast Asia.
Kadyos Manok Ubad		Iloilo, Negros Occidental	Meat dish	The name refers to the three main ingredients used in the dish: kadyos (pigeon peas), manok (chicken) and ubad (the edible inner layers of a banana stalk).
Kaldereta (Caldereta)		Luzon	Meat dish	A dish made with cuts of pork, beef or goat simmered in tomato paste or tomato sauce, with liver spread added to it.
Kinunot		Bicol	Seafood	From the word kunot which literally means shred. A dish made up of either shredded meat of pagi (stingray) or baby shark cooked in coconut milk with malunggay (moringa) leaves.
Kinilaw (Kilawin)		Nationwide	Seafood/Meat/Vegetable dish	A cooking process that relies on vinegar to denature the ingredients, similar to ceviche. Usually used to prepare raw seafood. It can also be used to prepare lightly cooked meat or vegetables.
Lechón		Nationwide	Meat dish	A dish made by roasting a whole pig over charcoal. It is often cooked during special occasions. A simpler version has chopped pieces of pork fried in a pan or wok (lechon kawali). A variant that is popular in the Visayas region is lechon de leche, which is a whole roasted suckling pig. Also refers to the manner of cooking, i.e., spitted and charcoal-roasted, for example, lechon manok (roasted chicken).
Lengua estofada			Meat dish	Braised ox tongue.
Lumpia		nationwide	Meat/Vegetable dish	A variant of spring rolls, either deep or pan fried (prito), or fresh (sariwa). Popular versions include lumpiang shanghai, a fairly narrow fried roll usually with a meat filling, often accompanied by a sweet chili dipping sauce, and lumpiang ubod, a wider, fresh spring roll filled with raw vegetables local to the area.
Mechado			Meat dish	Name derived from mitsa meaning "wick" which is what the pork fat inserted into a slab of beef looks like before the larded beef is cooked, sliced, and served in the seasoned tomato sauce it is cooked in.
Morcon			Meat dish	A beef roulade often prepared for special occasions it consists of thin sheets of cooked eggs and marinated beef layered one on top of the other, then wrapped and tied around carrots, celery, cheese, pork fat, and sausage. This is then cooked in seasoned tomato sauce.
Paksiw				Generally means to cook and simmer in vinegar. Common dishes bearing the term, however, can vary substantially depending on what is being cooked. Paksiw na isda is fish poached in a vinegar broth usually seasoned with fish sauce and spiced with siling mahaba and possibly containing vegetables. Paksiw na baboy is pork, usually hock or shank, cooked in ingredients similar to those in adobo but with the addition of sugar and banana blossoms to make it sweeter and water to keep the meat moist and to yield a rich sauce. Paksiw na lechon is roasted pork lechon meat cooked in lechon sauce or its component ingredients of vinegar, garlic, onions, black pepper and ground liver or liver spread and some water. The cooking reduces the sauce so that by the end the meat is almost being fried.
Palapa		Lanao del Sur, Lanao del Norte	Vegetable dish	A popular spicy Maranao condinment also served as an ulam with rice. Made of pounded sakurab, ginger, chillies and salt. After pounding into a rough mix the palapa is briefly fried to release its rich and spicy flavor. A variant mixed with grated coconut and turmeric is also made. Palapa is mostly used as a condiment alongside meat, chicken or fish, or is used in the main dish Piaparan, a famous dish of the Lanao region of Mindanao.
Pata tim			Meat dish	Braised pork leg dish similar to Paksiw na Pata, Chinese style. Simmered in a sweet soy sauce flavored by Chinese herbs such as star anise, banana blossoms, etc.
Piaparan		Lanao	Chicken, Fish or Vegetable dish	A popular spicy Maranao main dish made of palapa, grated coconut, bell peppers, poultry or fish, turmeric, chilli, and vegetables. Served with a soup made of the same ingredients and served over white rice.
Pinakbet		Ilocos	Vegetable dish	A popular Ilocano dish made of different vegetables like okra, eggplant and bitter gourd cooked in fish sauce.
Pinangat, Natong, or Laing		Bicol	Vegetable dish	In Bicol refers to a dish of taro leaves, chili, meat, and coconut milk tied securely with coconut leaf. In Manila the dish is known more commonly as laing. Pinangat or pangat also refers to a dish or method of cooking involving poaching fish in salted water and tomatoes.
Relleno				Stuffed meat, seafood, or vegetable dishes like rellenong bangus (stuffed milkfish), rellenong manok (stuffed chicken), and rellenong talong (stuffed eggplant) also known as tortang talong (see below).
Sarsiado		Tagalog	Fish dish	Fish that is cooked with tomato sauce and real tomatoes.
Sinanglay		Bicol	Fish	A dish wherein fish, preferably Tilapia, is wrapped in pechay or mustard leaves and is simmered in rich coconut milk.
Sisig		Pampanga	Meat/Fish dish	Fried and sizzled chopped bits of pig's head and liver, other versions using tuna or milkfish, usually seasoned with calamansi and chili peppers and sometimes topped with an egg.
Tapa			Meat dish	Dried, cured, or marinated sliced beef that is fried or grilled.
Torta		Nationwide	Egg and meat dish	A variation on an omelette, often referring to one made out of ground beef and potatoes. Other common variations include tortang alimasag, made with crab meat, and tortang talong, made with whole long eggplants roasted prior to adding the eggs.
Ukoy			Vegetable dish	Shrimp fritters often accompanied by vinegar as dipping sauce.

== Soups and stews ==
Name	Image	Region	Type	Description
Batchoy		Iloilo	Noodle soup	A noodle soup which originated in the district of La Paz, Iloilo City in the Philippines.
Bicol express		Popularized in the district of Malate, Manila	Stew	A stew made from long green chilies, coconut milk, alamang (shrimp paste) or daing (dried fish), onion, sliced or cubed pork meat, and garlic.
Bulalo		Batangas Negros Occidental	Soup/Stew	A deeply flavourful soup of beef shank, cabbage, and potatoes simmered for hours over low heat.
Callos			Stew	A hearty stew of chorizo, beef tripe in tomato sauce.
Dinengdeng		Ilocos	Soup	A bagoong soup based dish similar to pinakbet. It contains fewer vegetables and contains more bagoong soup base.
Dinuguan			Stew	A savory stew of meat simmered in a rich, thick spicy gravy of pig's blood, garlic, chili, and vinegar.
Ginataan		Tagalog	Soup/Stew	Food cooked with gata (coconut milk), with the literal translation of the word being, "cooked with coconut milk." It can refer to a number of different dishes, each called ginataan, but distinct from one another depending on their originating districts as well as the main protein. Ginataang hipon, for example, refers to shrimp cooked in coconut milk, ginataang gulay to an assortment of vegetables cooked in coconut milk, ginataang alimango is crabs cooked in coconut milk, while ginataang manok is chickens cooked in coconut milk . Coconut milk can also be added to existing dishes, as in ginataang adobo
Kare-kare		Tagalog	Stew	A meat, tripe, and oxtail stew with vegetables in peanut sauce customarily served with bagoong alamang (shrimp paste).
Lauya		Ilocos	Soup/Stew	A dish of pork, beef, or carabao meat in broth flavored with ginger, onions and fish sauce served as a soup or main entrée.
Mami			Soup	Generic term for noodle soup. Usually made of beef, chicken, pork.
Menudo		Ilocano	Stew	A stew of pork, pig liver, carrots and potatoes in tomato sauce.
Nilagang baka		Tagalog	Soup/Stew	A beef stew with cabbages, potatoes, and onion seasoned with fish sauce and black peppercorns usually using beef chuck or brisket. When using beef shank including the bone and marrow it is called nilagang bulalo.
Pancit Molo		Iloilo	Soup/Stew	A type of soup using wonton wrappers which originated from Molo district in Iloilo City.
Papaitan		Ilocos	Soup/Stew	A sour beef/goat innards soup. The bile or papait (undigested grass juice) is used as the primary souring agent.
Pares		Luzon	Stew	Filipino word for "Pair". A viand, usually beef asado, served with rice and a bowl of soup
Pochero			Stew	A beef/pork soup stew, usually nilagang baka, cooked with tomato sauce and pork and beans
Sinanglaw		Ilocos	Soup/Stew	A hotpot made from beef innards.
Sinigang		Tagalog	Soup/Stew	A sour soup/stew made with pork meat, beef or seafood, mixed with a variety of vegetables. Any sour fruit such as tamarind, unripe mango and pineapple is usually used as the souring agent.
Sopas		Tagalog	Noodle soup	Macaroni chicken soup. Usually contains chicken strips in broth, onions, vegetables (mainly carrots, cabbage and celery), in addition to macaroni noodles. It is cooked with evaporated milk to give it richer flavor.
Soup No. 5			Soup	A soup made from bull's testes or penis.
Tinola		Tagalog	Soup/Stew	A dish often made of chicken, although pork and fish can also be used, wedges of green papaya, and chili pepper leaves, in broth flavoured with ginger, onions and fish sauce served as a soup or main entrée. Tinolang isda goes well with kangkong (water spinach).

== Noodle dishes ==
Name	Image	Region	Type	Description
Pancit lomi		Batangas	Noodles	A Chinese-Filipino dish made with a variety of thick fresh egg noodles of about a quarter of an inch in diameter.
Misua			Noodles	A soup with misua (very thin flour noodles). Choice of protein can include: meatballs, canned tuna in tomato sauce, and chicken.
Pancit luglug		Rizal	Noodles	Similar to pancit palabok, except made with larger noodles. The name luglug comes from the sound made by the draining of the noodles.
Pancit canton		Tagalog	Noodles	Chinese-Filipino version of Cantonese lo mein using flour-based noodles.
Pancit bihon guisado		Luzon	Noodles	Stir-fried vermicelli noodles with vegetables and pork or chicken.
Pancit Tuguegarao or Batil-patong		Cagayan	Noodles	Pancit originating from the province of Cagayan
Pancit Malabon		Tagalog	Noodles	Another variant of Pancit Palabok which uses shrimp, squid, and other seafoods as toppings. The noodles are thicker than that of the Palabok and Luglug.
Pancit estacion		Cavite	Noodles	This is a type of pancit, or stir-fried rice noodle dish, which originated in Tanza, Cavite. Its main ingredient is mung bean sprouts (used as a substitute for rice noodles). Its sauce includes corn starch, atsuete, tinapa and kamias.
Pancit palabok		Tagalog	Noodles	Rice noodles cooked in anato seeds, usually served with hard-boiled egg, chicharon, spring onions, and kalamansi
Filipino spaghetti		Tagalog	Noodles	Filipino version of spaghetti with a tomato (or sometimes banana ketchup) and meat sauce characterized by its sweetness and use of hotdogs or sausages.
Sotanghon			Noodles	A clear chicken soup with vermicelli noodles (sotanghon).

== Vegetables ==
Name	Image	Region	Type	Description
Ginisang monggo		Nationwide	Vegetable	Sauteed mung / mongo beans in onions and tomatoes. Variants can include the addition of coconut milk, dried fish, chicken, thinly sliced pork, or vegetables such as kangkong (water spinach), langka (jackfruit), and malunggay (moringa).
Kinilnat		La Union		An Ilocano salad made with leaves, shoots, blossoms, or the other parts of the plant are boiled and drained and dressed with bagoong (preferably) or patis, and sometimes souring agents like calamansi or cherry tomatoes are added as well as freshly ground ginger.
Laswa		Visayan		A popular soupy Visayan dish made of different vegetables, including okra, eggplant, malunggay, alugbati, squash, and taro root, yard long beans, tomatoes, served over rice.

== Rice ==
Name	Image	Region	Type	Description
Arroz a la valenciana		Visayas	Glutinous rice	A hearty, glutinous rice dish that incorporates various ingredients, such as chorizo de bilbao, carrots, raisins, pork, chicken, bell peppers, garlic and onions. Turmeric is used to give the bright yellow colour characteristic of the dish. It is often garnished with sliced hard boiled eggs.
Arroz Caldo		Luzon	Rice porridge	Arroz Caldo is a hearty simple meal, commonly eaten when sick for better digestion or when the weather is quite cold. It is composed of various ingredients, including uncooked rice or leftover rice, garlic, onion, ginger, and boiled eggs. Its key difference from other porridge is the use of ginger slices, which gives that distinct aroma and kick of spice.
Lugaw			Porridge	Plain rice porridge. Not to be confused with Arroz Caldo, which contains chicken.
Champorado			Porridge	A sweet chocolate rice porridge. It can be served hot or cold and with milk and sugar to taste. It is served usually at breakfast and sometimes together with dried fish locally known as tuyo.
Paelya			Rice	A complex rice dish frequently involving seafood such as shrimps (hipon) and mussels (tahong) taken from Spanish cuisine that is mostly prepared during special occasions.
Sinangag			Rice	Fried rice sauteed in garlic. A vital part of the "silog" meal ("Sinangag at Itlog"; trans: "fried rice and egg").
Silog		Tagalog	Rice	Refers to the combination of sinangag (fried rice), itlog (egg) and meats. The name of the meats are then suffixed to the word silog, turning meats such as tapa and longganisa into tapsilog and longsilog, It is also served with other viands such as Tocino (Tocilog), Hotdog (Hotsilog), and Bangus (milkfish) (bangsilog).

== Preserved meat and fish ==
Name	Image	Region	Type	Description
Longganisa		Cebu	Sausage	A pork sausage similar to a chorizo. It has its own regional variants such as Longganisang Ilocano and Longganisang Lucban of the Ilocos Province and of the City of Lucban, Quezon, respectively, that is made with much garlic, and Sweet Chorizo of Cebu which is similar to sausages but with a sweeter flavor.
Tinapa / Tuyo		Davao		Fish preserved through the process of smoking (tinapa) or drying (tuyo).
Tocino		Pampanga		A cured meat product native to the Philippines. It is usually made out of pork although beef is also used and is cured using sugar which gives it its "ham-like" glaze.

== Pickles and side dishes ==
Name	Image	Region	Type	Description
Atchara			Pickle	Refers primarily to unripe papaya in a pickling solution of sugar and vinegar. It also refers to other vegetables pickled in the same manner.
Burong mangga			Pickle	A food made by mixing sugar, salt, and water to unripened mangoes that have previously been salted.
Ensaladang talong			Salad	A salad with boiled/grilled eggplant as the primary ingredient. It can be served as is, in a pickling solution of vinegar and garlic or with tomatoes, onions and bagoong alamang.

== Miscellaneous and street food ==
Name	Image	Region	Type	Description
Balut		Central Luzon		A fertilized duck (or chicken) egg with a nearly developed embryo inside that is boiled, shelled, and eaten as is or dipped in salt or spicy vinegar.
Binalot				Literally "wrapped". Food wrapped in banana leaves. Usually a meal consisting of a smoked or fried viand and rice sometimes accompanied by a salted egg, tomatoes, or atchara.
Chicharon		Bulacan	Snack	Primarily refers to fried pork rinds. It is also made from chicken, mutton, beef, fish and fish skin and innards.
Fishballs				A common street food most often made from the meat of cuttlefish or pollock and served with a sweet and spicy sauce or with a thick dark brown sweet and sour sauce.
Isaw				A street food made from barbecued pig or chicken intestines. Another variant is deep-fried breaded chicken intestine.
Patupat (or Pusô)				A type of rice cake from South East Asia made from rice that has been wrapped in a woven palm leaf pouch or banana leaves, then boiled.
Pinikpikan		Cordillera		A chicken dish wherein the chicken is beaten to death, dressed and roasted whole on a spit. Pinikpik means "beaten (with a hard object)", which is done to infuse the chicken meat with blood.
Siomai				Ground pork, beef, and shrimp, among others, combined with extenders like green peas, carrots and the like which is then wrapped in wonton wrappers.
Siopao				Steamed filled bun. Common versions are asado, shredded meat in a sweet sauce similar to a Chinese barbecued pork filling, and bola-bola, a packed ground pork filling.
Tokneneng and Kwek kwek				A tempura-like Filipino street food of duck or quail eggs covered in an orange-dyed batter and then deep-fried. Tokneneng uses duck eggs while the smaller kwek kwek use quail eggs.
Tokwa at baboy				A bean curd (tokwa is Filipino for tofu, from Lan-nang) and pork dish. Usually serving as an appetizer or for pulutan. Also served with Lugaw. It is a type of kinilaw.

== Bread and pastries ==
Name	Image	Region	Type	Description
Araro		Palawan	Cookies	Cookies made of flour, egg, sugar and salt
Binaki (Pintos)		Bukidnon, Mindanao; Bogo, Cebu	Tamales	Steamed corn sweet tamales
Binangkal		Visayas and Mindanao	Fried dough	Hard and crunchy fried flour balls covered in sesame seeds. Not to be confused with buchi, which is hollow and chewy on the inside.
Biskotso		Iloilo	Bread	Baked bread topped with butter and sugar, or garlic
Buko Roll		Tuguegarao	Bread	Baked bread filled with coconut and condensed milk
Buchi			Fried dough	A local version of the Chinese sesame seed balls (jin deui). Variants can range from almost exactly the same as the Chinese version, to versions which do not use sesame seeds and are filled with local fillings like ube or bukayo. Also spelled butsi.
Crema de fruta			Cake	A layered dessert made with sponge cake, custard, gelatin, and fresh or preserved fruits
Empanada			Pastry	A baked or fried stuffed bread or pastry. They usually contain ground beef, pork or chicken, potatoes, chopped onions, and raisins.
Ensaymada			Pastry	A pastry or a brioche made with butter (instead of lard) and topped with grated cheese (usually queso de bola, the local name for aged Edam) and sugar.
Mango float			Cake	An icebox cake variant of crema de fruta made with graham crackers, whipped cream, and fresh mangoes
Pan de coco			Bread	A rich sweet bread with a sweet coconut filling.
Pandesal			Bread	This is a common bread roll in the Philippines. It is made of flour, yeast, sugar, oil, and salt.
Pastel de Camiguín				Or simply pastel, is a Filipino soft bun with yema (custard) filling originating from the province of Camiguin. The name is derived from Spanish pastel ("cake"). In addition to the original yema filling, pastel also feature other fillings, including ube, mocha, macapuno, cheese, chocolate, durian, jackfruit, and mango, among others. Pastel is regarded as a pasalubong (regional specialty gifts) of Camiguin Island and nearby Cagayan de Oro City.
Polvorón				A pastry made from compressed toasted flour, milk, and sugar. Sometimes made with ground peanuts, cashews or pinipig. May be coated with milk or milk chocolate.
Roscas		Barugo and Carigara, Leyte	Pastry cookies	A pastry cookie made from lard, anise, flour, sugar, salt, butter, yeast, seasonings, and egg yolks, as well as tuba as its liqueur component.
Rosquillos		Cebu	Cookies	Filipino cookies made from flour, eggs, shortening, sugar, and baking powder. Its name comes from the Spanish word rosca (ringlet). Not to be confused with Spanish rosquillos or roscos which are more akin to small doughnuts.
Shakoy		Visayas	Fried dough	A traditional doughnut variant from the Visayas islands with a distinctive twisted shape. Also known as siyakoy or lubid-lubid.
Otap		Cebu	Pastry	Variant spelling: otap. Oval-shaped puff pastry usually made with flour, shortening, coconut, and sugar.

== Sweets ==
Name	Image	Region	Type	Description
Apas		Tagalog		Oblong-shaped biscuits that are topped with sugar.
Banana cue		Tagalog		Deep fried Saba bananas coated in caramelised brown sugar.
Barquillos		Iloilo/Negros Occidental		A flat, sweet flour-based pastry rolled into a hollow tube. Sometimes eaten with sorbetes or western ice cream.
Barquiron		Negros Occidental		Barquillos filled with polvoron.
Baye baye		Negros Occidental		A sticky dessert made from newly harvested rice.
Belekoy		Bulacan		A sweet pastry made from flour, sugar, sesame seeds, and vanilla.
Bibingka		Luzon		A type of cake made with rice flour, sugar, clarified butter, and coconut milk. Baked with coals from above and under, it is usually topped with butter, salted duck egg, muscovado sugar, grated cheese and desiccated coconut.
Binignit		Luzon		A dessert soup made with coconut milk, tubers such as purple yam, sweet potato, and plantains as well as jackfruit, sago and tapioca pearls.
Biko		Nationwide		A sticky sweet delicacy made from glutinous rice, coconut milk, and brown sugar. It is similar to Kalamay, but uses whole grains. It is also known as Sinukmani or Sinukmaneng.
Bukayo		Luzon		A sweet popular with children, it is made by simmering strips of young, gelatinous coconut (buko) in water and then mixing these with sugar.
Buko pie				A traditional pastry, young coconut filled pie.
Camote cue		Tagalog		Deep fried kamote with caramelised brown sugar.
Cascaron		Negros Occidental		A dessert made of rice flour, coconut and sugar.
Coconut jam				A food spread, a custard jam in the general sense, consumed mainly in Southeast Asia and made from a base of coconut and sugar.
Leche flan				A rich custard made of egg yolks with a layer of soft caramel on top (as opposed to crème brûlée, which has a hard caramel top). Sometimes sliced and added to other desserts such as halo-halo.
Dodol		Ilocos and Lanao		A toffee-like food delicacy made with coconut milk, jaggery, and rice flour. Sticky, thick and sweet, it is served mostly during festivals such as Eid-ul-Fitr and Eid-ul-Adha.
Espasol		Laguna		A cylindrical cake made of rice flour cooked in coconut milk and sweetened coconut strips, which is then dusted with toasted rice flour.
Ginanggang		Mindanao		Grilled skewered Saba bananas brushed with margarine and sprinkled with sugar.
Halo-halo		Luzon		A popular dessert that is a mixture of shaved ice and milk to which are added various boiled sweet beans and fruits, and served cold in a tall glass or bowl.
Hopia				A popular bean filled pastry originally introduced by Fujianese immigrants in urban centres of the Philippines.
Kalamay		Tagalog		A sticky sweet delicacy made of ground glutinous rice, grated coconut, brown sugar, margarine, peanut butter, and vanilla (optional).
Kutsinta		Tagalog		Rice cake with jelly-like consistency made from rice flour, brown sugar, lye and food coloring, usually topped with freshly grated mature coconut
Latik		Luzon		Latík in the northern Philippines refers to coconut milk curds used as toppings. In the Visayan regions, it refers to a thick, sweet syrup made from coconut milk and sugar.
Maíz con hielo / (mais con yelo)				Similar to halo-halo, but instead made with corn kernels and sometimes with corn flakes as topping.
Maja blanca				A local variant of blancmange made of coconut milk and corn starch. May include sweet corn kernels.
Maruya				Fritters usually made from Saba bananas.
Morón		Leyte	dessert, snack	Like most suman, the morón is made from glutinous rice, but is smoothened and then either striped or divided into two flavor parts, one part being flavored with chocolate from the local cacao and the other part with coconut milk
Nata de coco				It is a kind of gelatinous and translucent dessert typical of Philippine cuisine. This dessert is very typical in the provinces of La Laguna and Quezon. It is a food fermented by the action of a bacterium (Leuconostoc mesenteroides) that feeds on the existing disaccharides in certain fruits: mainly coconut in conjunction with carrageenan. The name of this dessert is literally what it sounds like in Spanish.
Palitaw		Luzon		They are made from malagkít (sticky rice) washed, soaked, and then ground. Scoops of the batter are dropped into boiling water where they float to the surface as flat discs which are then dipped in grated coconut and presented with a separate dip of sugar and toasted sesame seeds.
Piaya		Negros Occidental	Snack	A flat pastry filled with a jam made of muscovado sugar and sometimes sprinkled with sesame seeds, grilled on a pan. Different flavours include ube (purple yam), mango and chocolate.
Puto		Luzon		Small white buns baked from rice flour. Variations include ube and pandan flavours, as well as toppings like cheese and salted duck egg. Sometimes used to accompany other dishes, usually dinuguan (black pudding stew).
Sapin-sapin		Tagalog		A layered glutinous rice and coconut dessert. Takes its name from the word sapin, "to spread" or "to cover".
Sikwate and Puto Maya		Lanao Del Norte		A combination of local hot chocolate and steamed glutinous rice usually served with "muscovado" sugar and ripe mango. Isa Sweet Tooth, a well known dessert specialist, is one of the well known maker of this unique sweet in the region.
Sorbetes / Dirty ice cream				Traditional Filipino ice cream. Usually peddled by a sorbetero from a brightly coloured pushcart, it is sometimes made with coconut milk or rarely carabao milk. Typical flavours include ube, cheese, cookies and cream, avocado, strawberry, Chocnut (a popular crumbly chocolate and peanut sweet), and melon. Sorbetes is can be served on a cone, in a cup, or on bread such as pan de sal or hotdog buns.
Suman / rice cake / balatong		Tagalog		Sticky rice steamed in banana leaf. Topped with a traditional brown sauce or sugar.
Taho				Made with fresh tofu, arnibal (a brown sugar and vanilla syrup), and sago pearls. Usually sold in the morning by a hawker known as a magtatahô and can be eaten as a breakfast. May be served either hot (straight from the magtatahô) or sometimes it can be purchased chilled. Probably developed from the Chinese treat douhua.
Turon		Luzon		A typical Philippine snack consisting of a banana or plaintain and maybe jackfruit wrapped in a springroll wrapper then deep fried and sprinkled with sugar.
Ube halaya		Luzon		Ube jam, made from boiled and mashed purple yam. Ube halaya (Or halayang ube; variant spellings halea, haleya; from the Spanish jalea, "jam") is also used in pastries and other desserts such as halo-halo and ice cream.
Ube ice cream		Luzon		An ice cream made out of mashed ube, milk, sugar and crushed ice. It is then mixed using an ice cream mixer

== Sauces and condiments ==
Name	Image	Region	Type	Description
Alamang (Shrimp paste) / Bagoong	© BrokenSphere / Wikimedia Commons			Shrimp paste made from minute shrimp or krill. It is typically combined with unripe mango / Mangga (Philippine Mango).
Bagoong monamon		Pangasinan		A common ingredient used in the Philippines and particularly in Northern Ilocano cuisine. It is made by fermenting salted anchovies.
Bagoong terong				It is made by salting and fermenting the bonnet mouth fish. This bagoong is coarser than Bagoong monamon, and contains fragments of the salted and fermented fish.
Banana ketchup		Luzon		A prepared condiment made from banana fruit mashed, with sugar, vinegar, and spices, and colored with red food coloring.
Lechon sauce				Also known as liver sauce or breadcrumb sauce made out of ground liver or liver pâté, vinegar, sugar, and spices. A sweet, tangy light-brown sauce used in roasts and the pork dish called lechon
Oyster sauce				Describes a number of sauces made by cooking oysters. The most common in modern use is a viscous dark brown condiment made from oyster extracts, sugar, salt and water thickened with corn starch. Some versions may be darkened with caramel, though high-quality oyster sauce is naturally dark
Patis (Fish sauce)				Sometimes spiced with labuyo peppers, or kalamansi lime juice
Peanut sauce				Peanut sauce is used with meat and vegetables, adding flavor to grilled skewered meat, such as satays, poured over vegetables as salad dressing such as in gado-gado, or as a dipping sauce.
Tultul		Guimaras		A type of rock salt.
Suka (Vinegar)				This is an aqueous solution of acetic acid and trace compounds that may include flavorings. Vinegar typically contains 5–8% acetic acid by volume. Usually, the acetic acid is produced by a double fermentation, converting simple sugars to ethanol using yeast, and ethanol to acetic acid by acetic acid bacteria.
Toyo (Soy sauce)				This is a liquid condiment of Chinese origin, traditionally made from a fermented paste of soybeans, roasted grain, brine, and Aspergillus oryzae or Aspergillus sojae molds. It is considered to contain a strong umami flavor.

== Drinks ==
Name	Image	Region	Type	Description
Basi		Ilocos	Alcoholic beverage	Made from sugar cane. If fermented longer, it turns into suka or vinegar.
Buko juice		Nationwide	Coconut water	Coconut water. The water inside a coconut.
Tapuy (rice wine)		Banaue, Mountain Province	Alcoholic beverage	An alcoholic rice drink made of glutinous rice. It is a clear full-bodied wine with a strong alcoholic flavor, moderately sweet and often leaves a lingering taste.
Lambanog		Southern Tagalog (Batangas, Laguna and Quezon Province)	Alcoholic beverage	Wine made of nipa palm or coconut. Sometimes known in Asia as arrack or coconut vodka.

== Ingredients ==
Name	Image	Region	Type	Description
Atsuete (Annatto seeds)				Frequently used as a food coloring in dishes like kare-kare and Agno Longanisa.
Ampalaya (Bitter melon)			Vegetable	
Bangus (Milkfish)		Pangasinan	Fish	Generally considered the national fish of the Philippines. Popular dishes include daing na bangus, rellenong bangus, and sinigang na bangus.
Batuan			Fruit	
Bawang (Garlic)			Vegetable	
Bayabas (Guava)			Fruit	
Bay leaf (Dahon ng Laurel)			Spice	Referred to as "dahong paminta" (literally 'spice leaf') or "dahong laurel"
Bulaklak ng saging (Banana blossoms)			Flavoring	Used as an ingredient in kare-kare
Calabaza (Regional var.: Squash / Calabash / Kalabasa / Pumpkin)			Vegetable	
Calamansi / Kalamansi (Philippine lemon)			Fruit	Used in various condiments, beverages, dishes, marinades, and preserves.
Gabi (Taro corm)			Root crop	
Gata (Coconut milk)				
Glutinous rice			Grain	
Gulaman				An edible thickening agent used to make jellies, flan, or desserts derived from dried seaweed.
Kanin (Rice)			Grain	Called bigas when uncooked and kanin when cooked.
Kalamansi (Calamondin)			Fruit	
Kamote (Sweet potato)			Root crop	
Kamoteng Kahoy (Cassava)				
Kamatis (Tomato)			Fruit	
Kangkong (Water spinach)			Vegetable	A semi-aquatic tropical plant grown as a leaf vegetable.
Kesong puti or Kasilyo		Cavite, Laguna, Bulacan, Samar, and Cebu	Cheese	A soft, white cheese, made from unskimmed carabao's milk, salt, and rennet.
Katuray			Flower	
Kinampay		Bohol		A specific variety of ube which is found mostly in Bohol, Philippines.
Kundol (Winter melon)			Vegetable	
Labanos (white radish)			Vegetable	
Lapu-lapu (Grouper)			Fish	
Luya (Ginger)			Spice	
Malunggay (Moringa)			Vegetable	
Mangga (Mango)			Fruit	Generally considered the national fruit of the Philippines. Frequently eaten ripe as it is or when unripe with bagoong or used as an ingredient in dishes.
Monggo (Mung bean)			Bean	
Okra			Vegetable	
Paminta (Black pepper)			Spice	Sometimes referred to as "butong paminta" (literally 'seed spice') to distinguish it from bay leaves ("dahong paminta")
Patola (Luffa)			Vegetable	
Pechay (Chinese cabbage)			Vegetable	
Pechay wombok (Napa cabbage)			Vegetable	
Pili Nut			Nut	A type of nut belonging to the genus Canarium. Mostly used in desserts, the edible nut is cultivated only in the Philippines.
Puso ng saging (Banana heart)				
Repolyo (Cabbage)			Vegetable	
Saba			Berry	A short wide plaintain that is often used in cooking. The other two kinds of saging (bananas) common in local markets are the dessert cultivars latundan and lakatan.
Sayote (Chayote)			Vegetable	
Sibuyas (Onion)			Spice	
Siling labuyo			Spice	Bird's eye chili, one of the hottest chili varieties.
Siling mahaba		Tagalog Americano Bangset	Spice	
Singkamas (Jícama)			Root crop	Sometimes eaten raw and dipped in salt.
Sitaw (Yardlong bean)			Bean	
Sitsaro (Snow peas)			Pea	
Tabon-tabon			Fruit	A type of fruit used as souring agent and antiseptic in local dishes especially Kinilaw. Records show that ancient Filipinos used this already as an ingredient predating Spanish colonization.
Talong (Eggplant)			Fruit	
Tausi (Fermented black beans)			Bean	Usually sold in cans.
Tilapia			Fish	
Tofu				Usually dried tofu or tokwa. Sometimes added as an optional ingredient in some vegetable dishes. Silken tofu is usually associated with the snack or dessert taho (see above) which sees it mixed with a sweet syrup.
Togue (Bean sprouts)				
Ube (Purple yam)			Root crop	
Wansoy (Coriander leaf or cilantro)				

== See also ==
- Kapampangan cuisine
- List of Philippine desserts
- Philippine condiments
