= Pasalubong =

Filipino traditional gift

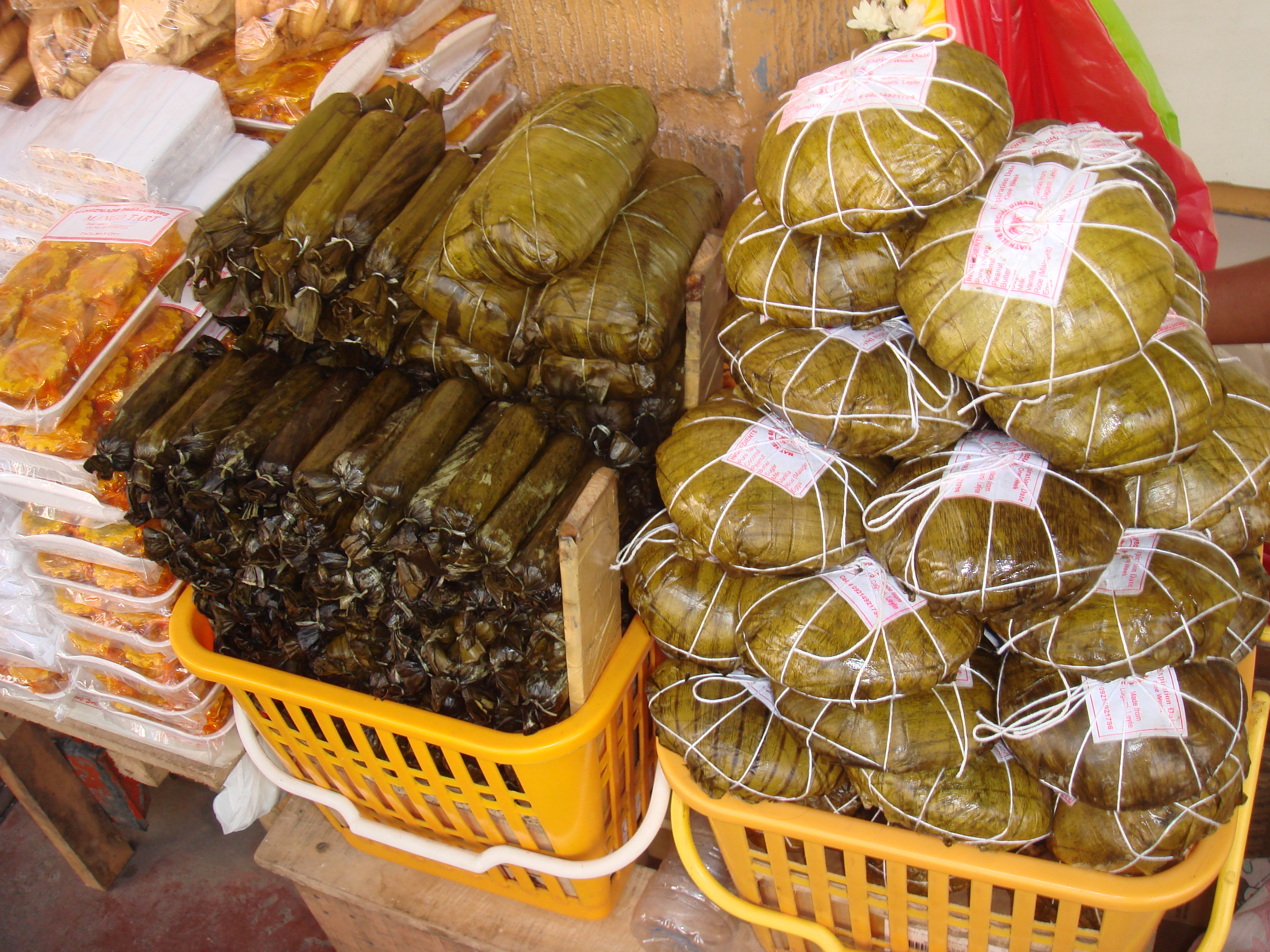
Regional delicacies sold as pasalubong in Tacloban City. Left to right: moron, sagmani, and binagol.

Pasalubong (Tagalog, "[something] for when you welcome me") are homecoming gifts brought for family, friends or neighbors in the Filipino tradition of bringing home gifts from a travel destination. A pasalubong can be any gift or souvenir, and is usually given by the traveller upon arriving home.

Pasalubong are also associated with the balikbayan, Overseas Filipinos returning to the Philippines, and may refer to items that migrant workers bring home to their families, friends, relatives or even non-relatives that they feel especially close with.

== Description ==
Pasalubong is a Tagalog word, a variant of the word pansalubong or pangsalubong. It comes from the root word "salubong" which means "(to) welcome", "to meet", or "reception". The prefix "pa-" is a contraction of "pang-", roughly equivalent to the English suffix "-er". Thus, the word "pasalubong" can be roughly translated as "welcomer", or "something meant for you when you welcome me back." The word has minor celebratory connotations, as in rejoicing the safe homecoming of someone who was away for a time.

In Visayan languages, pasalubong is also referred to as tinabuan in Cebuano and sinugatan in Hiligaynon. Both of which have the same meanings as the Tagalog word. The Philippine English acronym B.H. (for "Bring Home") is also frequently used.

Pasalubong, in general, is a "gift for a relation or friend brought by a traveler returning from a trip", and could also refer to "anything given as a gift to someone on the way home to a certain place." It could also mean "homecoming gift" or any present which signifies appreciation to the services rendered by the recipient.

The pasalubong usually consists of native delicacies or indigenous things from the region or country where the traveler came from. For example, a vacationer coming back from Negros might bring home some piaya to his family, while someone coming home from Hawaii might bring macadamia nuts. The length of time the person is away is inconsequential. A pasalubong can be given coming home from work each day to returning to one's hometown after decades of being in another country.

== Cultural significance ==
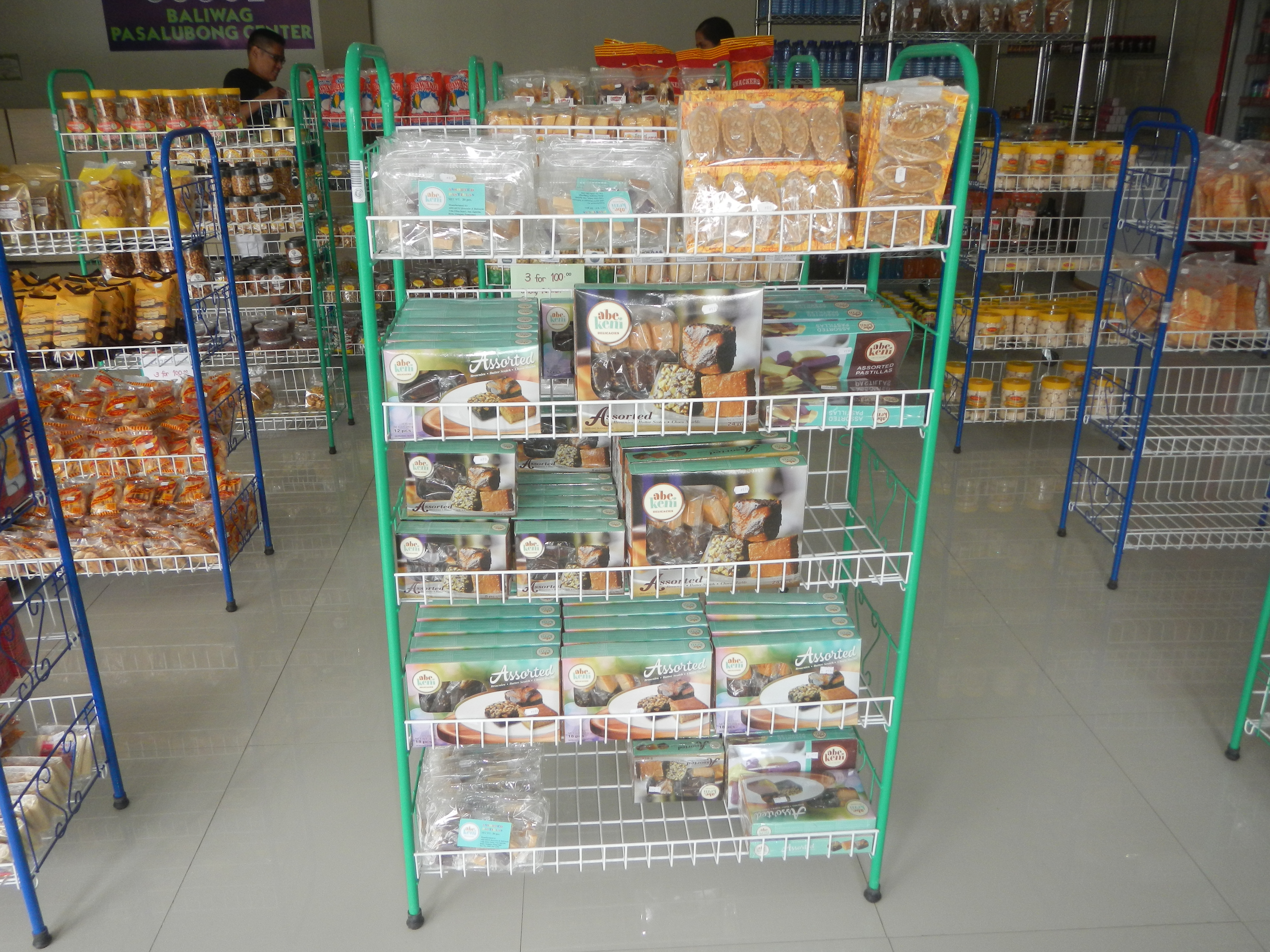
Various items sold at the Baliuag Pasalubong Center in Baliuag, Bulacan

The tradition of giving a pasalubong is of great cultural importance for Filipinos as it strengthens the bond with the immediate family, relatives, and friends. In rarer instances, it can even be used to forge stronger relationships with someone you may not know that well, as with someone you may be meeting for the first time.

The gesture of handing out pasalubong emphasizes the gladness at reuniting with one's loved ones and the relief at being back home safe. It is also a sign of thoughtfulness. While pasalubong are not compulsory or even expected, failing to bring pasalubong for someone can sometimes be perceived negatively. Particular importance is given to gifts for children, and the anticipation of getting pasalubong from a parent coming home is often a cherished childhood memory for most Filipinos.

By bringing gifts with regional significance (e.g. things that cannot be acquired locally), the person coming home can also share part of his travels. It similar to the western concept of souvenirs except that it is not meant for personal remembrance but for sharing the experience with others, especially as the different islands and regions of the Philippines can have different languages, local customs, and cuisine specialties. The pasalubong serves as a 'sample' of another region's specialty, bringing different Filipino cultures closer together. They can also simply be gifts likely to be appreciated.

Unlike western gifts, pasalubong are not wrapped, but are given as is. The person who gives the pasalubong can also freely partake of the gift.

== Typical pasalubong ==
Various regions in the Philippines have their own specialties in food, handicrafts, and the like. These are promoted to local tourists via the pasalubong custom. It is not unusual for bus stops to have stalls nearby which sell the specialty pasalubong of the respective regions they are located in.

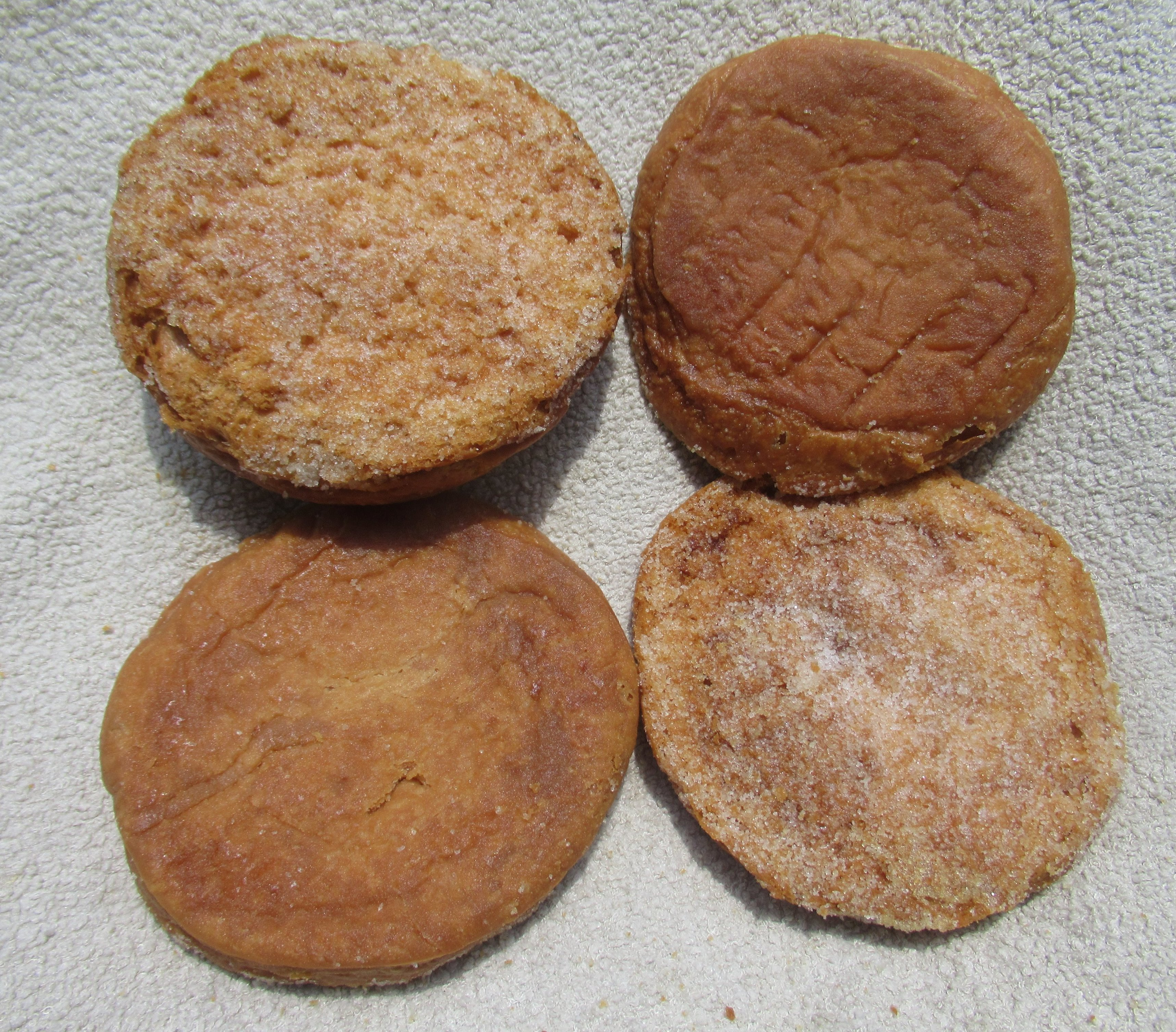
"Mamón Tostado"

They don't always have to be regionally significant, however. Pasalubong can range from ordinary sweets (like chocolates), regional delicacies, to imported confectionery goods. They can also be other items like clothing, accessories, novelty items, ornaments, handicraft items, artwork, and toys, among others. They can even be ordinary things that may be hard to acquire in a given region.

Pasalubong can be as mundane as fast-food take-outs, toys, snacks or fruit given to children below 10 years of age by a parent coming home from work. It can also be as exotic as a balikbayan box filled with gifts from a foreign country; it is an adaptation of the idea of the pasalubong for the Filipino diaspora. Unlike traditional pasalubong, these are not usually given in person but are sent by air freight.

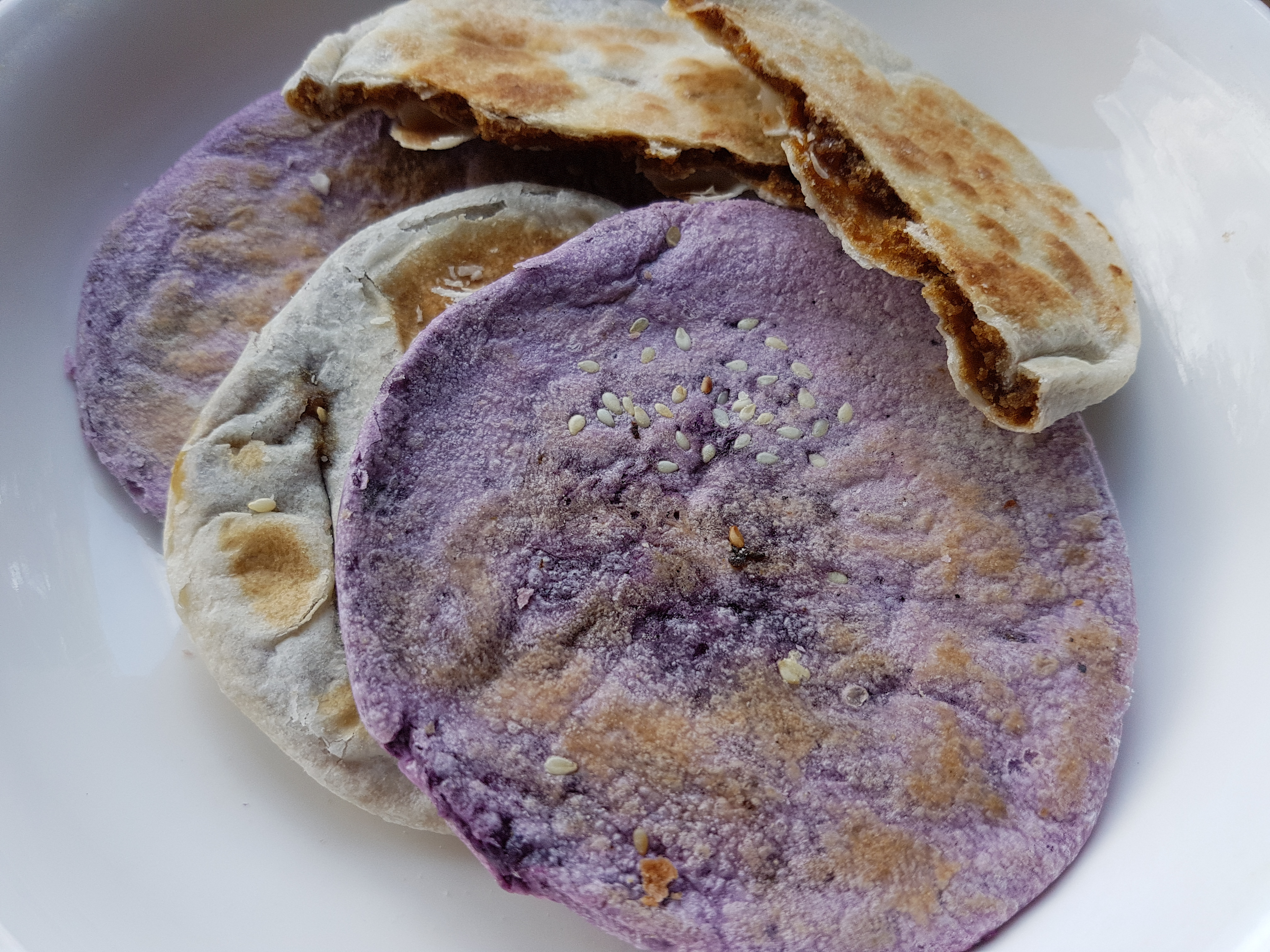
Piaya, one of the typical pasalubong from Bacolod

== List of pasalubong by region ==
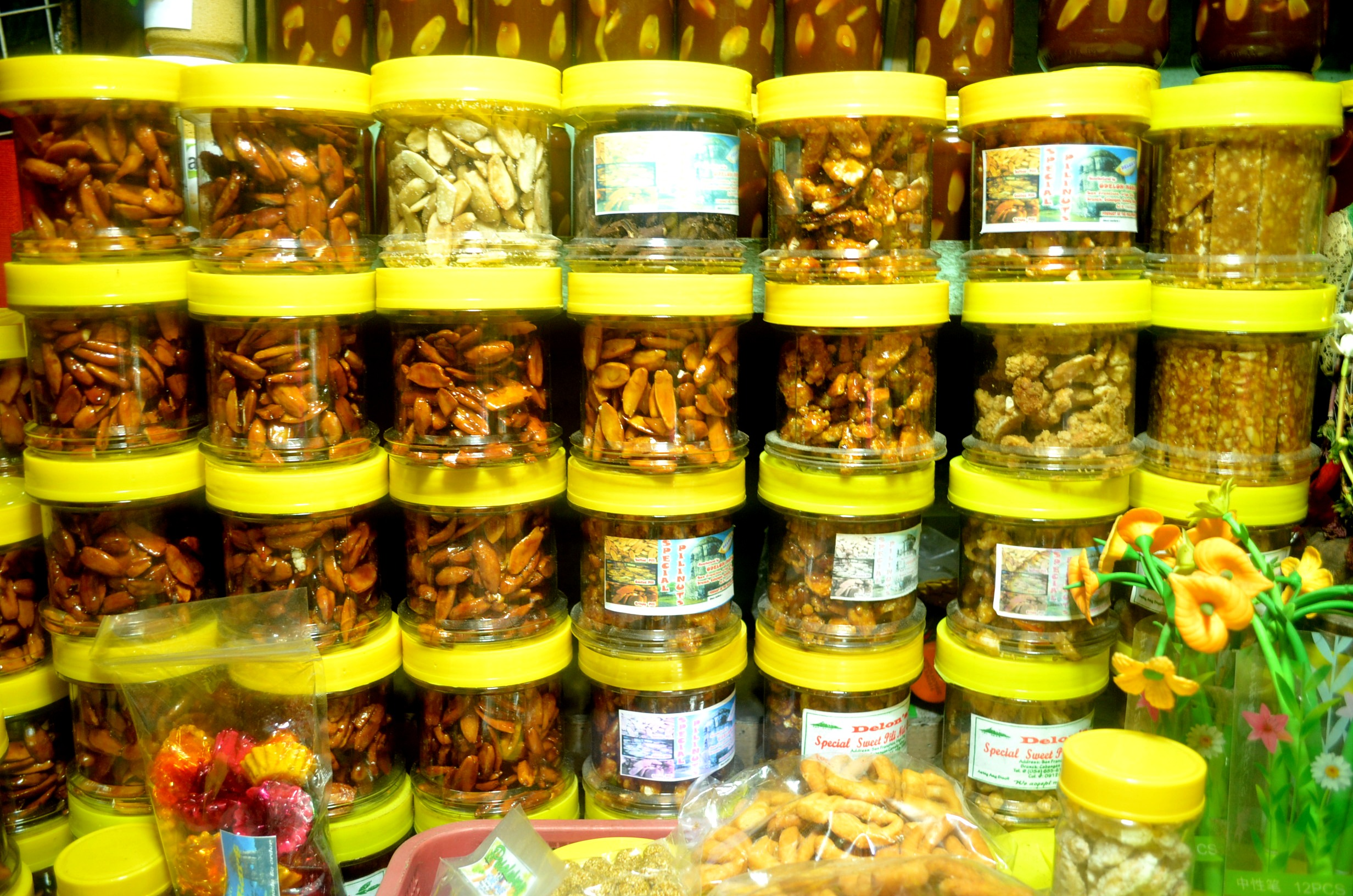
Pili nut products at a pasalubong center in Iriga market

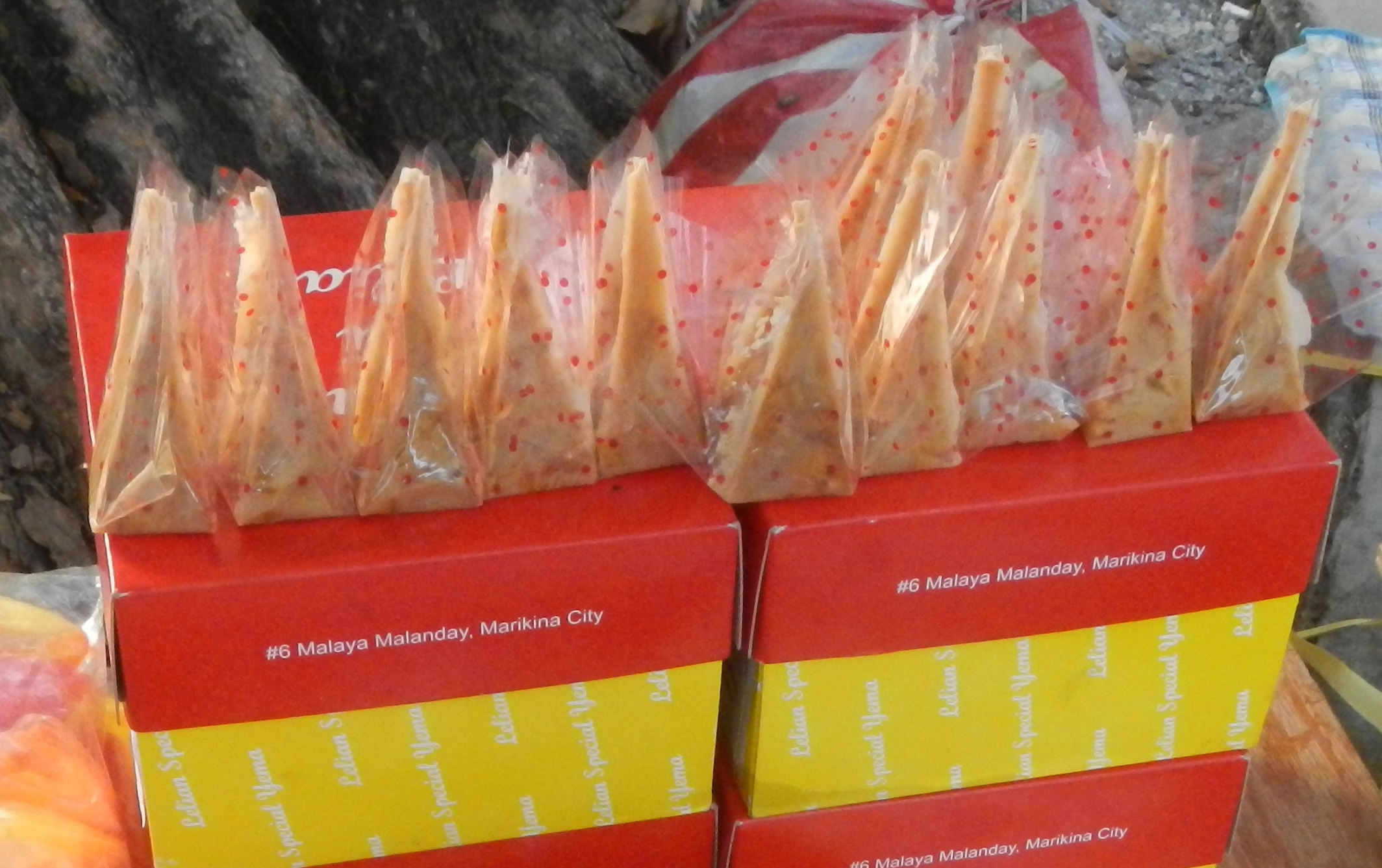
Pyramid-shaped yema candies

Typical pasalubong specialties of different regions in the Philippines include the following:

- Luzon

- Bicol: pili nut
- Central Luzon

- Bulacan: belekoy, biscocho de sebo, kesong puti, inipit, pastillas , chicharong baboy
- Pampanga: turrones de casúy, tibok-tibok, moche, duman

- Cordillera Administrative Region: strawberry, Sagada coffee, Benguet coffee, Lengua de Gato
- Ilocos: Pasuquin biscocho, empanada
- Southern Tagalog Mainland: biscocho de Manila, puto bumbong

- Batangas: Barako coffee
- Cavite: quesillo, Barako coffee
- Laguna: buko pie, kesong puti, uraro, espasol, puto Biñan
- Quezon: yema cake, leche puto, budin, uraro, kiping, lambanog
- Manila: hopiang ube

- Marinduque: uraro

- Palawan: danggit lamayo, cashew
- Visayas: binangkal, ampaw

- Central Visayas: caycay

- Bohol: kalamay,
- Cebu: otap, ngohiong, queseo, rosquillos, masi, masareal

- Eastern Visayas: binagol, moron, salukara

- Leyte: roscas

- Western Visayas: piaya, napoleones, pinasugbo, lumpiang ubod, barquillos, biscocho principe, kinihad, biscocho de caña, ugoy-ugoy, baye baye

- Guimaras: carabao mango

- Mindanao: binangkal

- Bangsamoro: kumukunsi, Sulu coffee, jaa, dodol, panyalam, palapa
- Camiguin: pastel de Camiguin, lanzones
- Caraga: sayongsong
- Northern Mindanao: binaki
- Davao: durian
- Zamboanga: lokot-lokot

== In other cultures ==
Similar concepts exist in other culture. In Japan Meibutsu refers to regional specialties and omiyage to souvenirs. In Kuwait, a gift brought by travellers is called a صوغة ṣōḡa, itself taken from Persian سوغات sowğāt which refers to the same concept.
