= Ohaldre =

Puff pastries

- Alternative names: hojaldre
- Type: Pastry
- Place of origin: Philippines
- Region or state: Visayas

Ohaldres (from Spanish hojaldres) are Filipino puff pastries originating from the Visayas Islands. They are very similar to utap, and are sometimes considered a type of utap, but they have a denser texture and are sliced thicker. They are usually baked as tight spirals or double whorls and are around 1 to 3 in (2.5 to 7.6 cm) in diameter.

== See also ==
- Apas (biscuit)
- Palmier
