= Biscocho =

Twice-baked bread in the Philippines

Biskotso
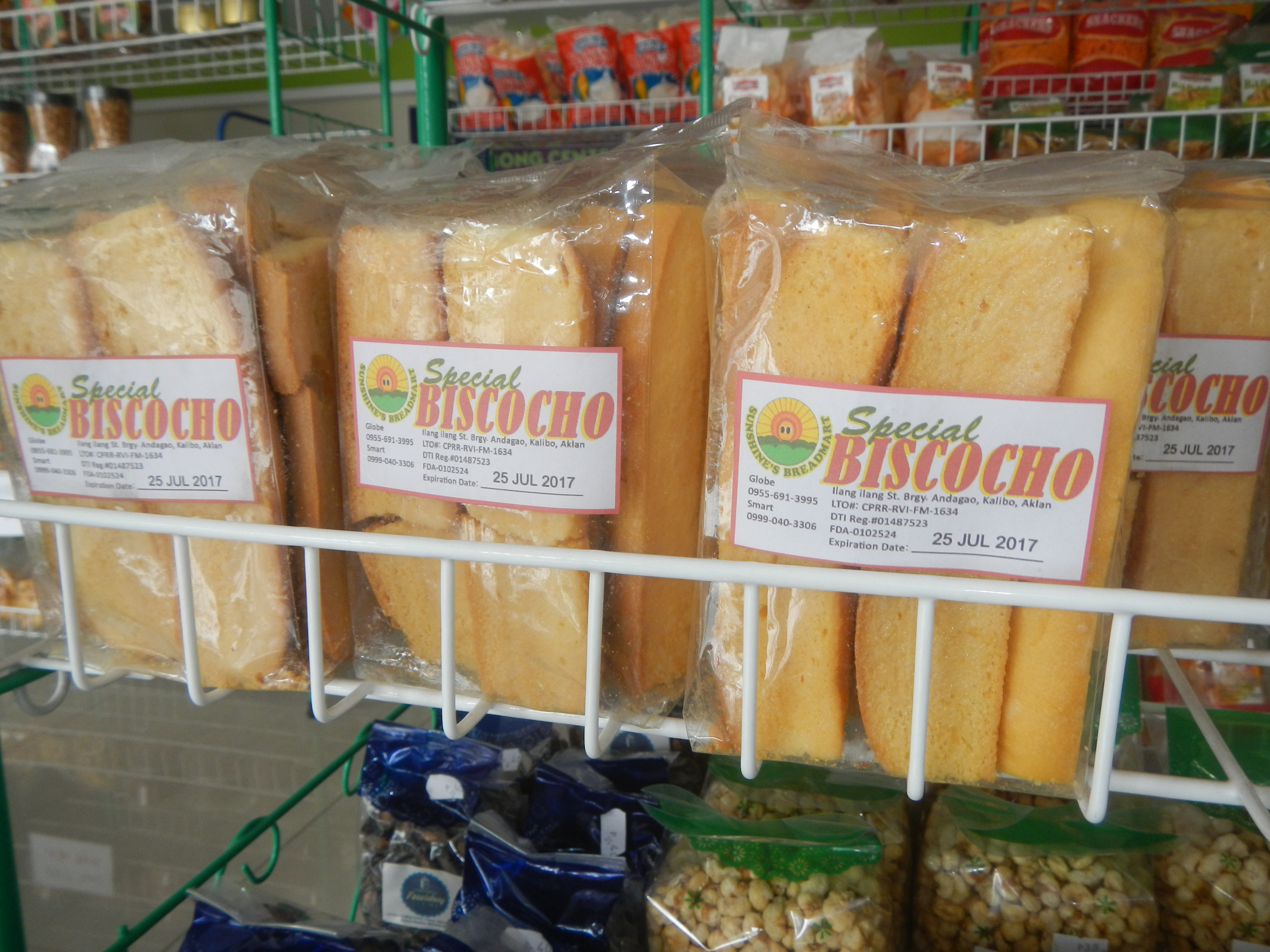
- Biscocho de caña
- Alternative names: Biskoto, Biscocho duro, Machacao, Matsakaw
- Type: Bread
- Place of origin: Philippines

Biscocho, also spelled biskotso (from Spanish: bizcocho), refers to various types of Filipino twice-baked breads, usually coated with butter and sugar, or garlic in some cases. Biscocho is most strongly associated with the versions from the province of Iloilo, although it actually exists nationwide in various forms. It is also known as biscocho duro, machacao, or matsakaw. It is also historically known as pan de caña (literally "[sugar]cane bread").

== History ==
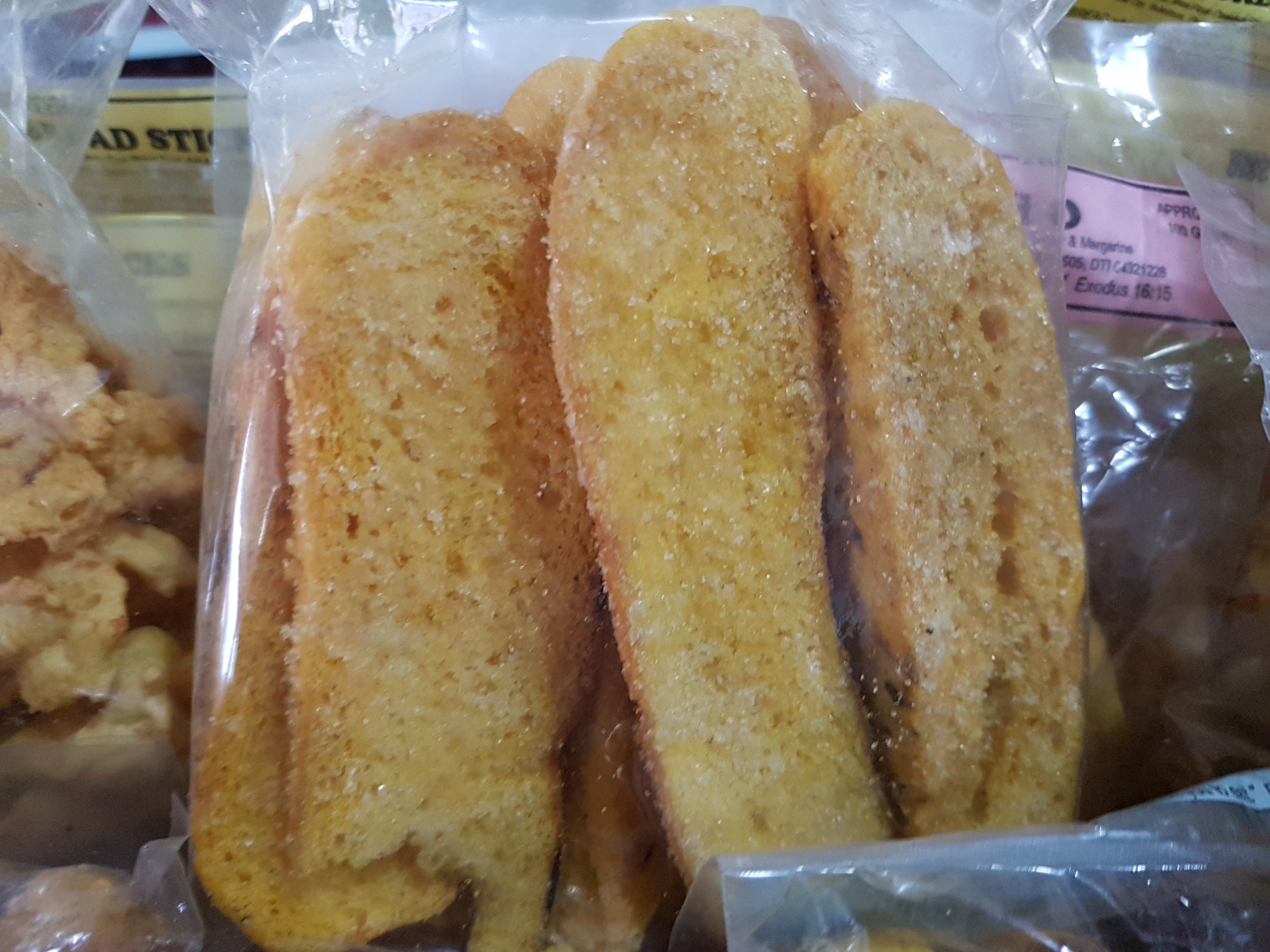
Biscocho principe

The term biscocho is derived from Spanish bizcocho. However, they are not the same pastries. The original Spanish bizcocho refers to a type of sponge cake known as broas in the Philippines. The crunchy twice-baked and sugar-coated Philippine biscocho (more properly biscocho duro), does not exist in Spanish cuisine. There are multiple claims of people who "invented" the biscocho in the Philippines, usually varying depending on the region.

== Variants ==
There are several types of biscochos from various parts of the Philippines. All of them are usually referred to as "biscocho" colloquially, which can be confusing. A common characteristic of biscocho is that they are typically stale bread that are baked a second time. They include:

=== Biscocho de caña ===
Biscocho de caña is the most well-known variant of biscocho. It is a specialty of the Western Visayas islands, particularly the province of Iloilo. They are pieces of stale bread with a small amount of sugar (and no butter) that is then baked to achieve a crunchy texture. The breads used can range from flat sliced breads to sliced pieces of pan de monja (monay).

=== Biscocho de Manila ===
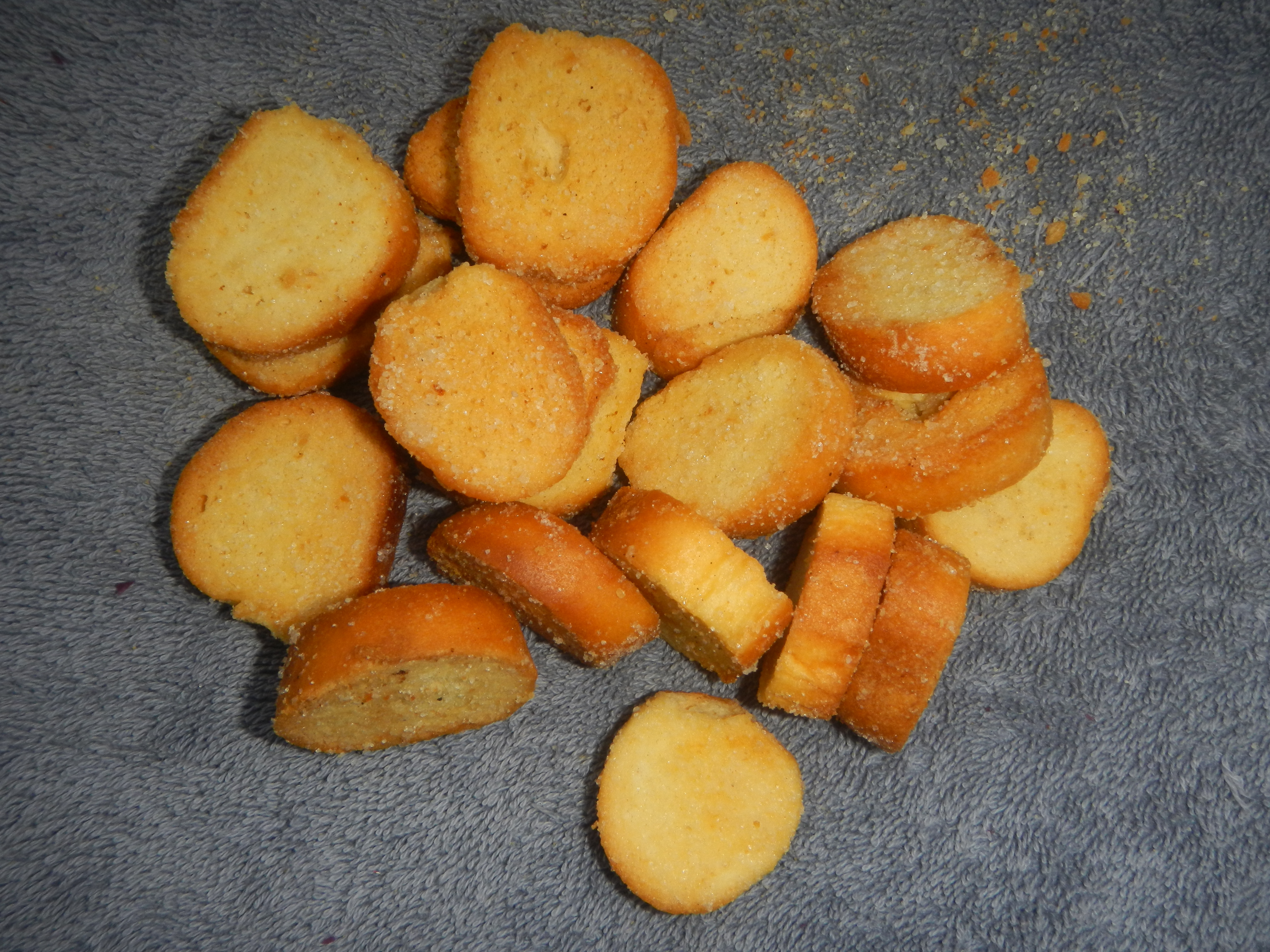
Biscocho de Manila

Biscocho de Manila originates from Manila. It is characteristically small and round and dusted with white sugar.

=== Biscocho de rosca ===
Biscocho de rosca, more commonly known as rosca, is technically a cookie, and not a type of biscocho. It is from the towns of Barugo and Carigara of the island of Leyte. It is made with lard, anise, flour, sugar, butter, and eggs.

=== Biscocho de sebo ===
Biscocho de sebo, also known as corbata de sebo, is a bow tie-shaped biscocho from Malolos, Bulacan. It is characteristically made with lard and thus has an oily texture. It is only minimally sweetened.

=== Biscocho principe ===
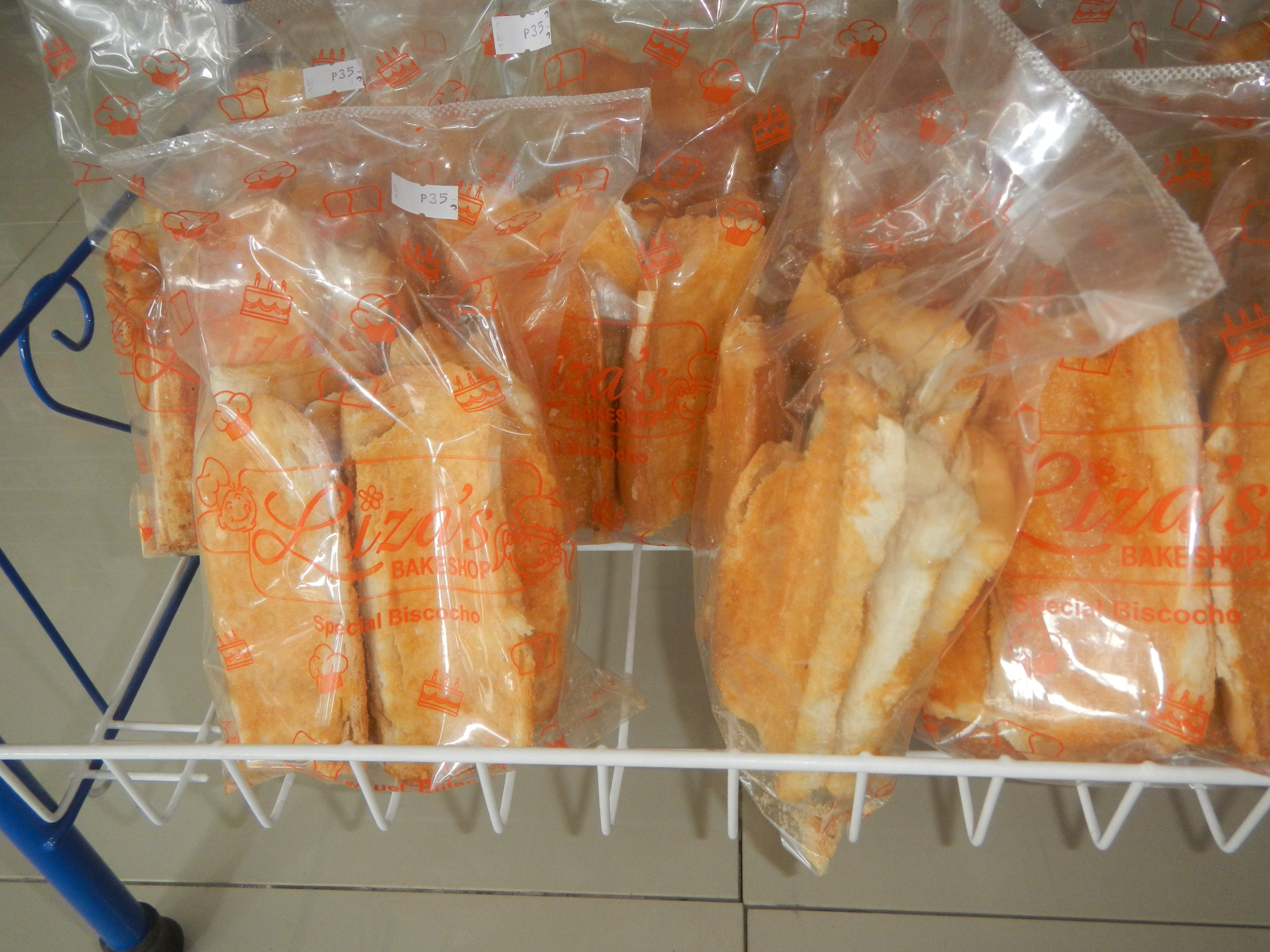
Biscocho principe

Biscocho principe, also spelled biscocho prinsipe, is another type of biscocho from Iloilo. It is similar to biscocho de caña but uses butter and more sugar. It can use any type of bread, but usually uses slices of stale ensaymada, as it is already slathered in butter.

=== Garlic biscocho ===
Garlic biscocho is a variant of biscocho principe that is topped with butter and garlic (instead of sugar).

=== Kinihad ===
Kinihad literally means "sliced", from Hiligaynon kihad ("to slice"). It refers to plain thinly sliced bread (without butter or sugar) that is baked to a crunchy texture. It originates from the Ilonggo regions of the Western Visayas.

=== Pasuquin biscocho ===
Pasuiquin biscocho is named after the town of Pasuquin in Ilocos Norte from where it originates. Pasuiquin biscocho is shaped like small rolls. It comes in soft and crunchy versions. It does not use butter or sugar, instead it is flavored with anise or anise liqueur, giving it a tangy and slightly salty taste.

== See also ==
- Pan de regla
- Mamon tostado
- Otap
- Garlic bread
- List of bread dishes
