= Coconut toffee =

Filipino candy made from coconut milk and sugar

- Alternative names: Balikutsa, Ginaok
- Type: Sweets
- Place of origin: Philippines
- Main ingredients: Sugar, coconut milk

Coconut toffee is a traditional chewy candy from the Philippines made with muscovado sugar and coconut milk boiled until thick and then allowed to cool and harden. It is also locally known as balikutsa in the Visayas and Mindanao, and gináok in the Tagalog regions.

It is similar to the pulot of the Western Visayas except that pulot is made with palm sugar.

== See also ==
- Kalamay
- Belekoy
- Coconut jam
- Dodol
- Toffee
- Panocha
- Taffy (candy)
- Yema
- List of candies
