= Roscas (Filipino cuisine) =

Type of pastry

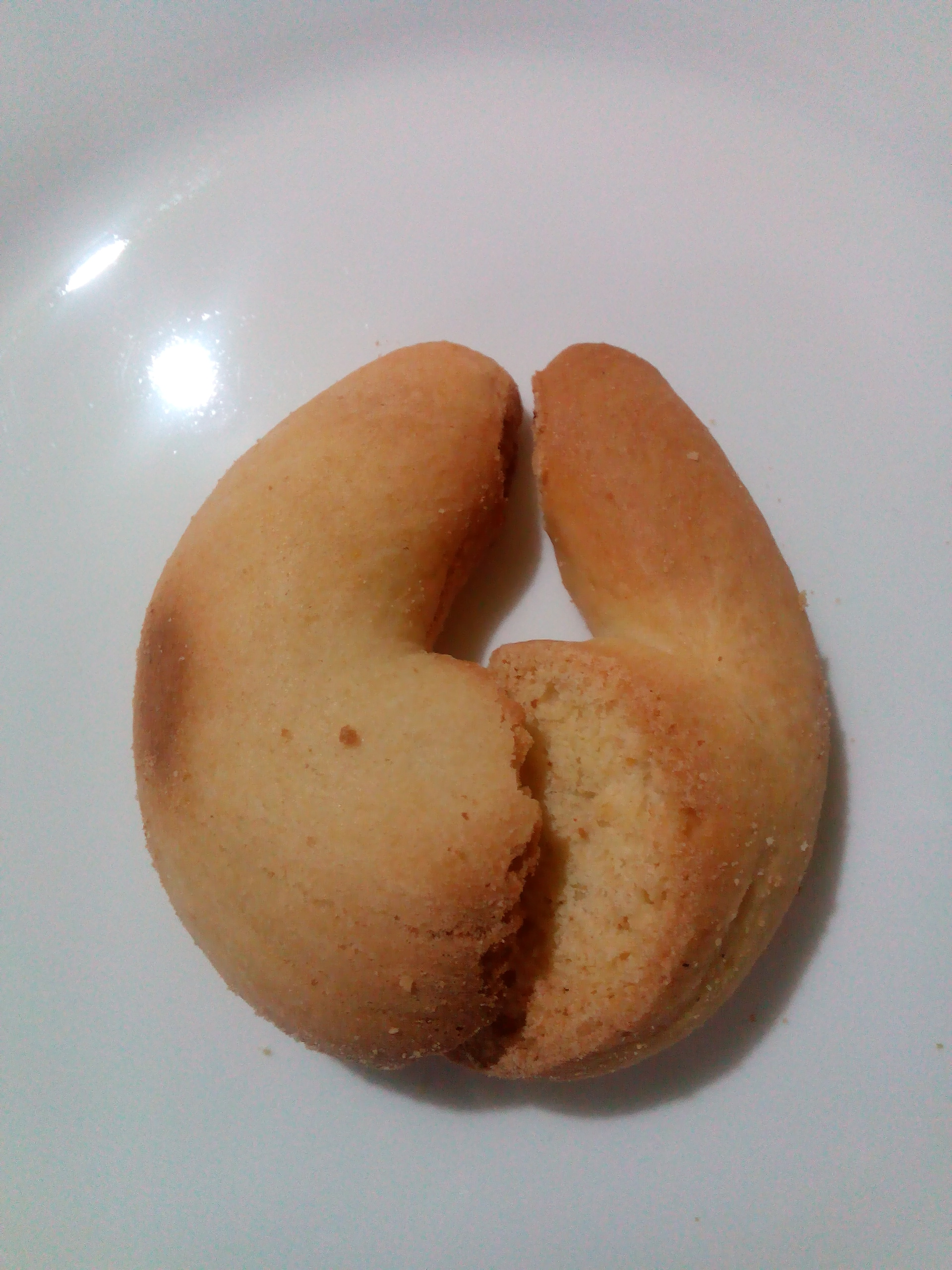
- Two pieces of the Leyte "roscas" joined together for presentation.
- Alternative names: Rosca de biscocho
- Type: Cookie, pastry, biscuit
- Course: snack, dessert
- Place of origin: Philippines
- Region or state: Leyte and Samar
- Main ingredients: lard, anise, flour, sugar, butter, and egg yolks
- Variations: with tuba palm wine as liqueur ingredient

In Philippine cuisine, roscas or biscochos de roscas refer to a type of pastry cookies from the province of Leyte, mainly from the towns of Barugo and Carigara, made from lard, anise, flour, sugar, butter and eggs. These roscas are initially shaped as crescents or penannular rings (hence the name—roscas is Spanish for "rings"). Each of the roscas is then cut in half before baking, resulting in two separate elbow-shaped cookies.

While some claim that these pasalubong pastry cookies trace their history to the Spanish era, others have indicated that roscas-making in Leyte was started in the town of Barugo by a returning migrant only in the late 1960s; the migrant's success was purportedly replicated in the nearby town of Carigara and the far town of Calbayog in Samar province. What original recipe the roscas derive from remains unspecified in that account, however.

== See also ==
- Half-moon cookie
- Biscocho
- Rosquillo
- List of Philippine desserts
