= Belekoy =

Filipino delicacy

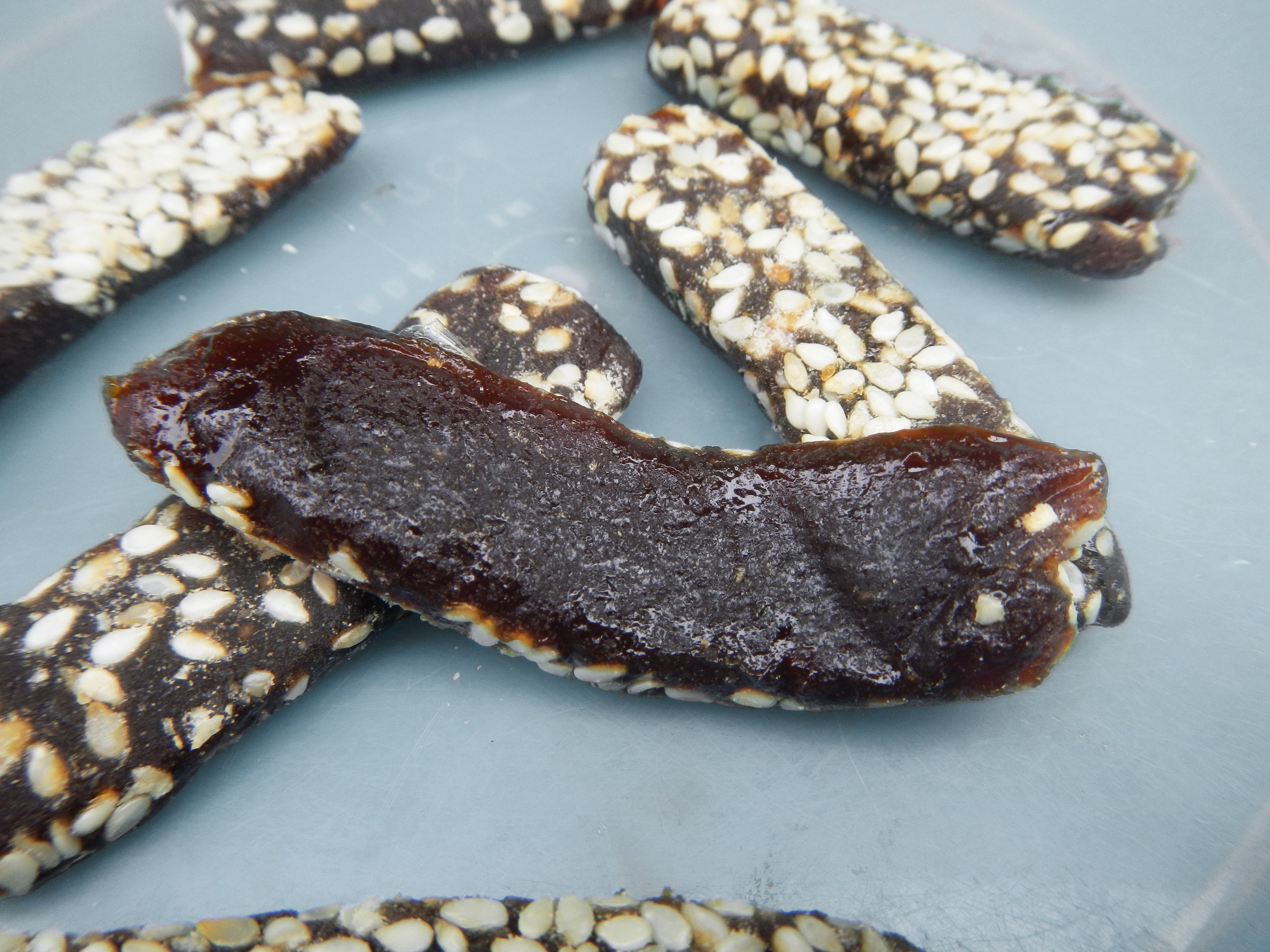
- Type: Pastry
- Place of origin: Philippines
- Region or state: Bulacan
- Main ingredients: Flour, sugar, sesame seeds, vanilla

Belekoy is a Filipino delicacy that originated from Bulacan, Philippines. This sweet confection is prepared with flour, sugar, sesame seeds and vanilla. It is baked in a pan where it is then cut into rectangular or square shapes. Variations of this dessert mix in candies and nuts such as caramel, chocolate, and walnuts.

== See also ==
- Coconut toffee
- Pastillas
- Balikucha
