= Barugo =

Municipality in Leyte, Philippines

- Municipality
- Municipality of Barugo
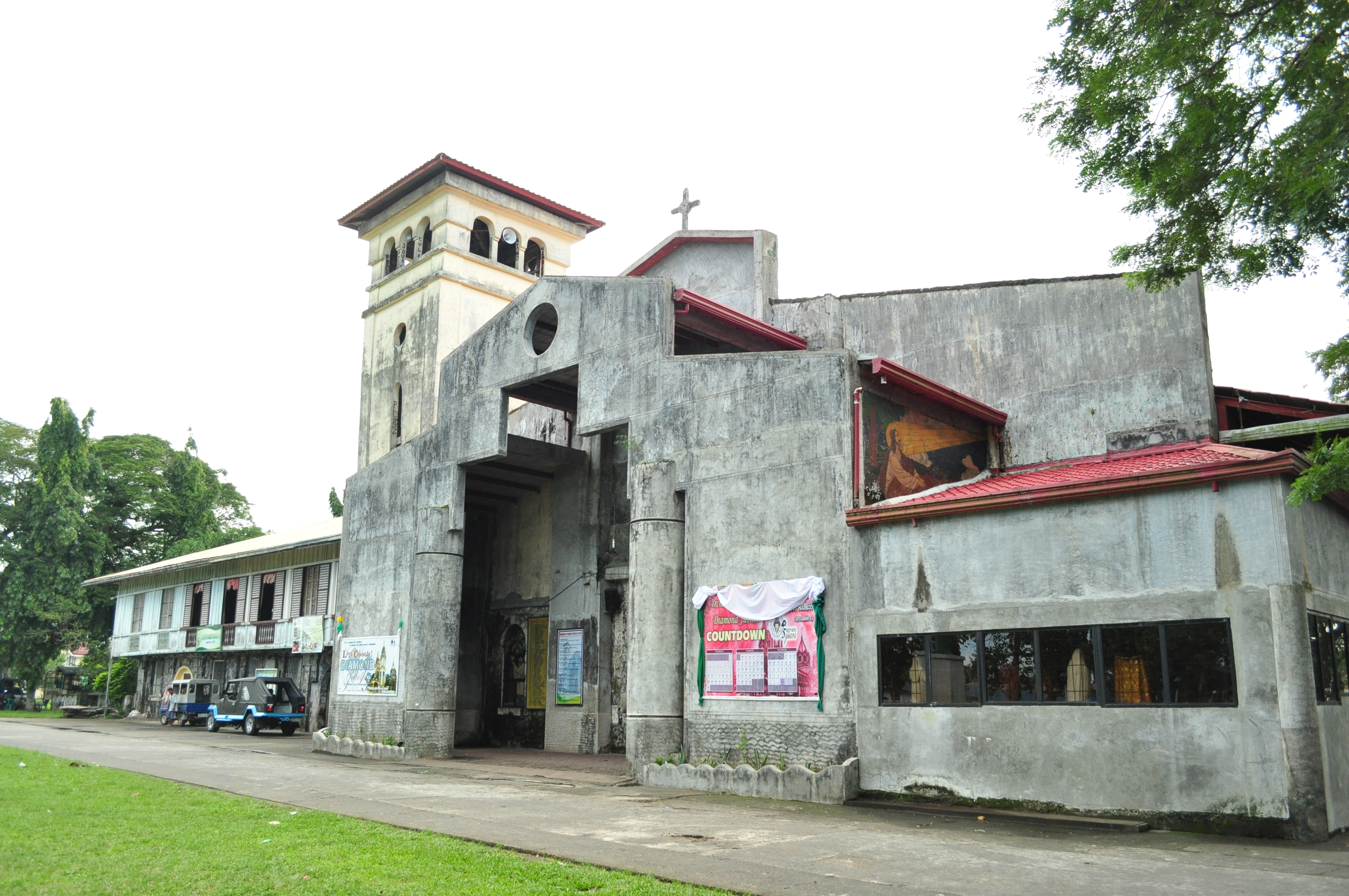
- Church of Barugo

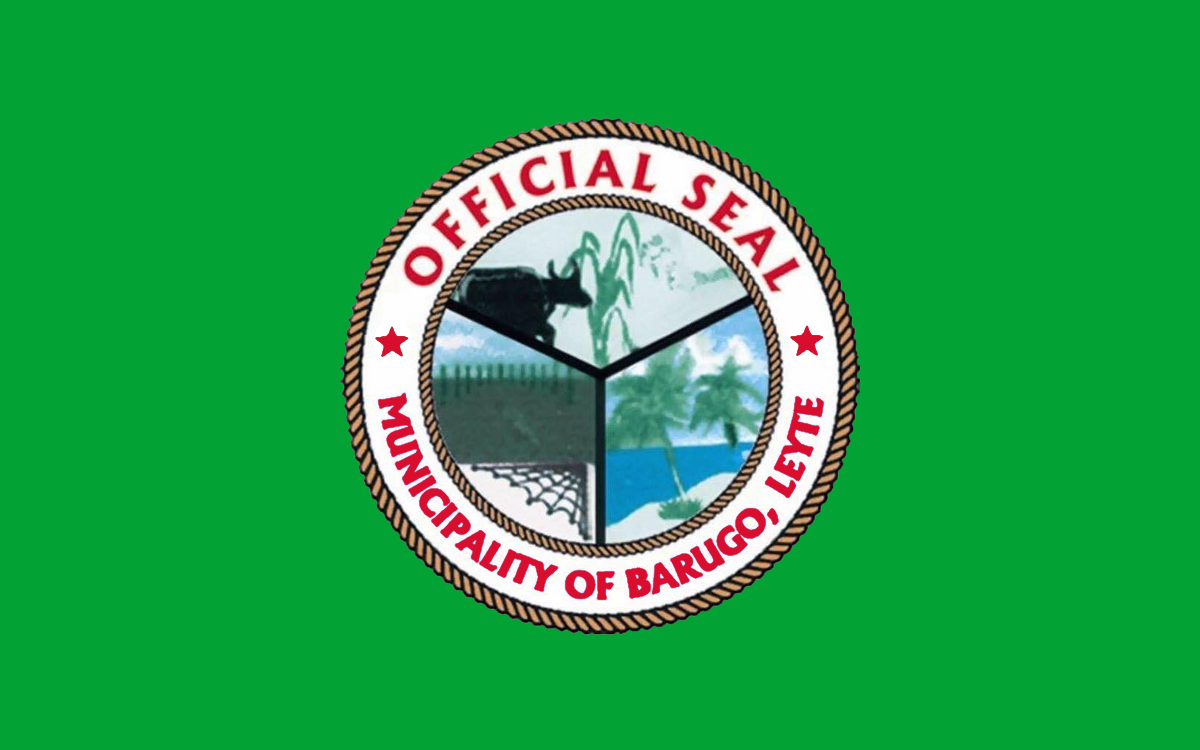
- Flag

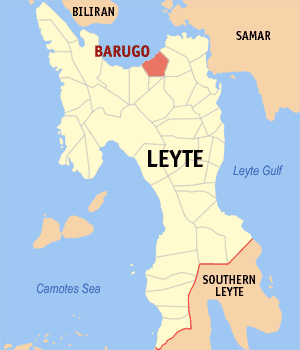
- Map of Leyte with Barugo highlighted
- Interactive map of Barugo
- Location within the Philippines
- Coordinates: 11°19′N 124°44′E
- Country: Philippines
- Region: Eastern Visayas
- Province: Leyte
- District: 2nd district
- Barangays: 37 (see Barangays)

Government
  - Type: Sangguniang Bayan
  - Mayor: Dr. Aron C. Balais
  - Vice Mayor: Atty. Jesus B. Cabanacan
  - Representative: Lolita T. Javier
  - Councilors: List: • Felix A. Diloy; • Josephine C. Tiu; • Roselyn L. Baltar; • Nikkos Rhet V. Astorga; • Sonia A. Cañeda; • Charee Mae M. Avila; • Eduardo C. Calzita; • Harold Edgar C. Apostol; DILG Masterlist of Officials
  - Electorate: 25,771 voters (2025)

Area
  - Total: 84.62 km^{2} (32.67 sq mi)
- Elevation: 80 m (260 ft)
- Highest elevation: 1,290 m (4,230 ft)
- Lowest elevation: 0 m (0 ft)

Population (2024 census)
  - Total: 35,402
  - Density: 418.4/km^{2} (1,084/sq mi)
  - Households: 7,957

Economy
  - Income class: 3rd municipal income class
  - Poverty incidence: 33.88% (2023)
  - Revenue: ₱ 166.7 million (2024)
  - Assets: ₱ 350.3 million (2024)
  - Expenditure: ₱ 211.7 million (2024)
  - Liabilities: ₱ 60.01 million (2024)

Service provider
  - Electricity: Leyte 3 Electric Cooperative (LEYECO 3)
- Time zone: UTC+8 (PST)
- ZIP code: 6519
- PSGC: 0803706000
- IDD : area code: +63 (0)53
- Native languages: Waray; Tagalog
- Website: www.barugo-leyte.gov.ph

Barugo (IPA: [bɐˈɾugo]), officially the Municipality of Barugo (Waray: Bungto han Barugo; Tagalog: Bayan ng Barugo), is a municipality in the province of Leyte, Philippines. According to the 2024 census, it has a population of 35,402 people.

Residents of the town of Barugo are traditionally referred to as Barugonon but often incorrectly referred to as Barugueños.

Barugo is a town in the northern coastal part of Leyte province facing Carigara Bay, 50 kilometres (31 mi) north-west of Tacloban City, whose history dates back to the early days of Spanish colonization.

== Etymology ==
In Barugo there is a legend which was being taught to elementary pupils during the 1950s and 1960s regarding how the town got its name. The legend goes like this: "Once upon a time there was a man named Cassadok. One day while he was resting by the river bank under the shade of a giant tree, a Spaniard came along and asked him the name of the place. Cassadok did not understand Spanish and thinking the Spaniard was asking the name of the big shady tree, answered "Balugo." From that time on, the place came to be known as "Balugo." When the Americans came, they changed the letter "L" to "R" and thus to this day the town is called Barugo." This story has no basis in fact and is simply a legend. For the early Spanish historians and chroniclers have always referred to the town by the name it carries today, Barugo.

== History ==
Early during the Spanish rule, the area was given the status of a pueblo (town) when it was established as an "encomienda." An encomienda was a land estate awarded to deserving Spaniards for services rendered to the Spanish Crown. The grantee of an encomienda, known as encomiendero, was given the right to rule the encomienda in accordance with the Spanish laws and to extract tributes from the natives, part of which went to the Spanish Crown.

Miguel Lopez de Legaspi, the first governor of Las Islas Filipinas, started the practice of designating large landed estates as encomiendas. Only ten months after Cebu and Manila became encomiendas, Barugo was also designated as one on November 3, 1571. Rodrigo de Vargas was the first encomiendero for Barugo.

The education of the natives in Leyte started with the arrival of the Jesuits on July 16, 1595. The mission schools in the beginning concentrated on the basics of Christianity. Barugo initially was only a "visita" of Carigara, meaning that it was under the administrative and spiritual supervision of the curate of Carigara, and was under the care of Fr. Mateo Sanchez, who eventually became its first parish priest after Barugo was declared as an independent parish. It was Fr. Sanchez who established the first church in Barugo.

The Jesuits stayed in Leyte from 1595 to 1767. During that time they expanded their influence starting from Carigara and Barugo, in the hinterlands of Ogmuc (Ormoc), Dulac (Dulag), Palo, Alangalang, Malibago (?) and the entire island of Cibabaw (Samar). When Charles III of Spain ordered the expulsion of the Jesuits from all Spanish dominions in 1767, the Jesuit mission on Leyte was handed over to the Augustinians. And later in 1843, the same missions were taken over by the Franciscan Friars. Fray Timoteo Calderon was the first Franciscan curate assigned to Barugo. At that time in 1843, Barugo already had 1,744 taxpayers and 8,381 residents. The towns of Alangalang, Jaro, Babatngon, Malibago (?) and San Miguel were once only "visitas" of Barugo.

Today Barugo nestles along the coast of Carigara Bay. But the original settlement of Barugo was way upstream by the banks of the Himanglos River, which during the time of the conquistadores was called Barugo River.

It is highly probable that the first Barugo settlement was in the place which is now known as Nasunogan, meaning a place burned down. This assumption is born by the fact that the old Spanish road leading to the towns of Tunga and Jaro starts at this place and the ruins of an old Spanish stone church is found there. This assumption is also corroborated, firstly, by the writings of Fr. Chirino wherein he described their travels by foot to Barugo and of a settlement by "la orilla," meaning by the bank of a river and by the mouth of the river. Secondly, the story of Fr. Mateo Sanchez, regarding their attempt to reach a seriously sick man, tells of their travel from the town of Barugo by "a small boat in which we sailed to seek our sick man, who was living in horon, far from the town and near the coast."

From Nasunogan, after the old settlement was burned, the people moved to another place which is now called Binongto-an, meaning a place abandoned as a town, now a sitio of Barangay Pikas. The settlers did not stay there long and moved eventually to the present site of the town. This conclusion stems from the fact that lasting structures can be found in Binongto-an.

(Excerpts from the research, Barugo - Its Fabled History, by a prominent Barugon-on, the late Joel Villasin Aruta; excerpts edited by JC Himanglos.)

== Geography ==
=== Barangays ===
Barugo is politically subdivided into 37 barangays. Each barangay consists of puroks and some have sitios.

- Abango
- Amahit
- Balire
- Balud
- Bukid
- Bulod
- Busay
- Cabarasan (Daliran)
- Cabolo-an
- Calingcaguing
- Can-isak
- Canomantag
- Cuta
- Domogdog
- Duka
- Guindaohan
- Hiagsam
- Hilaba
- Hinugayan
- Ibag
- Minuhang
- Minuswang
- Pikas
- Pitogo
- Poblacion Dist. I
- Poblacion Dist. II
- Poblacion Dist. III
- Poblacion Dist. IV
- Poblacion Dist. V
- Poblacion Dist. VI (New Road)
- Pongso
- Roosevelt
- San Isidro
- San Roque
- Santa Rosa
- Santarin
- Tutug-an

=== Climate ===
Climate data for Barugo, Leyte
Month	Jan	Feb	Mar	Apr	May	Jun	Jul	Aug	Sep	Oct	Nov	Dec	Year
Mean daily maximum °C (°F)	28 (82)	29 (84)	29 (84)	31 (88)	31 (88)	30 (86)	30 (86)	30 (86)	30 (86)	29 (84)	29 (84)	29 (84)	30 (85)
Mean daily minimum °C (°F)	22 (72)	22 (72)	22 (72)	23 (73)	24 (75)	25 (77)	25 (77)	25 (77)	25 (77)	24 (75)	24 (75)	23 (73)	24 (75)
Average precipitation mm (inches)	73 (2.9)	56 (2.2)	75 (3.0)	71 (2.8)	114 (4.5)	174 (6.9)	172 (6.8)	163 (6.4)	167 (6.6)	161 (6.3)	158 (6.2)	125 (4.9)	1,509 (59.5)
Average rainy days	15.2	12.5	16.2	17.3	23.9	27.3	28.4	26.9	26.9	27.1	23.8	19.3	264.8
Source: Meteoblue

== Demographics ==
Population census of Barugo

Year	Pop.	±% p.a.
1903	12,360	—
1918	16,187	+1.81%
1939	19,564	+0.91%
1948	21,073	+0.83%
1960	20,787	−0.11%
1970	20,654	−0.06%
1975	24,582	+3.55%
1980	22,173	−2.04%

Year	Pop.	±% p.a.
1990	23,817	+0.72%
1995	26,171	+1.78%
2000	26,919	+0.61%
2007	27,569	+0.33%
2010	30,092	+3.24%
2015	32,745	+1.62%
2020	34,497	+1.10%
2024	35,402	+0.62%

Source: Philippine Statistics Authority

In the 2024 census, the population of Barugo was 35,402 people, with a density of 420 inhabitants per square kilometre or 1,100 inhabitants per square mile.

== Economy ==
Poverty incidence of Barugo

Source: Philippine Statistics Authority

Barugo remains an agricultural town producing rice, corn and copra. Residents of a few coastal barangays are engaged in small-scale fishing and aquaculture. Its cottage industries are the manufacture of tuba (coconut palm wine) and roscas (sweet pastries made of flour, sugar, eggs and shortening). Not unlike the rest of the country, its economy is partly driven by dollar remittances from overseas workers.

== Elected Officials ==
2025-2028 Barugo, Leyte Officials
Position	Name	Party
Mayor	Aron C. Balais	PRP
Vice Mayor	Jesus B. Cabanacan	PRP
Councilors	Felix A. Diloy	PRP
Councilors	Josephine C. Tiu	PRP
Councilors	Roselyn L. Baltar	PRP
Councilors	Nikkos Rhet V. Astorga	PRP
Councilors	Sonia A. Cañeda	PRP
Councilors	Charee Mae M. Avila	NPC
Councilors	Eduardo C. Calzita	PRP
Councilors	Harold Edgar C. Apostol	NPC
Ex Officio Municipal Council Members
ABC President	TBD	Nonpartisan
SK Federation President	TBD	Nonpartisan
