= Apas (biscuit) =

Oblong-shaped biscuit from the Philippines

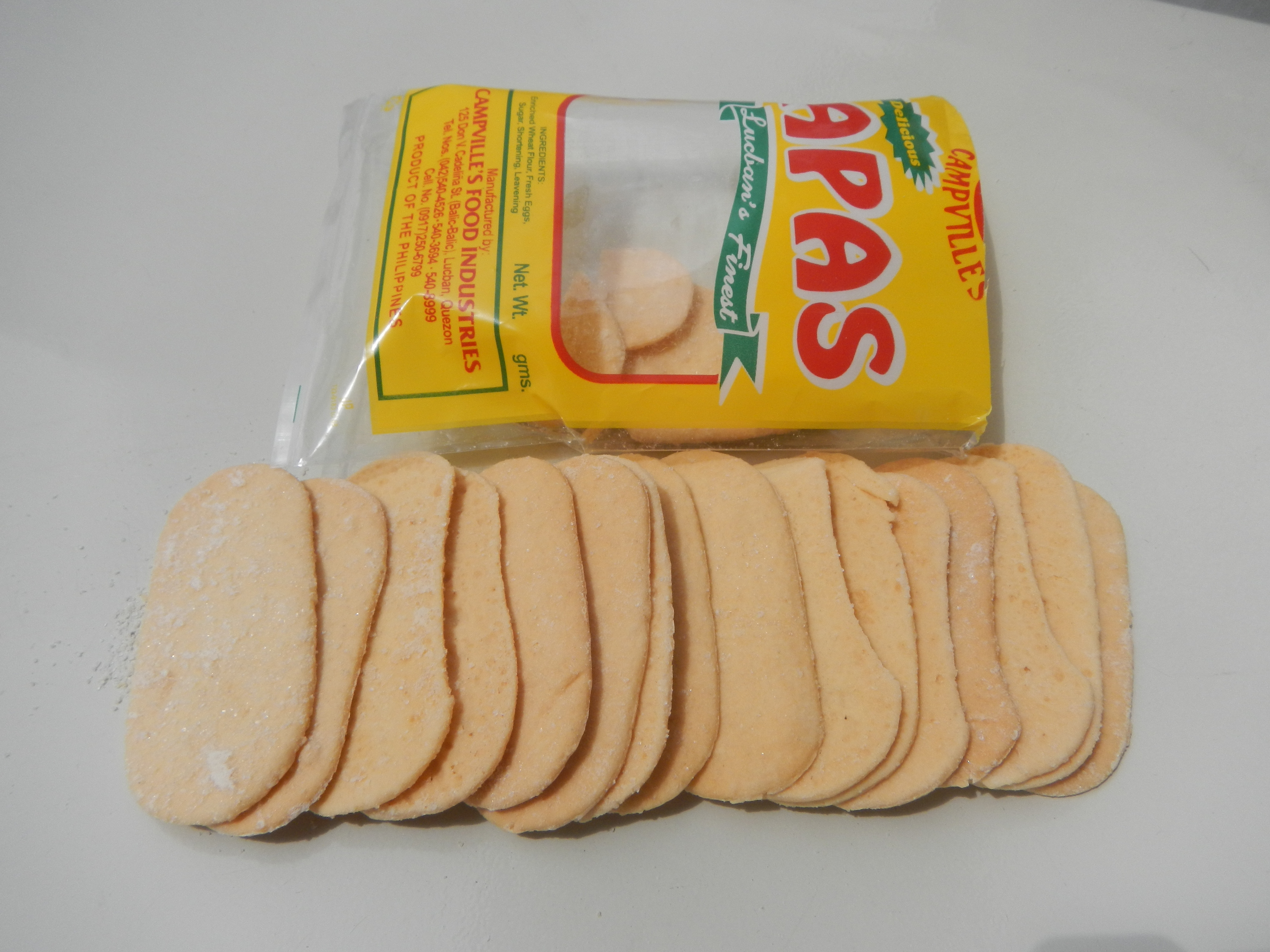
- Alternative names: Binuruhas
- Type: Biscuit
- Place of origin: Philippines
- Region or state: Quezon, Cebu

Apas are very thin oblong-shaped biscuits sprinkled with sugar. They are a specialty of Quezon (particularly Lucena and Lucban) and the wider Southern Tagalog region; but they are also found in Cebu. They are also known as binuruhas in Sariaya (not to be confused with broas). They are made with flour, milk, eggs, sugar, and butter. They are mild-flavored and are typically eaten with hot drinks.

"Apa" is also the Tagalog term for wafer, especially ice cream cones.

== See also ==
- Lengua de gato
- Utap
- Broas
- Ladyfinger (biscuit)
- List of Philippine desserts
