= Piaya (food) =

Negrense flatbread

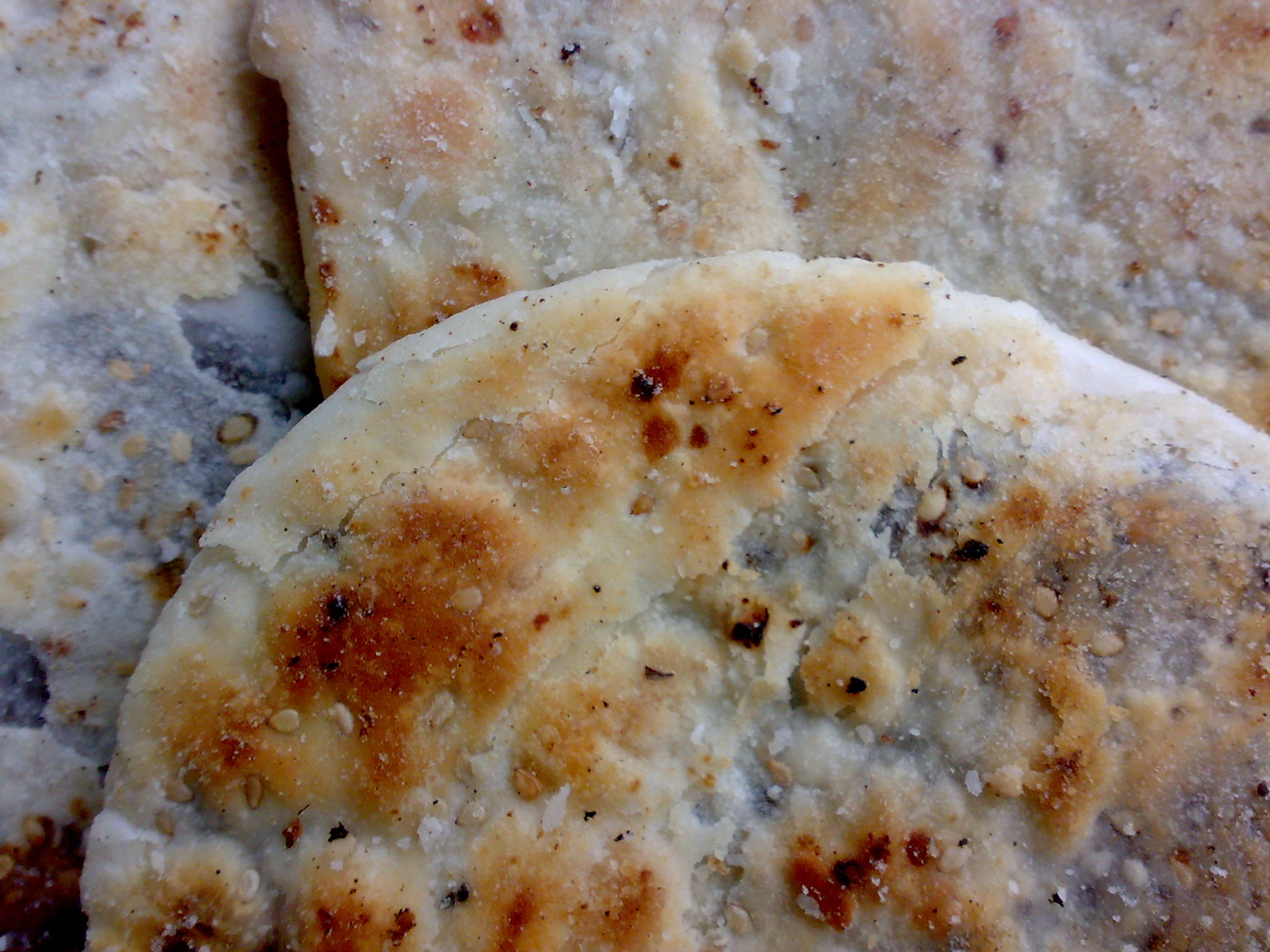
- Muscovado-filled piaya
- Type: Pastry
- Course: Dessert
- Place of origin: Philippines
- Region or state: Negros Occidental
- Associated cuisine: Filipino cuisine
- Serving temperature: Warm or cold
- Main ingredients: Flour and muscovado
- Variations: Piayitos
- Food energy (per serving): 75 kcal (310 kJ)
- Similar dishes: Hopia

A piaya (Hiligaynon: piyaya, pronounced [piˈjaja]; Spanish: piaya, pronounced [ˈpjaʝa]; Hokkien Chinese: 餅仔; Pe̍h-ōe-jī: piáⁿ-iá) is a muscovado-filled unleavened flatbread from the Philippines especially common in Negros Occidental where it is a popular delicacy. It is made by filling dough with a mixture of muscovado and water. The filled dough is then flattened with a rolling pin, sprinkled with sesame seeds and baked on a griddle. Piaya is best eaten warm.

== Variations ==
The traditional sweet filling made of muscovado has other alternatives, including ube and mango. A piayito (Hiligaynon: piyayito) is a tiny version of the piaya and is thin and crispy.

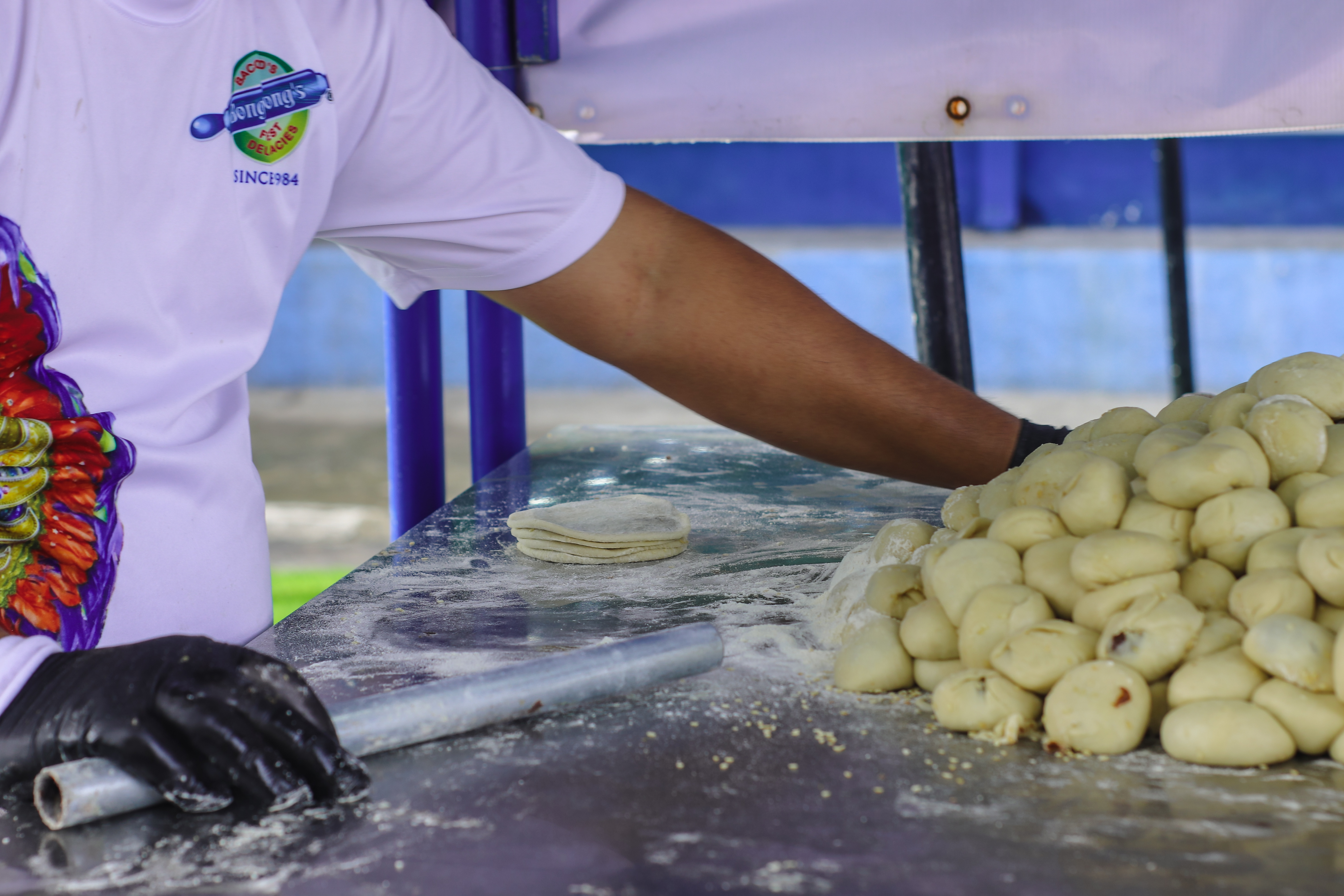
Preparation

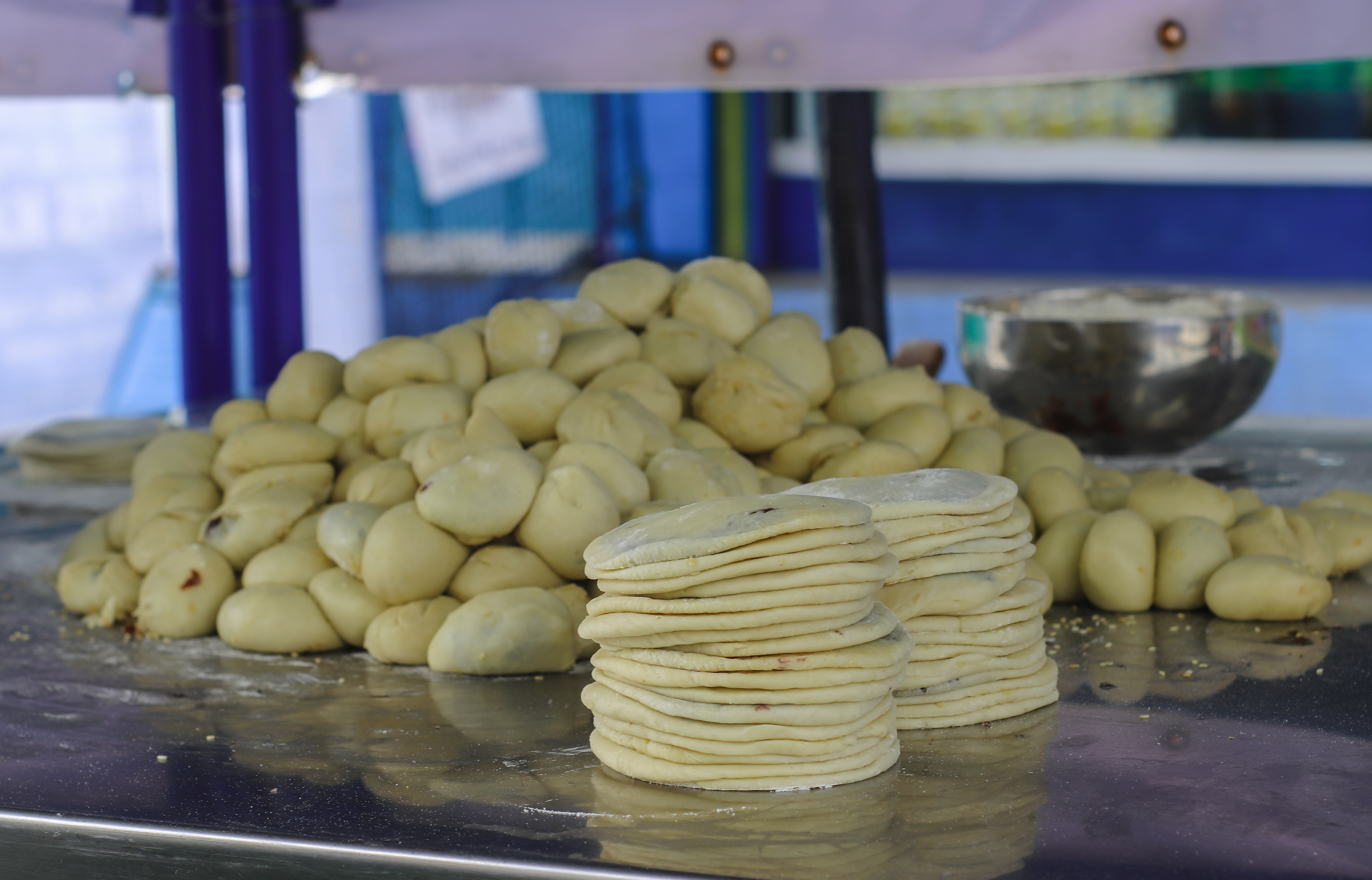
Stacked of uncooked piaya

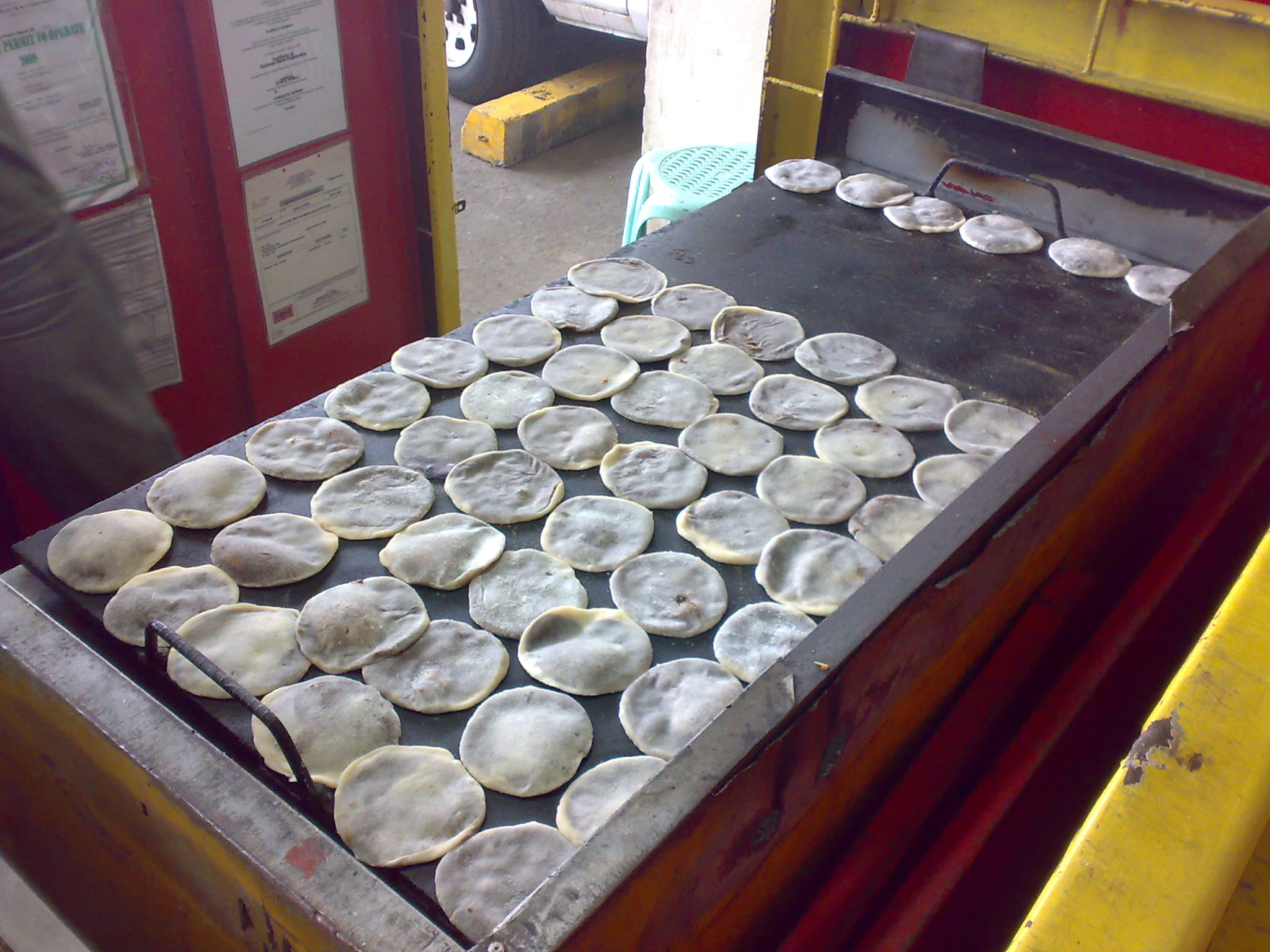
Piaya being baked on a griddle

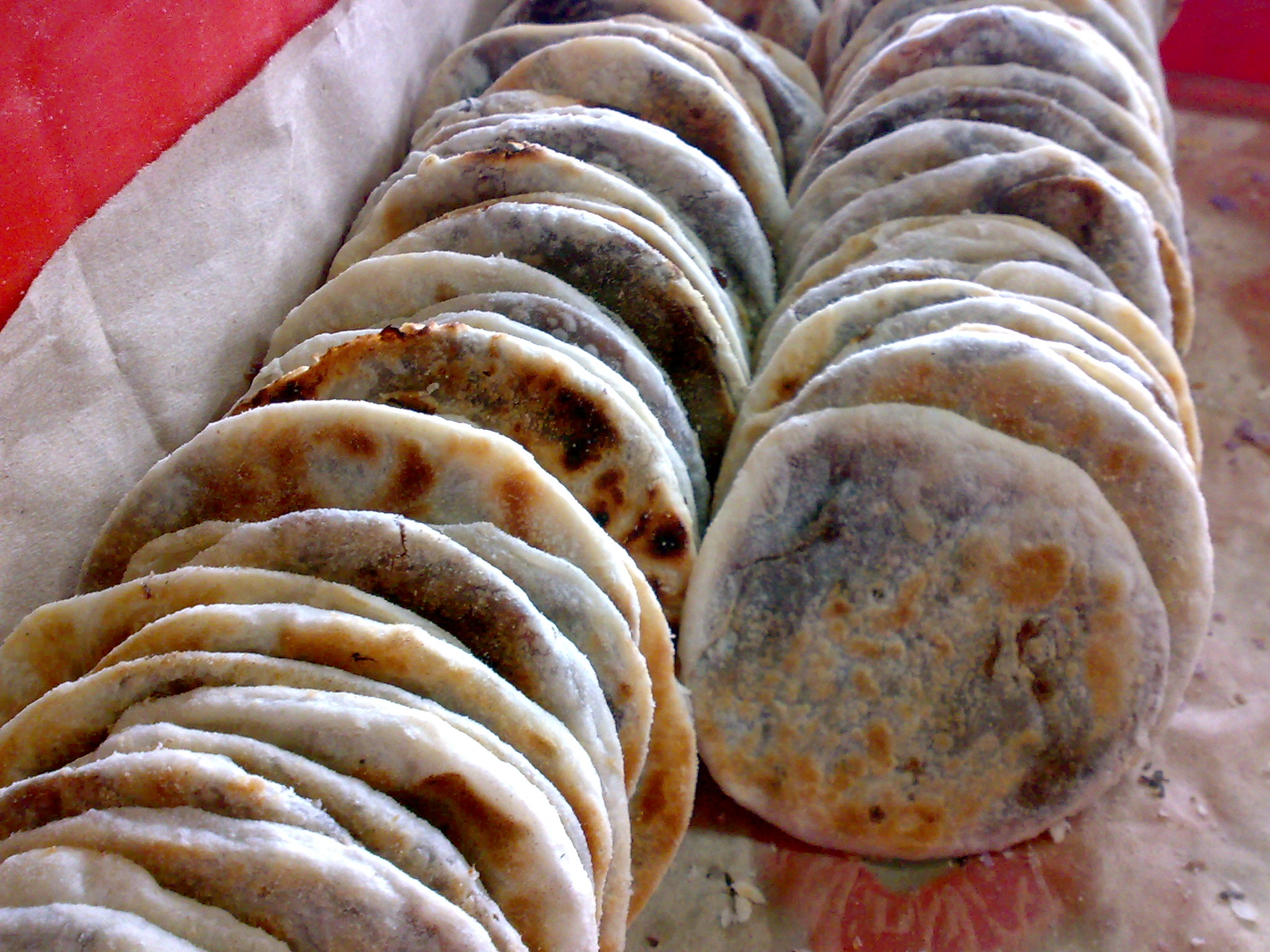
Freshly-baked piaya

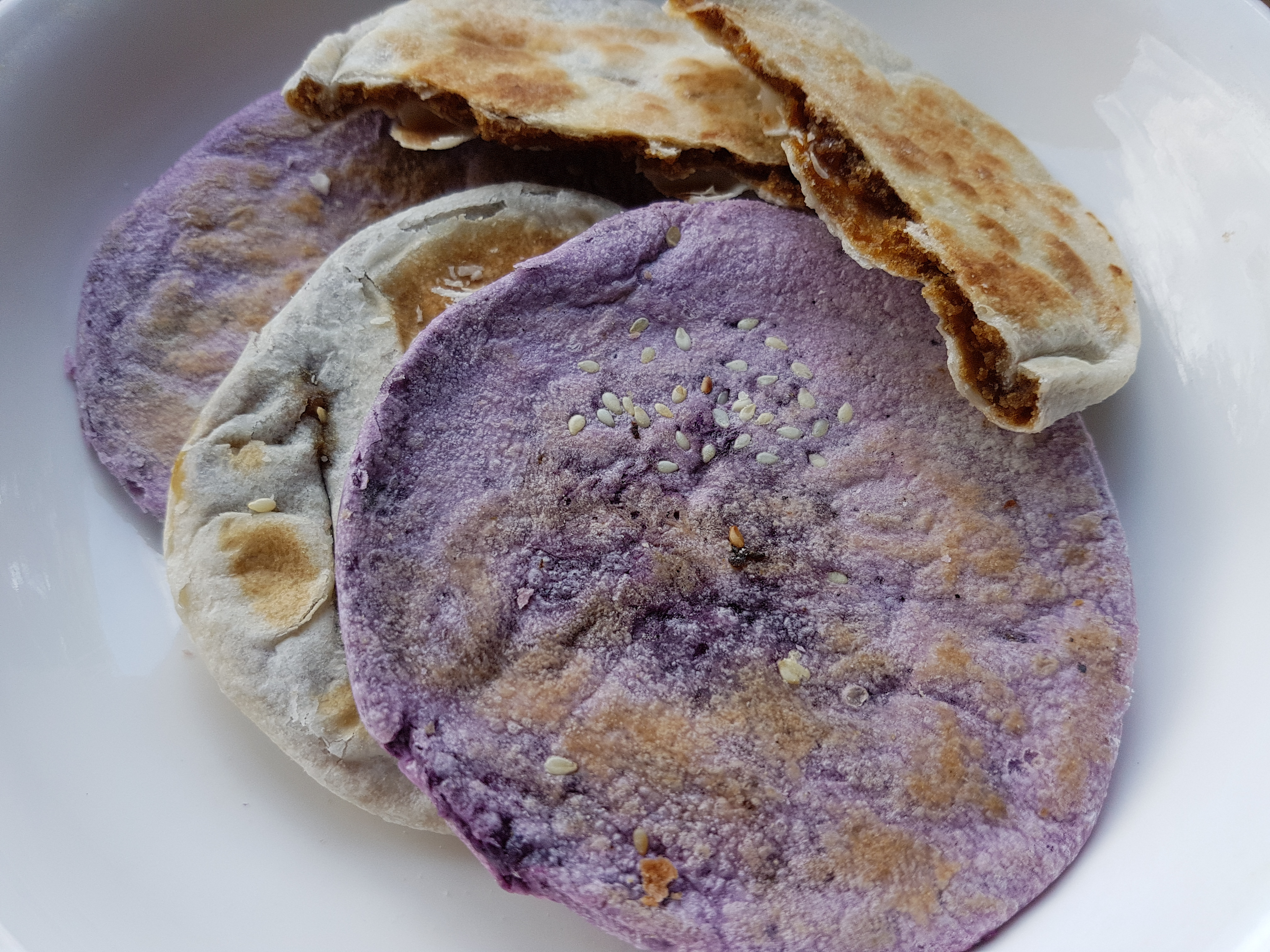
Ube and muscovado piaya

== See also ==
- Bánh pía
- Mooncake
- Bakpia
