= Otap (food) =

Puff pastry cookie

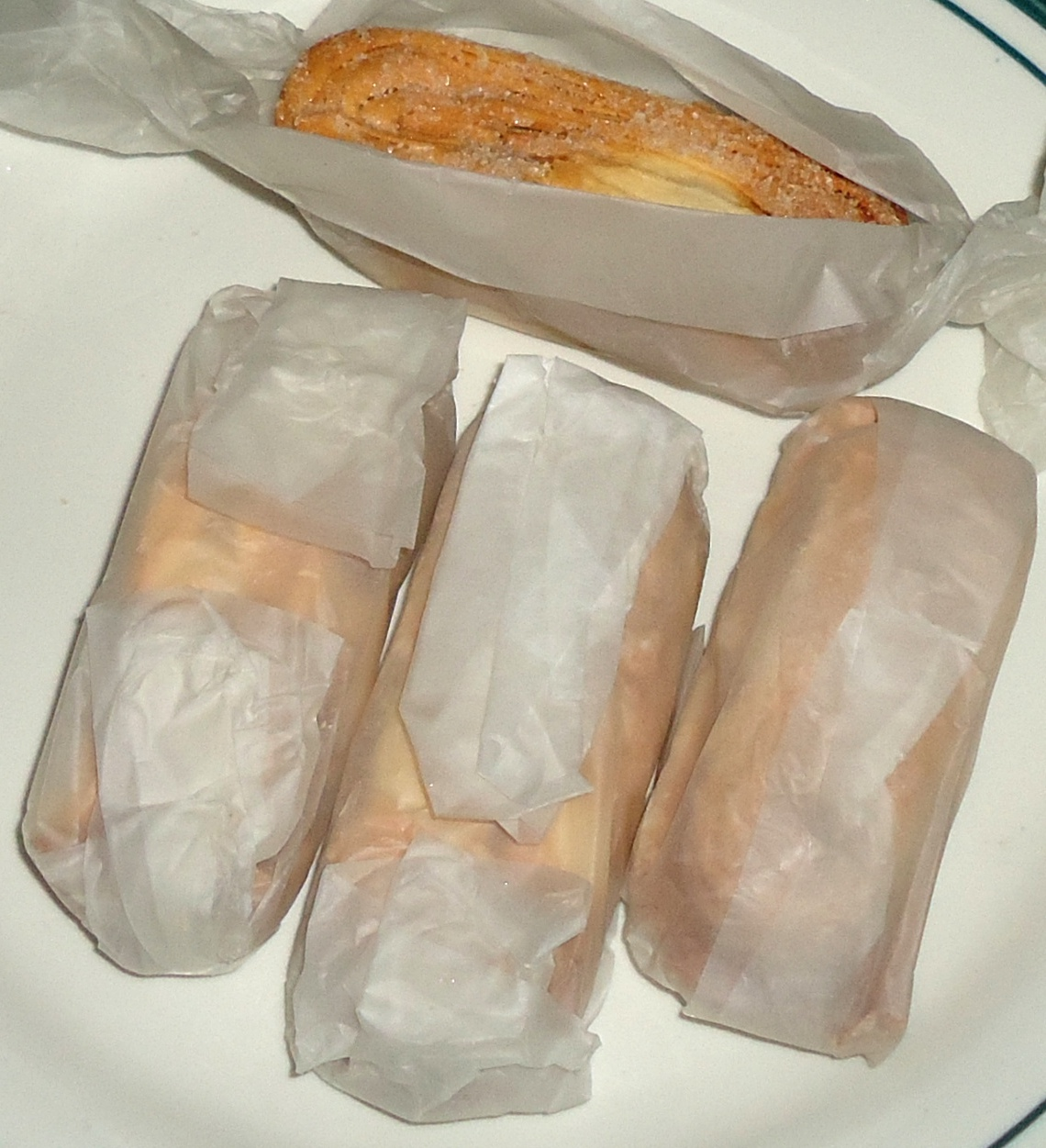
- Alternative names: Utap
- Type: Pastry
- Place of origin: Philippines
- Region or state: Cebu
- Main ingredients: Flour, shortening, coconut, and sugar

Otap (sometimes spelled utap) is an oval-shaped puff pastry cookie from the Philippines, especially common in Cebu where it originated. It usually consists of a combination of flour, shortening, coconut, and sugar. It is similar to the French palmier cookies, but otap are oval-shaped and more tightly layered and thinner, making it crispier. In order to achieve the texture of the pastry, it must undergo an eleven-stage baking process.

== See also ==
- Hojaldres
- Apas (biscuit)
- Palmier
