= Spanish influence on Filipino culture =

The Spanish influence on Filipino culture originated from the Spanish East Indies, which was ruled from Mexico City and Madrid. A variety of aspects of the customs and traditions in the Philippines today can be traced back to Spanish and Novohispanic (Mexican) influence.

== Background ==
Spanish settlement in the Philippines first took place in the 1500s, during the Spanish colonial period of the islands, which were ruled as a territory of New Spain (Mexico), until the independence of the Mexican empire in 1821; thereafter they were ruled from Spain itself. The conquistador Miguel López de Legazpi left New Spain and founded the first Spanish settlement in Cebu in 1565 and later established Manila as the capital of the Spanish East Indies in 1571. The Philippine Islands are named after King Philip. Spaniards are referred to by Filipinos as "Kastila" (Castilian) named after the former Kingdom of Castile, now a region of Spain. The small population of Filipinos which have Spanish ancestry are descendants of people from Spain and New Spain (Mexico) who came during the colonial era. Another term for them is Spanish Filipino.

== History before Hispanization ==
Some of the societies scattered in the islands remained isolated but many evolved into states that developed substantial trade and contacts with the peoples of Eastern and Southern Asia, including those from India, China, Japan and other Austronesian islands (The Malay Archipelago).

The 1st millennium saw the rise of the harbor principalities and their growth into maritime states composed of autonomous barangays independent of, or allied with larger nations which were either Malay thalassocracies, led by Datus or Indianized kingdoms governed by Rajahs.

== Language ==
Philippine Spanish (Spanish: Español Filipino, Castellano Filipino) is a variant of standard Spanish spoken in the Philippines. It is a Spanish dialect of the Spanish language.

Chavacano, a Spanish-based creole, is spoken in the Zamboanga Peninsula (where it is an official language), Davao, and Cotabato in Mindanao, and Cavite in Luzon.

In addition to English, Filipinos today speak a variety of languages including Cebuano, Tagalog, Ilocano, Ilonggo, and Bikolano, all of which are 90% Austronesian languages, and contain several Spanish loanwords. Despite years of colonial rule, the Philippines retained its culture and various languages.

The most common languages spoken in the Philippines today are English and Filipino, the national language that is a standardised form of Tagalog. Spanish was an official language of the country until immediately after the People Power Revolution in February 1986 and the subsequent ratification of the 1987 Constitution. The new charter dropped Spanish as an official language and today it is very rare to find a native Spanish speaker, less than 0.1% of the population.

However, the government of Gloria Macapagal Arroyo, the fourteenth president of the Philippines and a Hispanophone, reintroduced the study of Spanish into the state school system.

== Name of the Philippines ==
The name of the Philippines comes from the king of Spain Philip II. It was given by the Spanish explorer Ruy López de Villalobos who named the islands of Samar and Leyte "Las Islas Felipinas" (The Philippine Islands), during his expedition in 1543. Throughout the colonial period, the name Felipinas (Philippines) was used, and became the official name of the Philippines.

There are many provinces in the Philippines with Spanish names, such as Nueva Vizcaya, Nueva Écija (Nueva Ecija), Laguna, Isabela, Quirino, Aurora, La Unión (La Union), Marinduque, Antique, Negros Occidental, Negros Oriental, Nueva Segovia and Valle de Compostela.

Many cities and towns are also named in Spanish, such as Medellin, La Libertad, Naga, Camarines Sur (prior to 1919 was known as Nueva Cáceres), Las Piñas, Prosperidad, Isabela, Sierra Bullones, Angeles, La Paz, Esperanza, Buenavista, Pilar, La Trinidad, Garcia Hernandez, Trece Martires, Los Baños, and many more. There are numerous other towns and cities named after saints, such as San Fernando, Santa Rosa, San Isidro, San José, San Juan and San Pablo, as well as after Spanish places like Madrid, Santander, Toledo, Cádiz, Valencia, Murcia, Lucena, and Pamplona.

Other native Filipino names are spelled using Spanish orthography, such as Cagayán de Oro, Parañaque, and Cebú.

=== Filipino Spanish surnames ===
A Spanish or Latin-sounding surname does not necessarily denote Spanish ancestry in the Philippines. The names were adopted when a Spanish naming system was implemented.

After the Spanish conquest of the Philippine islands, many early Christianized Filipinos assumed surnames based on religious instruments or the names of saints. This resulted in many people surnamed "de Los Santos" ("of the Saints"), "de la Cruz" ("of the Cross"), "del Rosario" ("of the Rosary"), "Bautista" ("Baptist"), and "de Jesus" ("of Jesus").

On November 21, 1849, the Spanish Governor-General of the Philippine Islands, Narciso Clavería, decreed the systematic distribution of surnames and the implementation of the Spanish naming system for the Filipinos. This produced the Catálogo alfabético de apellidos ("Alphabetical Catalogue of Surnames") listing Hispanicized Chinese and Filipino words, names, and numbers. Surnames of Spanish nobility and several colonial administrators, which include the preposition de as a nobiliary particle, were explicitly prohibited. Many names which resulted are not common to the Hispanophone world, because they were Hispanicized from the original Filipino or Chinese. This new naming system also did away with the Filipino custom of siblings taking different surnames.

== Religion ==
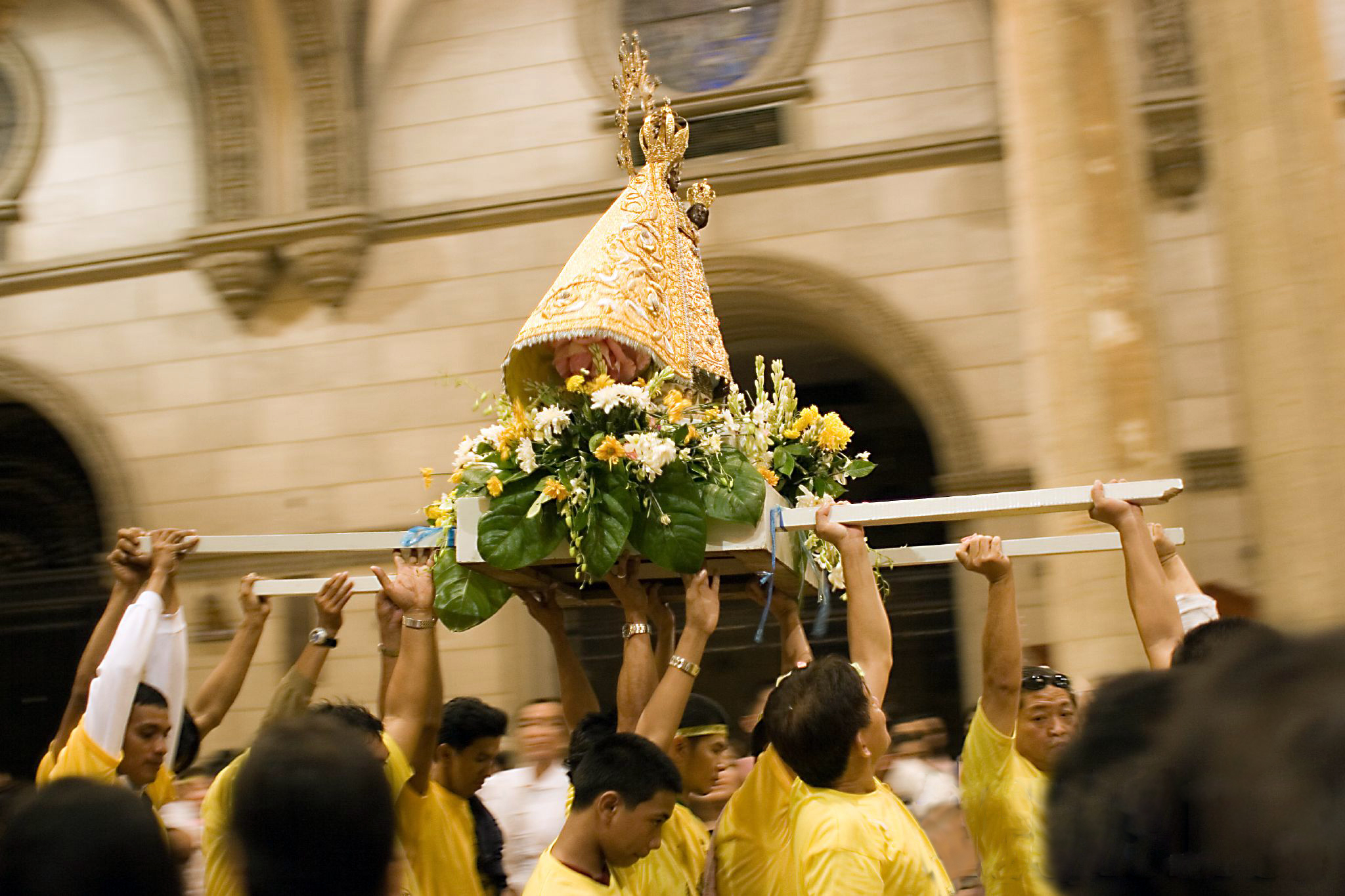
The statue of Our Lady of Peñafrancia in procession to the high altar of Manila Cathedral.

The Philippines is one of two predominantly Christian countries in Asia, the other being East Timor. About 81% of the population is Catholic, 11% belong to Protestant or other Christian denominations, 5.6% are Muslim, and about 2% practice other religions or are irreligious.

Filipinos at home set up altars in the Hispanic tradition adorned with Catholic images, flowers, and candles. During fiestas, most communities organise church services and religious processions in honor of a patron saint, hold funfairs and concerts, and feast with a variety of Filipino foods.

=== Festivities ===
All major Christian holidays are observed as official national holidays in the Philippines. Spanish culture and Christianity has influenced the customs and traditions of the Philippines.

Every year on the 3rd Sunday of January, the Philippines celebrates the festival of the "Santo Niño" (Holy Child Jesus), the largest being held in Cebu City.

=== Holidays ===
- January 1 – New Year's Day (Bagong Taon)
- March or April – Semana Santa (Holy Week or Easter)
- October 31 to November 2 – Day of the Dead, Araw ng mga Kaluluwa (All Souls' Day), and Todos Los Santos (All Saints' Day) where families spend much of the 3 days and 3 evenings visiting their ancestral graves, showing respect and honoring the departed relatives by feasting, decorating and offering prayers.
- December 24 – Nochebuena (The Good night or Christmas Eve)
- December 25 – Christmas (Pasko)

== Arts, literature and music ==
Hispanic influence is based on Indigenous, and European tradition. Folk dance, music and literature have remained intact in the 21st century. These were introduced from Spain in the 16th century and can be regarded as largely Hispanic in the constitution, which has remained in the Philippines for centuries.

== Cuisine ==
The cuisine in the Philippines reflects the influences of Spanish, Mexican and Asian cuisine.

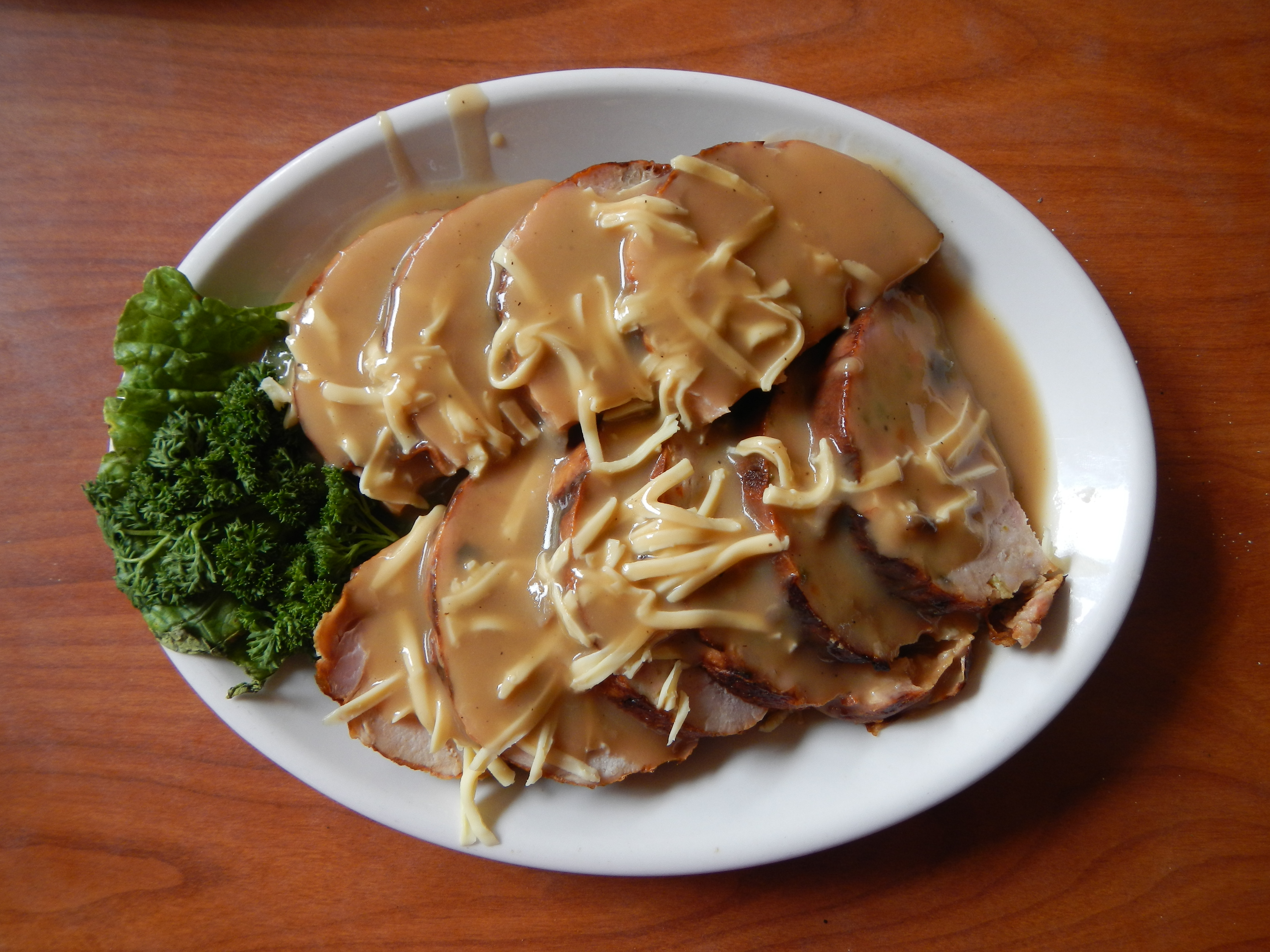
Chicken galantina (Baliuag, Bulacan).

They include:

- Afritada
- Albóndigas
- Arroz a la valenciana
- Arroz caldo
- Bistek
- Brazo de Mercedes
- Caldereta
- Champorado
- Galantina
- Chicharrón
- Chorizo
- Dulce de membrillo
- Dulce de leche
- Empanadas
- Estufado
- Ensaymadas
- Escabeche
- Espasol
- Flan
- Jamonada or Endulzado
- Galletas
- Jamón
- Lechón
- Longaniza
- Lúgaw
- Maíz con hielo
- Mantequilla
- Mazapán
- Mechado
- Menudo
- Natilla
- Paella
- Pan de sal
- Pastel de lengua
- Pastillas de leche
- Pescado
- Picadillo
- Pionono
- Putsero
- Polvorón
- Quezo de Bola
- Relleno
- Tamale
- Torta del cielo
- Tortas
- Tortilla quesada
- Tocino
- Tocino del cielo
- Turrones de Casuy

== Business ==
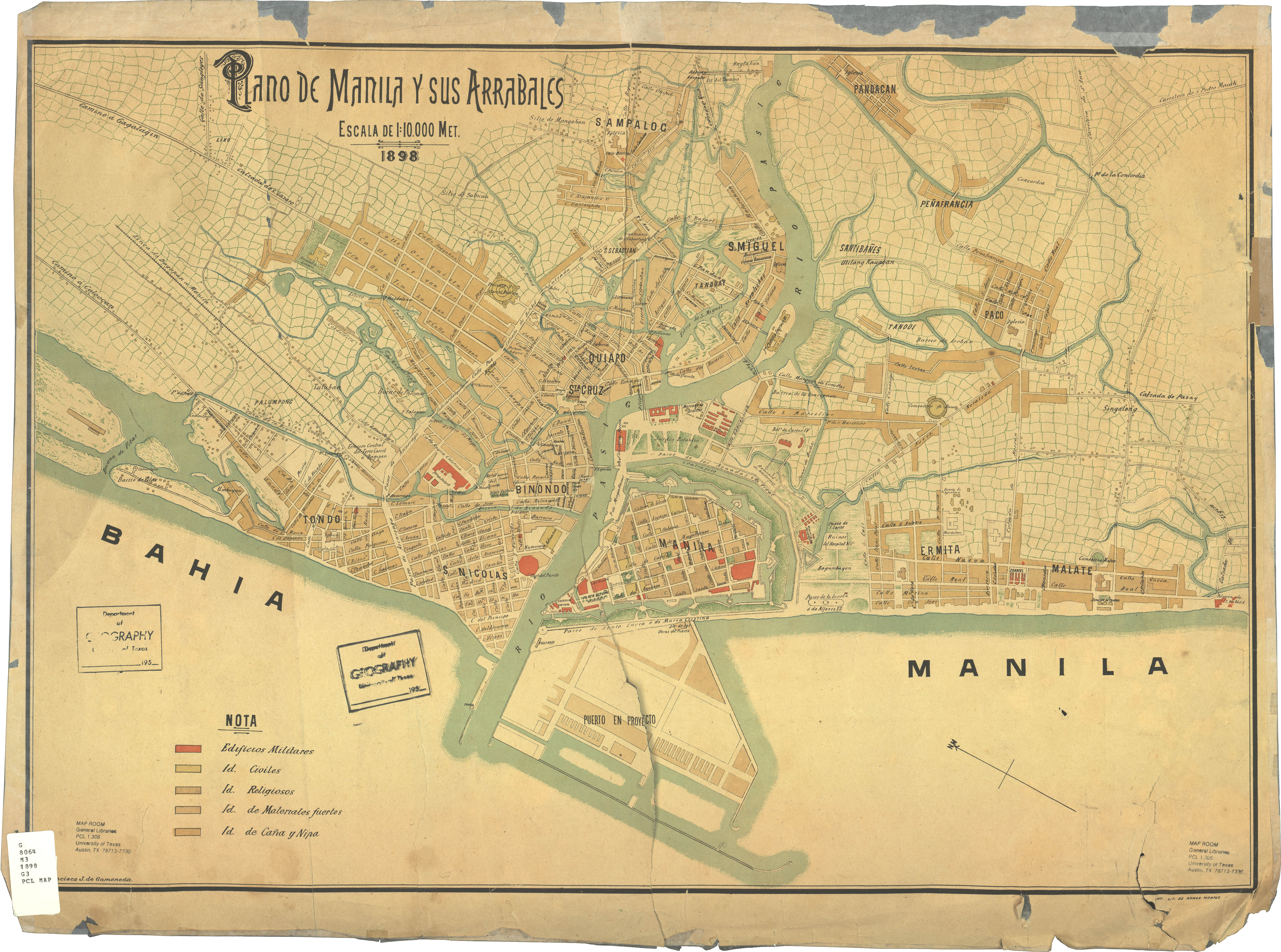
Map of Manila, 1898.

In the business community, the Philippine Chamber of Commerce and Industry (PCCI) plays an integral role in the economic, political and social development of the nation. Historically, the chamber can be traced back as early as the 1890s with the inauguration of the Cámara de Comercio de Filipinas. This organisation was composed mainly of Spanish companies such as the Compañia General de Tabacos de Filipinas, Fábrica de Cerveza San Miguel, and Elizalde y Cía, among other Spanish, and Philippine companies.

During the first half of the 20th-century commerce, and industrial trades with other Hispanic countries declined due to the United States administration of the Philippines and the Second World War. However, the resurgence of trade between Spain and Latin American nations had risen toward the closing of the century. 1998 marked the centennial celebration of Philippine independence and opened a new opportunity for both Hispanic and Filipino businesses to reconnect their historic ties as trade partners.

== See also ==
- Hispanic culture
- Culture of the Philippines
- Latin Union
- Philippines education during Spanish rule
