= Kinamatisang manok =

Filipino chicken and tomato stew

- Alternative names: Sarciadong manok, sarsiadong manok
- Course: Main dish
- Place of origin: The Philippines
- Serving temperature: Hot
- Main ingredients: Chicken, tomatoes

Kinamatisang manok literally means "chicken cooked with tomatoes." It is a Filipino stew of chicken braised with tomatoes, long green chili (siling mahaba), garlic, onion, bay leaves, fish sauce, and black peppercorns, often including vegetables like carrots, potatoes, pechay, green peas, or green beans. It is similar to chicken afritada and menudo, but distinct because it traditionally uses whole fresh tomatoes (especially small, indigenous yellow‑orange ones), rather than tomato sauce. This gives the dish a rich orange hue, though modern recipes sometimes substitute tomato sauce or paste, which produces a redder color. It is typically served with white rice.

== History ==
Kinamatisang manok likely developed as a simple Filipino home-style stew combining native chicken with readily available tomatoes, garlic, and onions. The name comes from Tagalog kamatis (tomato). Traditional versions use fresh, indigenous tomatoes, producing a rich orange-colored broth. Fish sauce is often added for umami, and siling mahaba provides mild heat, reflecting regional flavor preferences. The dish is a fixture in many households due to its simplicity and reliance on common, affordable ingredients.

== Variants ==
- Some versions do not add pechay until near the end of cooking to maintain the leaves' crisp texture.
- Potatoes and siling mahaba are commonly included to give the stew more body and a subtle spiciness.
- While traditional recipes rely on fresh tomatoes, modern adaptations often use tomato paste or sauce, resulting in a thicker, deeper-colored broth.
- A pork variant, kinamatisang baboy, uses the same tomato-based sauce but substitutes pork for chicken.

== See also ==
- Afritada
- Menudo
- Kaldereta
- Sarsiado
