= Lengua estofado =

Filipino beef tongue stew

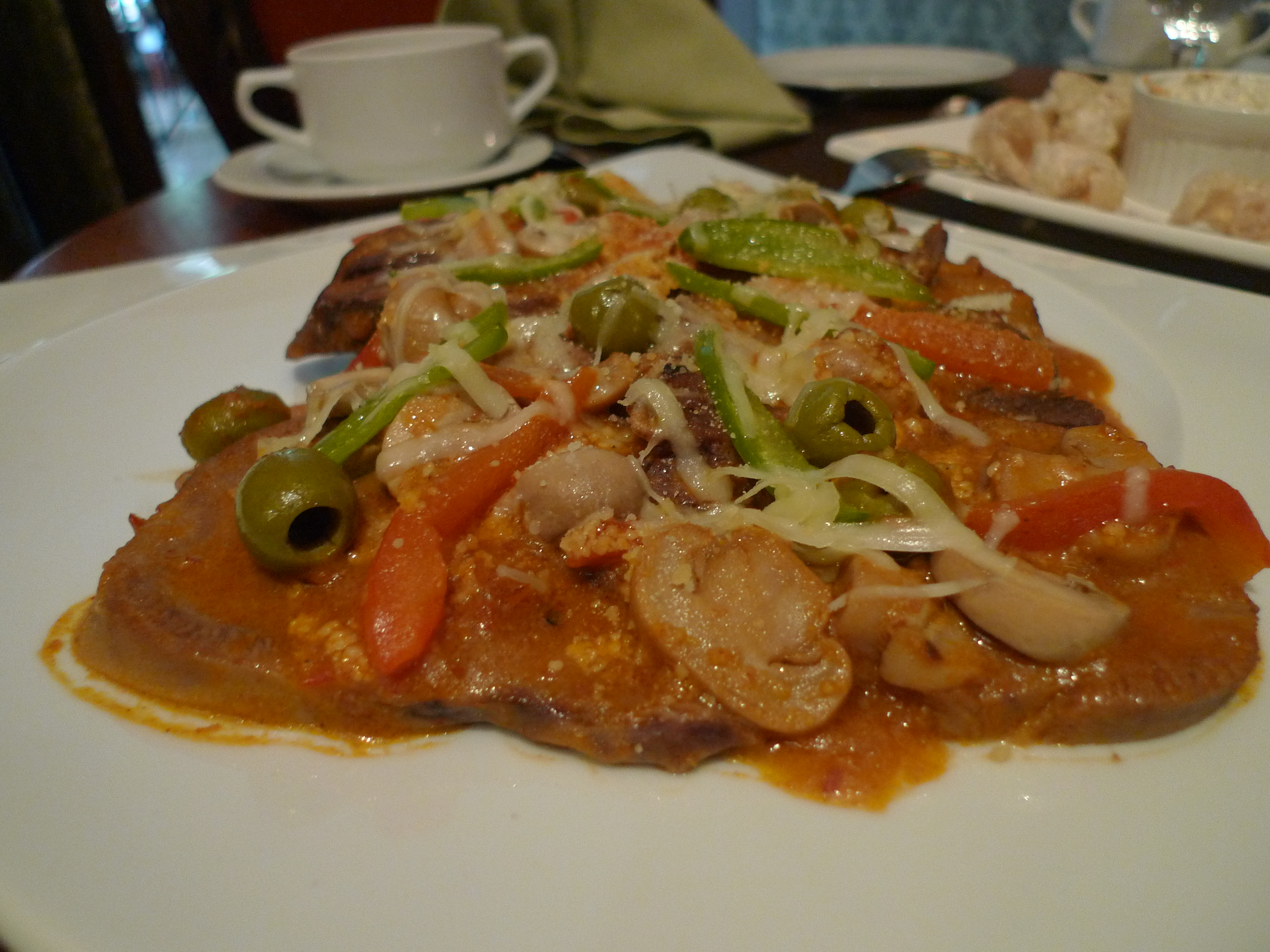
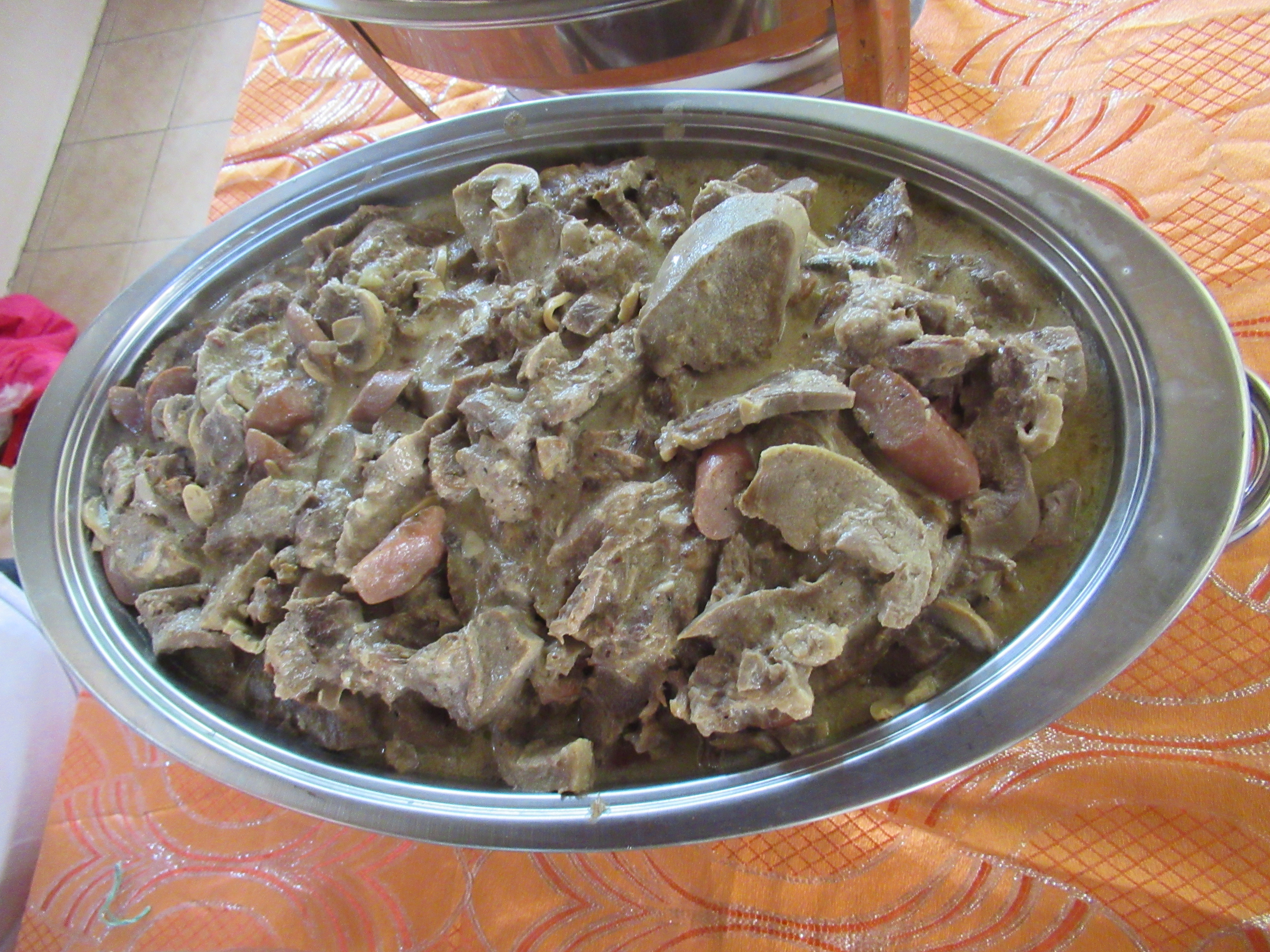
- Top: Lengua estofado in a tomato-based sauce, with olives, bell peppers, and mushrooms Bottom: Lengua estofado in a cream-based white sauce, with potatoes, mushrooms, and Vienna sausages
- Alternative names: Lengua estofada, lengua
- Course: Main course
- Place of origin: Philippines
- Main ingredients: beef tongue
- Similar dishes: Estofado de lengua

Lengua estofado (lit. "tongue stew" in Spanish), sometimes known as lengua estofada or simply lengua, is a Filipino dish consisting of braised beef tongue in a sweet sauce with saba bananas, potatoes, or mushrooms. It originates from the similar Spanish and Latin American dish estofado de lengua but differs significantly in the ingredients. The dish is prominent in the regional cuisines of the Kapampangan, Ilonggo, and Negrense people. It is usually prepared for Christmas dinner and other special occasions.

== Description ==
Recipes of lengua estofado are extremely variable, ranging from preparations very similar to the original estofado de lengua to versions which use ingredients unique to the Philippines. A unifying similarity between the different lengua estofado recipes in the Philippines is that they use soy sauce, vinegar, and sugar for the sauce, which are absent in the Spanish versions.

The most distinctive variant of lengua estofado is found in Ilonggo cuisine in the Western Visayas islands. It typically uses a sauce made with muscovado or brown sugar, coconut vinegar (or palm wine, tubâ), black pepper, soy sauce, bay leaves, anisado wine, onion, and garlic. Its ingredients, other than beef tongue, typically includes potatoes, pineapple slices, and uniquely, saba bananas. Other lengua estofado recipes are closer to the Spanish version. Instead of bananas, they typically add mushrooms, as well as carrots, olives, paprika, and optionally, white wine. The sauce can optionally be tomato-based, in which case its preparation becomes very similar to other Filipino dishes like estofadong baboy and caldereta. The beef tongue component can be switched with meat, including beef, goat, pork, or even chicken.

== Other variants ==
Lengua pastel from Pampanga is a variant that is cooked in a creamy white sauce with button mushrooms and young corn kernels. In Bulacan, lengua Sevillana or lengua a la Sevillana is a variant which adds sherry or red wine to the sauce and is typically eaten with bringhe.

== See also ==
- Estofadong baboy
- Menudo (stew)
- Mechado
- Caldereta
- Chicken pastel
