= Pininyahang manok =

Filipino chicken dish

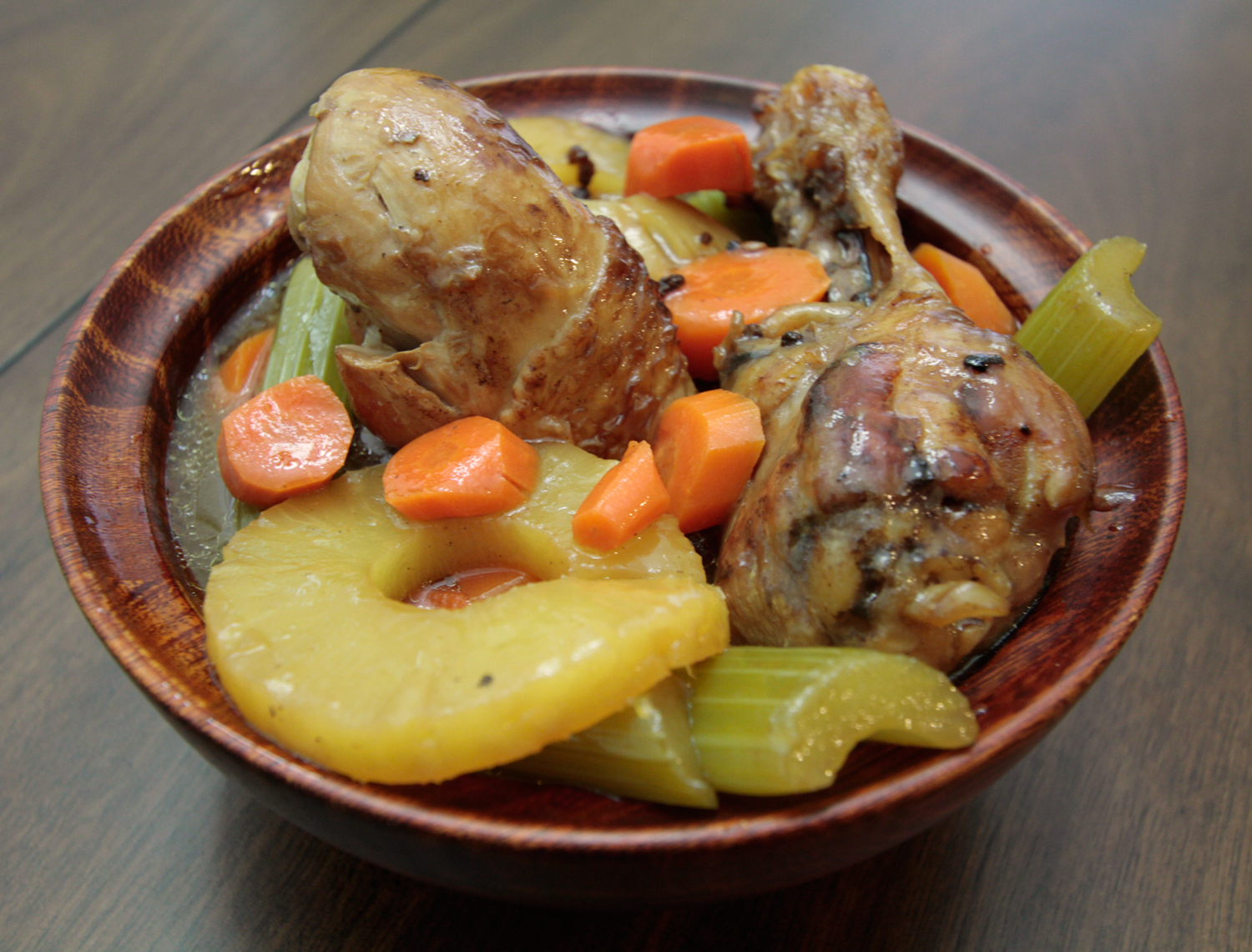
- Alternative names: Pineapple chicken
- Course: Main dish
- Place of origin: Philippines
- Region or state: Southern Luzon
- Main ingredients: chicken, pineapples, potatoes, carrots, bell peppers, milk (or coconut milk)
- Similar dishes: hamonado, afritada

Pininyahang manok, commonly anglicized as pineapple chicken, is a Philippine dish consisting of chicken braised in a milk or coconut milk-based sauce with pineapples, carrots, potatoes, and bell peppers. Some variants of the dish use a chicken stock base instead of milk. The dish originates from Southern Luzon which was once a regional center of pineapple fiber (Spanish: piña) production in the Spanish Philippines.

== Description ==
Pininyahang manok is made by first marinating the chicken in pineapple juice, though some recipes skip this part. The chicken is then fried in oil with garlic and onions until lightly browned. Water with a small amount of evaporated milk or condensed milk is then added, along with pineapple chunks, diced carrots, potatoes, and bell peppers. Coconut milk or cream can also be used in place of milk. It is spiced with salt, sugar, black pepper, or fish sauce to taste, and left to simmer at low heat until the ingredients are thoroughly cooked.

The dish spoils easily because of the milk or coconut milk ingredients. A common variant of the dish excludes them completely, and instead simply uses chicken stock as the base. Cornstarch may be added to thicken the sauce in this case.

Vienna sausages, hot dogs, cheese, eggs, or diced tomatoes may also be added along with the other ingredients. It is served on white rice and garnished with scallions and, sometimes, cashews.

== Similar dishes ==
Pininyahang manok is similar to the version of chicken afritada with pineapples, but the latter uses tomato sauce. It is also similar to chicken hamonado, but the latter uses soy sauce. Both of these similar dishes do not use milk.

In Silang, Cavite, tomato sauce turns the dish reddish in color. In Batangas’ chicken with pineapple version, native chicken 'Banaba' is simmered in pure coconut milk with pineapple chunks, minced onion, chopped garlic, sliced carrot, potatoes cubes, chicken stock, and red-green bell pepper strips.

== See also ==
- Pininyahang hipon
- Ginataan
- Kare-kare
- Lemon chicken
- Orange chicken
- List of chicken dishes
- Sarsiado
- Tinola
