= Pork guisantes =

Hawaii-adapted Filipino pork stew

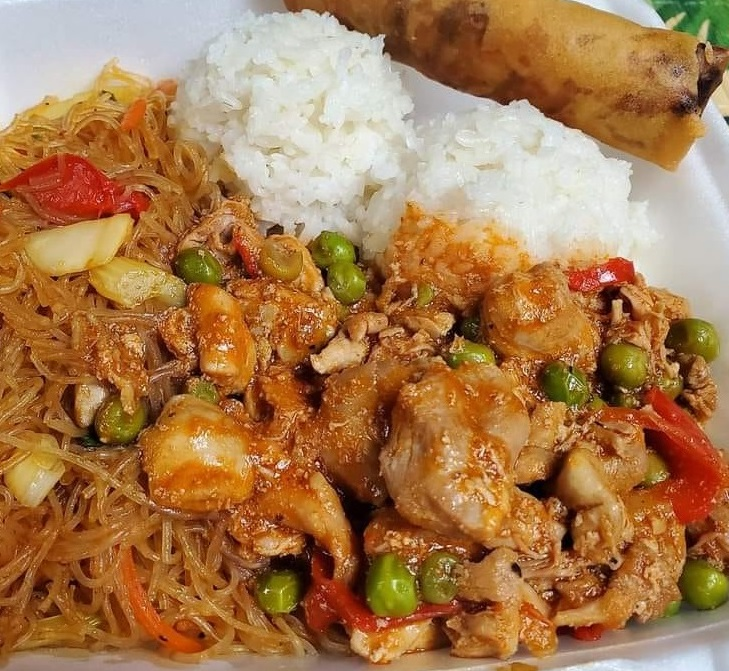
- Plate lunch with pork guisantes, pancit, lumpia and rice
- Alternative names: Guisantes, gisantes, pork & peas
- Type: Stew
- Course: Main
- Place of origin: Philippines
- Region or state: Hawaii
- Serving temperature: Hot
- Main ingredients: Pork, peas, tomato sauce, pimento (or capsicum)
- Variations: Chicken, chickpea
- Food energy (per serving): 300 kcal (1,300 kJ)
- Similar dishes: Igado, afritada, menudo, kaldereta, pork and beans

Pork guisantes (also spelled as gisantes) or pork and peas is a Hawaiian pork stew of Filipino origin. Pork is stewed in a tomato sauce base with peas. It is likely an adaptation of the Filipino dishes igado and afritada introduced by the Ilocanos from their arrival in the early 1900s who came to work in the fruit and sugar plantations. (Note: Ilocanos were and still are the predominant Filipino ethnic group in Hawaii)

Pork guisantes remains a popular Filipino-inspired dish catered to the Hawaiian palate. It is featured in ready-to-go bentos at convenience stores, served at local dine-in restaurants, offered as a plate lunch dish, or an in-flight meal option, and as an okazu item at a few okazuya.

== Ingredients ==
=== Meat ===
Unlike igado and menudo, pork guisantes does not contain liver. Rather, it is more partial to meat such as pork tenderloin or butt to cater to a wider population not accustomed to liver or other offal. (Note: Japanese were the largest ethnic group in Hawaii for a period and often considered offal, horumon (lit. "discarded bits"), undesirable.) A common option or substitution for pork is chicken, particularly skinless thigh meat.

=== Vegetables ===
Guisantes, or gisantes, is the Spanish loanword for "peas". Original recipes from the plantation era used canned peas which still can be used today. However, frozen peas are more common in contemporary recipes along with aromatic vegetables such as onions and garlic. Chickpeas can also be added or substituted for peas. Optionally, jar pimentos (or freshly sliced bell peppers) can be added.

Another key ingredient is tomato sauce or paste, which is very apparent in pork guisantes but optional in igado. (Note: Igado is occasionally reddened with annatto instead of tomatoes) It recalls other Filipino dishes such as afritada and menudo. (Note: Another key characteristic which differentiates pork guisantes from its Filipino progenitor is that it is generally soupier, whereas igado, afritada, and menudo are between a wet stir-fry and a dry stew) Like afritada, other vegetables such as potatoes and carrots can be added but are not typical to Hawaiian pork guisantes.

Lastly, the American dish pork and beans which is a canned food of beans packed in tomato sauce shares some semblance. (Note: Introduced in the late 1800s, it was a common C-ration until 1953; similarly distributed like SPAM during World War II)

=== Seasoning ===
Pork guisantes is characterized as a savory dish that pairs well with rice. It is typically seasoned with salt and shōyu (soy sauce) in place of, or along with, patis (fish sauce) and spiced with ground pepper. Adding bay leaves is common, while cinnamon sticks are optional.

== Preparation ==
The preparation of pork guisantes is rather straightforward in contemporary recipes since a few of the ingredients are canned, prepackaged, or readily found.

Pork is sliced into 1 x 1.5 inch slices and are sautéed in a little oil with the aromatic vegetables. Tomato sauce, water, and seasonings are added along with the spices, and simmered until the pork is tender. The peas are then added and finally garnished with pimentos.

== See also ==
- Afritada
- Igado
- Menudo (Filipino)
- Pork and beans
