= Balbacua =

Filipino beef stew

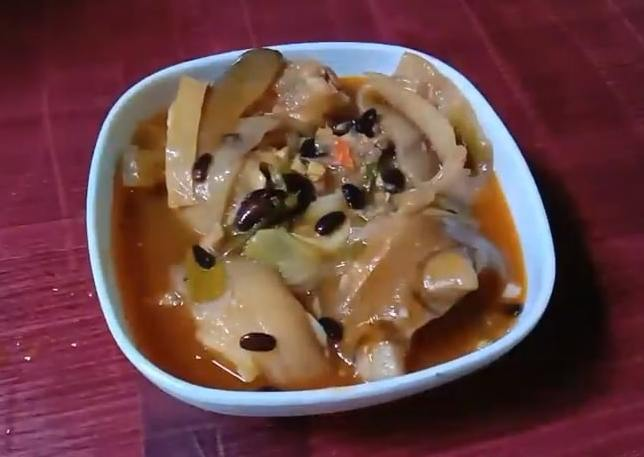
- Alternative names: Balbakwa, Balbakoa
- Course: Main course
- Place of origin: Philippines
- Region or state: Visayas, Mindanao
- Serving temperature: Hot
- Main ingredients: Beef

Balbacua, also spelled balbakwa or balbakoa, is a Filipino beef stew made from beef, collagen-rich beef parts (oxtail, skin, and joints), and various spices cooked for several hours until very tender. It is typically served with white rice or misua or miki noodles. It originates from the Visayan regions of the Visayas and Mindanao islands.

== Etymology ==
The name balbacua is derived from the Latin American dish barbacoa (which is also the source of the English word "barbecue"), though they are very different dishes. While balbacua is a beef stew, barbacoa is instead meat roasted in a pit. The dish was probably named by the Spanish due to the similarity in the length of time in cooking and the tenderness of the meat.

== Preparation ==
Balbacua has numerous variations when it comes to the spices and secondary ingredients used. A common aspect of the dish, however, is the use of collagen-rich parts of beef, including oxtail, skin, knuckles, and other cartilaginous beef cuts in addition to regular beef cuts. These are cooked for around four to six hours until the meat is falling off the bones and is very tender. The collagen from the skin and cartilage thickens the soup into a gelatinous consistency.

Common spices used include garlic, onion, black or white pepper, labuyo chilis, ginger or turmeric, annatto (achuete) oil, star anise (sangke), fermented black beans (tausi), bay leaves, coconut vinegar (sukang tuba), lemongrass (tanglad), fish sauce (patis), leeks or scallions, soy sauce or salt, calamansi, and so on. Secondary ingredients are similarly variable, including pechay, ground peanuts, baked beans, tomatoes, and saba bananas. Based on the ingredients, balbacua has sometimes been described as being a cross between puchero and kare-kare dishes.

Balbacua is typically served with white rice or with misua or miki noodles (the latter variants are differentiated as balbacua con misua and balbacua con miki, respectively).

== See also ==
- Kare-kare
- Mitsado
- Kaldereta
- List of beef dishes
- List of stews
