= Kare-kare =

Filipino stew dish

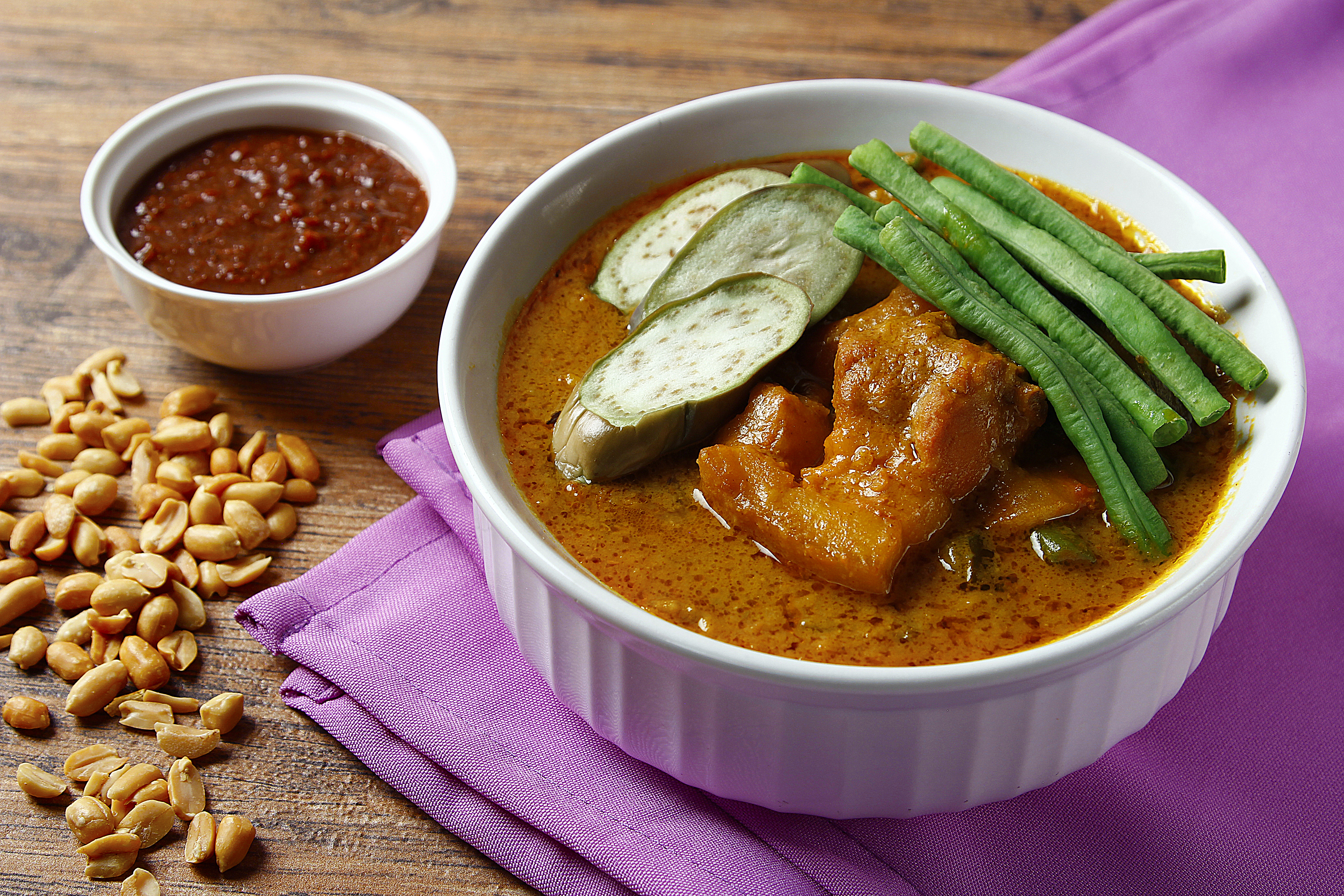
- A bowl of kare-kare
- Course: Main course
- Place of origin: Pampanga, Philippines
- Serving temperature: Hot
- Main ingredients: Oxtail, peanut sauce, vegetables
- Variations: Goat meat, vegetarian, and vegan kare-kare

Kare-kare is a Filipino dish featuring a thick savory peanut sauce. It is generally made from a base of stewed oxtail, beef tripe, pork hocks, calves' feet, pig's feet or trotters, various cuts of pork, beef stew meat, and occasionally offal. Vegetables, such as eggplant, Chinese cabbage, or other greens, daikon, green beans, okra, and asparagus beans, are added. The stew is flavored with ground roasted peanuts or peanut butter, onions, and garlic. It is colored with annatto and can be thickened with toasted or plain ground rice.

Condiments and other flavorings are usually added. It is often eaten with Bagoong (shrimp paste), sometimes spiced with chili, ginisáng bagoóng (spiced and sautéed shrimp paste), and sprinkled with calamansi juice. Other seasonings are added at the table. Variants may include goat meat or (rarely) chicken.

Traditionally, most Filipino fiestas have kare-kare. It is a complex dish to prepare, rich in umami flavor.

A more modern twist on the classic Filipino kare-kare uses a different dish as the main meat for this dish. Pork is one of the most economical and easiest meats to cook. The most common meats repurposed for kare-kare are lechon (which is also used for lechon kawali) and crispy pata (crispy pork shank). Alternative main proteins are tofu, beef chuck, beef shank, maskara ng baka, or cartilage from the cow's face, and tripe.

== History ==
Peanuts (Tagalog: mani) were introduced to the Philippine islands from Mexico in the 16th century via Spanish galleon trades. Mexicans themselves use peanuts as an ingredient in native savory stews like their encacahuatado. The exact conception of kare-kare however is disputed due to a lack of definitive primary sources.

The most often repeated history is that kare-kare is a direct innovation of Indian curries, coming from homesick Southern India sepoys who settled in the Philippines during the British occupation of Manila after they rebelled against their British masters. Peanuts as an curry base ingredient is relatively unknown in Indian curries, but are often used in cuisines across Maritime Southeast Asia. Curries in those cuisines (known in Malay: kari) were also made in Mindanao, leading to an alternative origin as a derivative of local forms of kari.

This leads to the final (and most likely) possible origin for kare-kare in Pampanga of Central Luzon known for sisig and menudo. Kapampangan kari was adapted from Moro dishes which features fresh spices and herbs used in Malay curries, but not often in Tagalog cooking; this lackness as well as the use of peanuts and pork led to creation of the very distinct kare-kare.

== Preparation ==
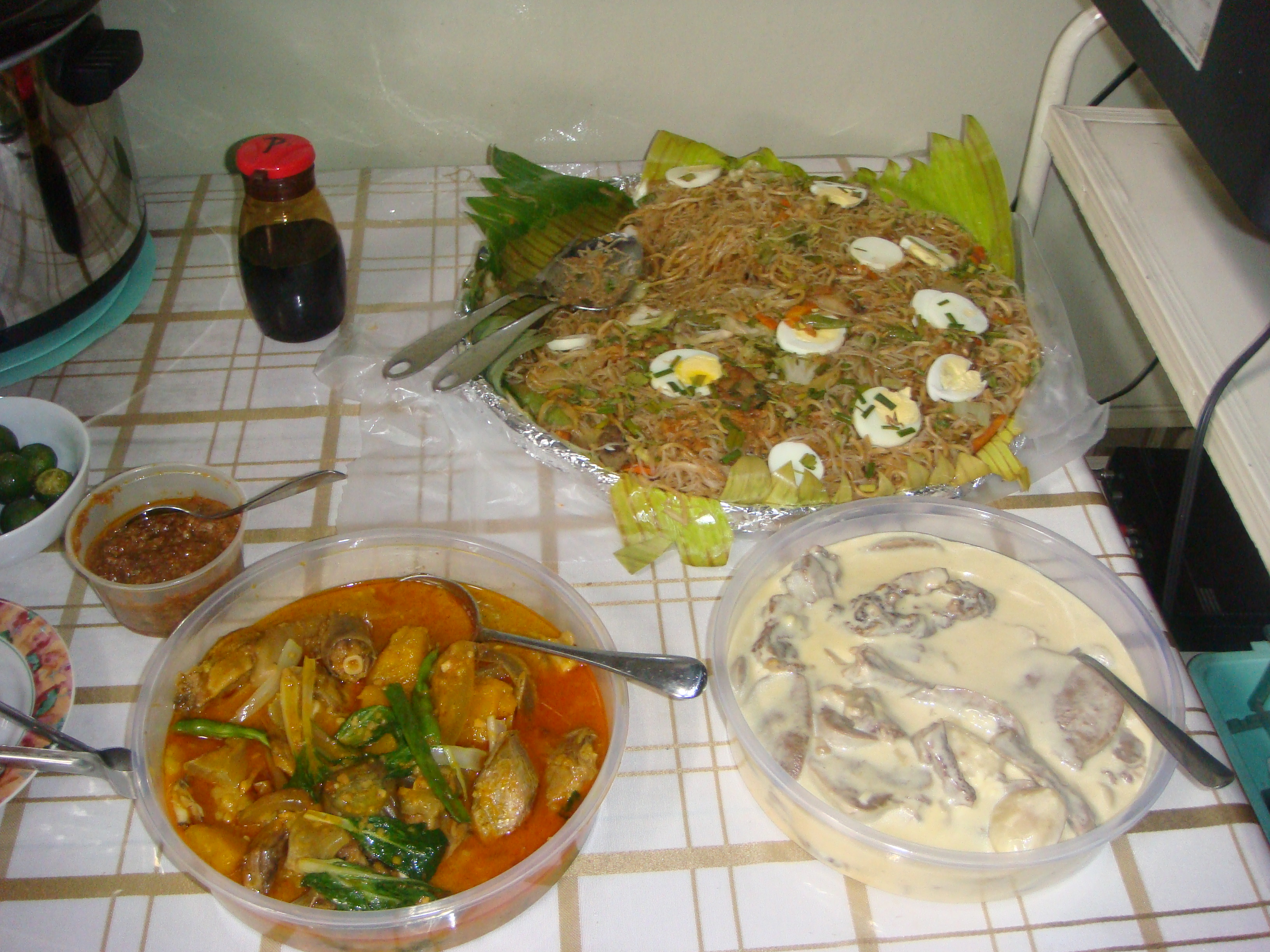
Kare-kare, lengua with white sauce and pancit canton-bihon

The oxtail (with the skin on) is cut into 2-inch lengths. The ox tripe is boiled until tender. Sometimes pieces of ox feet or shins are added. When the meat is tender, the soup becomes gelatinous. Ground roasted peanuts (or peanut butter) and ground roasted glutinous rice are added to make the soup thicker. Annatto is added to give color. The vegetables used for kare-kare include young banana flower bud or "heart" (puso ng saging), eggplant, string beans, and Chinese cabbage (pechay).

Kare-kare is often served hot with special bagoong alamang (sauteed salted shrimp paste). Vegan and Vegetarian versions emphasize the use of peanuts and coconuts to create the umami.

== See also ==
- Tortang Talong
- Indian Cuisine
- Adobo
- Afritada
- Balbacua
- Dinuguan
- Escabeche
- Kaldereta
- Mechado
- Menudo (stew)
- Sarsiado
- Tinola
- List of peanut dishes
- List of Philippine dishes
- List of stews
