= Paklay =

Filipino braised dishes

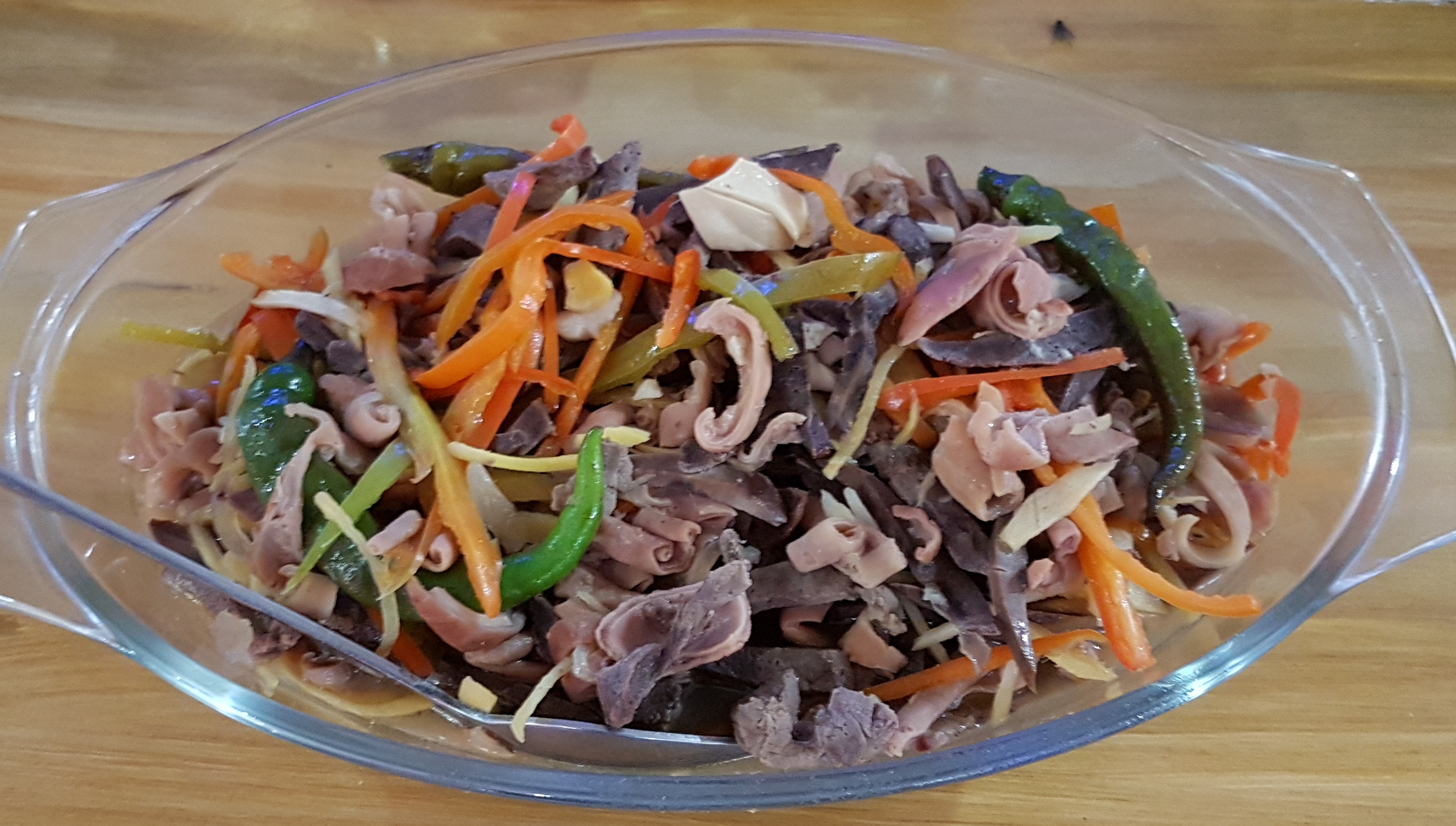
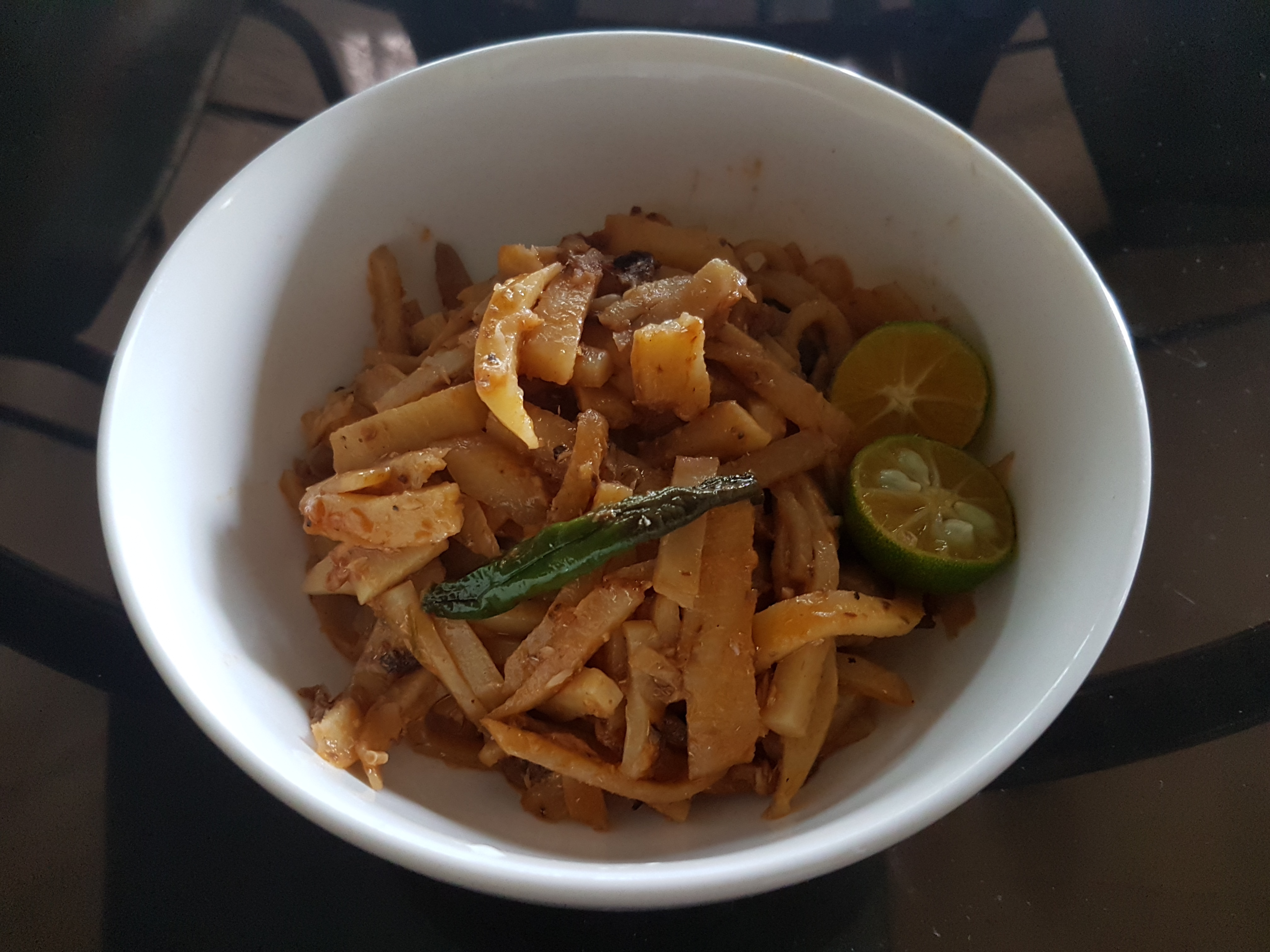
- Top: Mindanao paklay Bottom: Ilonggo paklay
- Course: main course, side dish
- Place of origin: Philippines
- Region or state: Visayas, Mindanao

Paklay is two different Filipino braised dishes from the Mindanao and Visayas Islands characterized by julienned ingredients. They are eaten with rice or served as pulutan (side dishes) with alcohol.

In Mindanao and Central and Eastern Visayas, it refers to a dish made from various beef, pork, or goat tripe with julienned ginger, bamboo shoots (labong), carrots, bell pepper, siling mahaba chilis and tomatoes, garlic, onions, and black pepper, among other ingredients. It is commonly slightly soured with fruits like pineapple, tamarind, or unripe starfruit.

Among the Hiligaynon people of Western Visayas, on the other hand, it refers to sautéed bamboo shoots with fish or shrimp, tomatoes, ground pork or beef, onions, garlic, and other spices.

== See also ==
- Igado
- Bopis
- Dinakdakan
- Dinuguan
