= Afritada =

Filipino meat and vegetable stew

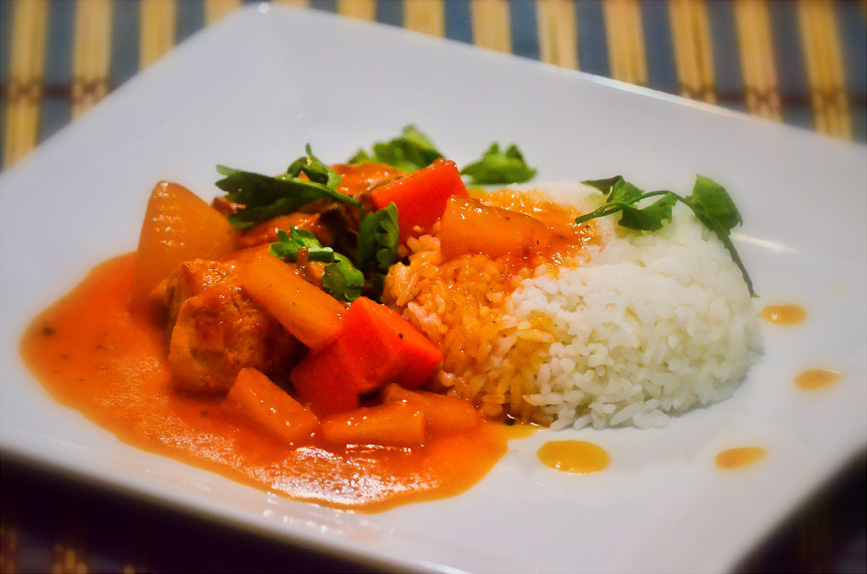
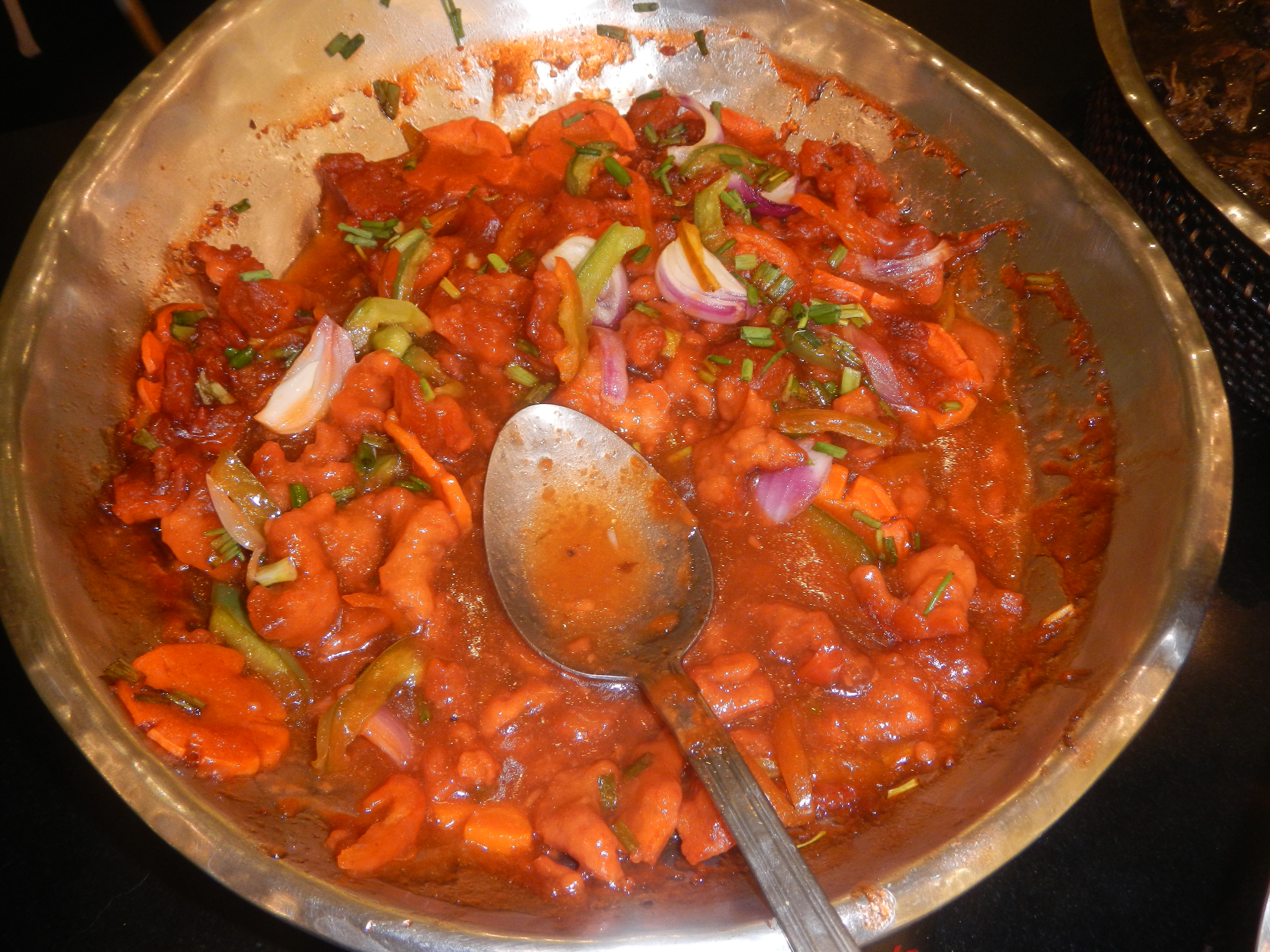
- Top: Chicken afritada on white rice, cooked hamonado-style (with pineapples); Bottom: Pork afritada
- Alternative names: Apritada, apretada
- Course: Main dish
- Place of origin: Philippines
- Serving temperature: Hot
- Main ingredients: Chicken/pork, tomato sauce (or banana ketchup), carrots, potatoes, red and green bell pepper
- Similar dishes: Menudo, kaldereta, hamonado, pininyahang manok, igado, guisantes

Afritada is a Philippine dish consisting of chicken, or pork braised in tomato sauce with carrots, potatoes, and red and green bell peppers. It is served on white rice and is a common Filipino meal. It can also be cooked with seafood.

== Etymology ==
The name afritada is derived from Spanish fritada ("fried"), referring to the first step of the preparation in which the meat is pan-fried before simmering in the tomato sauce.

== Description ==
Afritada is a braised dish. It is first made by sautéing diced meat with vegetables including onions, garlic, and tomato paste, carrots, potatoes and bell peppers and spices. The mixture is simmered until the vegetables are cooked. It is served on white rice.

== Variants ==
Afritada has different names based on the main ingredients of the dish. The most common ones are afritadang manok (chicken afritada), and afritadang baboy (pork afritada). Afritada can also be used to cook seafood like fish (afritadang isda) or mussels (afritadang tahong), utilizing the same basic process as when preparing meat afritadas.

Afritada is also commonly cooked hamonado-style (with pineapple chunks). This sweet variant is usually known as "pineapple afritada". It is commonly confused with pininyahang manok, braised chicken also made with pineapples. However, the latter does not use tomato sauce.

== Similar dishes ==
Filipino menudo and kaldereta both use tomato sauce or banana ketchup. However, menudo includes sliced liver, while kaldereta exclusively uses goat meat or occasionally beef. Igado contains liver but no tomato sauce.

== See also ==
- Adobo
- Ginataan
- Kare-kare
- Pinakbet
- Sarsiado
- Sinigang
- Tinola
