= Bopis =

Filipino dish

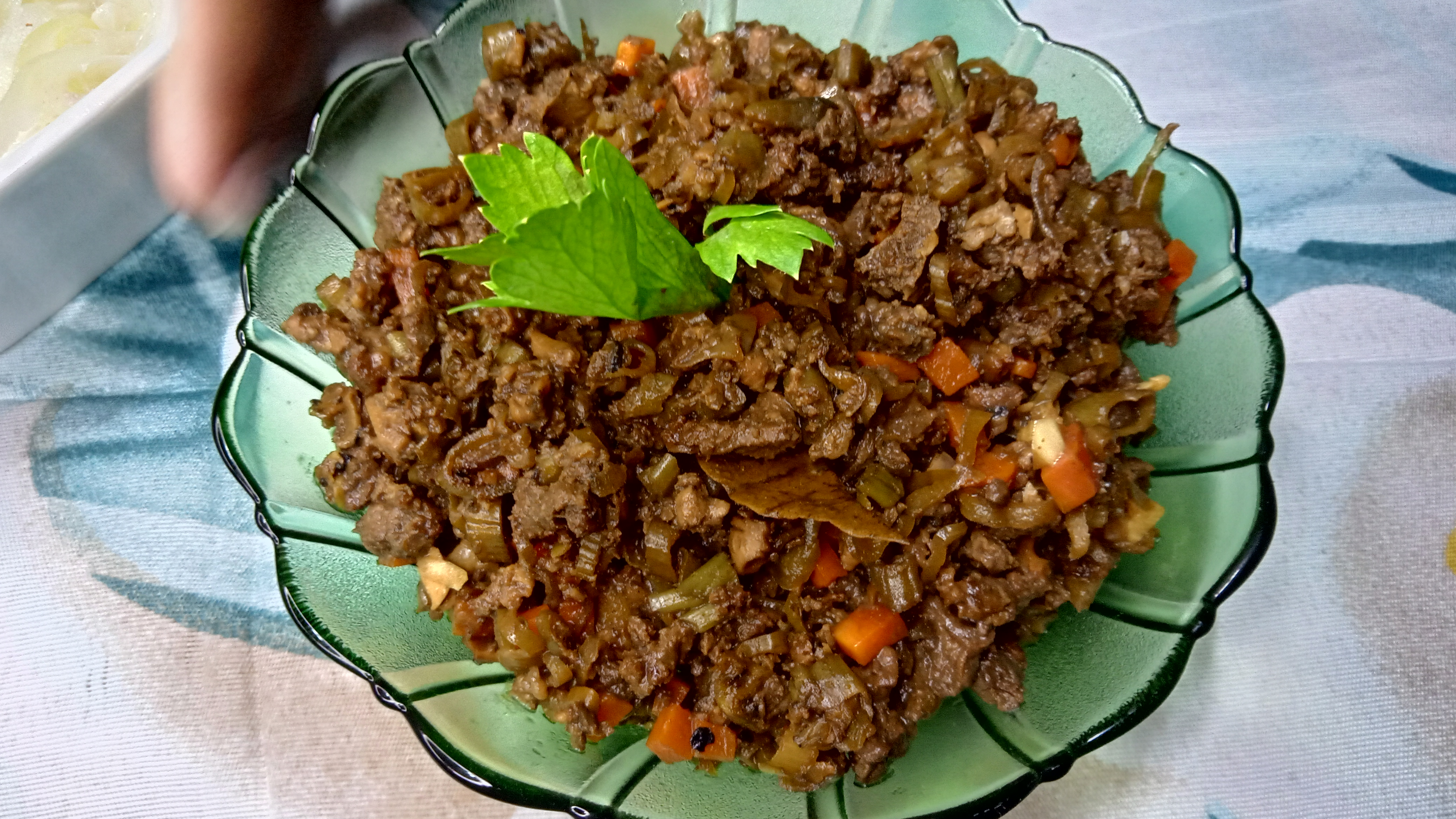
- Alternative names: Bópiz
- Place of origin: Philippines

Bopis (bópiz in Spanish) is a piquant Filipino dish of pork or beef lungs and heart sautéed in tomatoes, chilies and onions.

This spicy Filipino dish has Spanish origins, but the meaning in its original language, and even region of origin, are now lost. It could be Frito de Matanza, a variation of Frito Mallorquin.

== Preparation ==
It is sauteed and stir-fried (until crispy) with finely-chopped pig innards and cooked in onion, tomato, garlic, and pepper.

Recipes for bopis may differ from region to region and family to family, with regard to ingredients, spices and flavoring.

Classified as pulutan in Filipino cuisine, bopis is served with alcoholic beverages, or as a main dish with rice.

== See also ==
- Paklay
- Igado
