= Estofadong baboy =

Filipino dish composed of chicken/pork cooked in soy sauce and vinegar

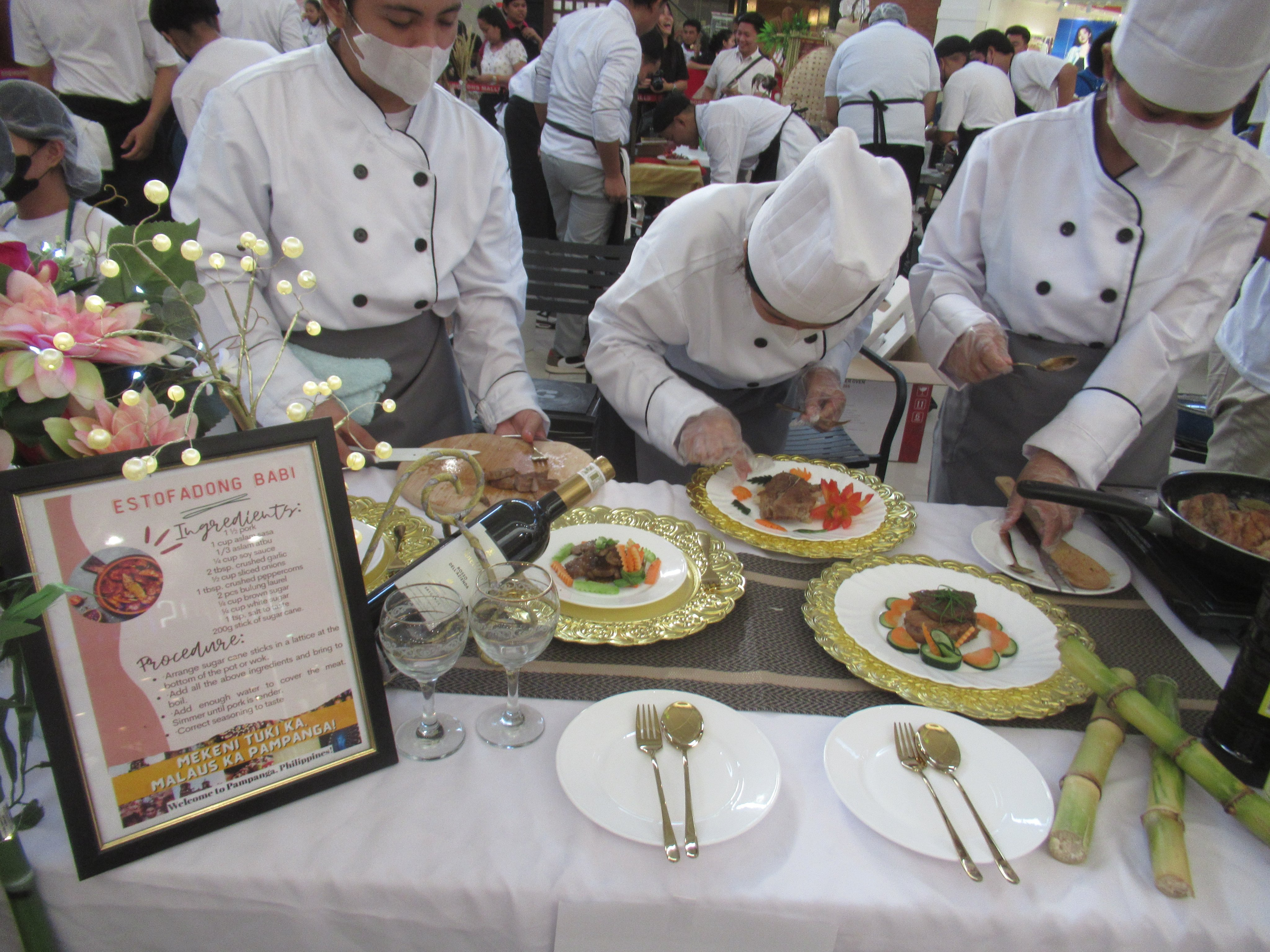
- A serving of estofadong baboy.
- Course: Main course
- Place of origin: Philippines
- Associated cuisine: Filipino cuisine
- Serving temperature: Hot
- Main ingredients: Pork, Vinegar, Soy sauce, Plantains, Carrots
- Food energy (per serving): 329 kcal (1,380 kJ)
- Similar dishes: Philippine adobo

Estofadong baboy (from Spanish estofar: "stew"; and Tagalog baboy: "pork"), also simply known as estofado or estufado, is a Filipino dish in Philippine cuisine similar to Philippine adobo that involves stewed pork cooked in vinegar and soy sauce with fried plantains, carrots and sausages.

== See also ==
- Lengua estofado
- Philippine adobo
