= Encacahuatado =

Mexican dish with meat and peanuts

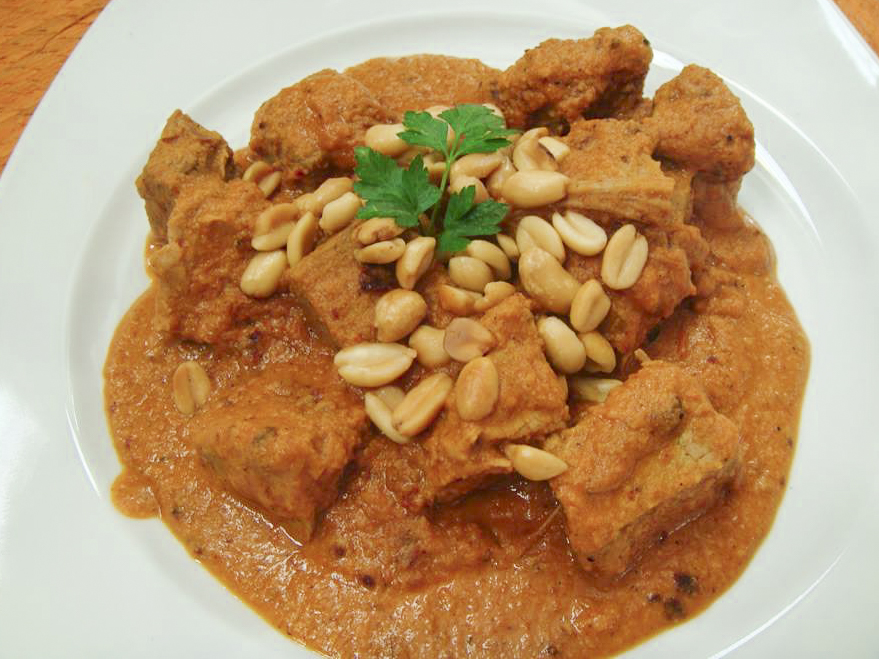
- Type: mole
- Main ingredients: meat · peanuts · dried chiles · spice · garlic · onion

Encacahuatado is a typical Mexican dish that consists of a thick peanut-like sauce with tomato, dried chili, sesame seeds ground and roasted together. The sauce is then stewed with chicken, pork, or beef.

Because of its laborious preparation process, it is reserved for festive events such as birthdays, although it can also be found as an everyday meal.

Encacahuatado is a common stew in the central region of Veracruz, where it is commonly made with pork. In Oaxaca, on the other hand, chicken meat is preferred, as it is in Sierra Norte de Puebla.

== See also ==
- Kare-kare
