= Sarsiado =

Filipino fish dish with tomatoes and eggs

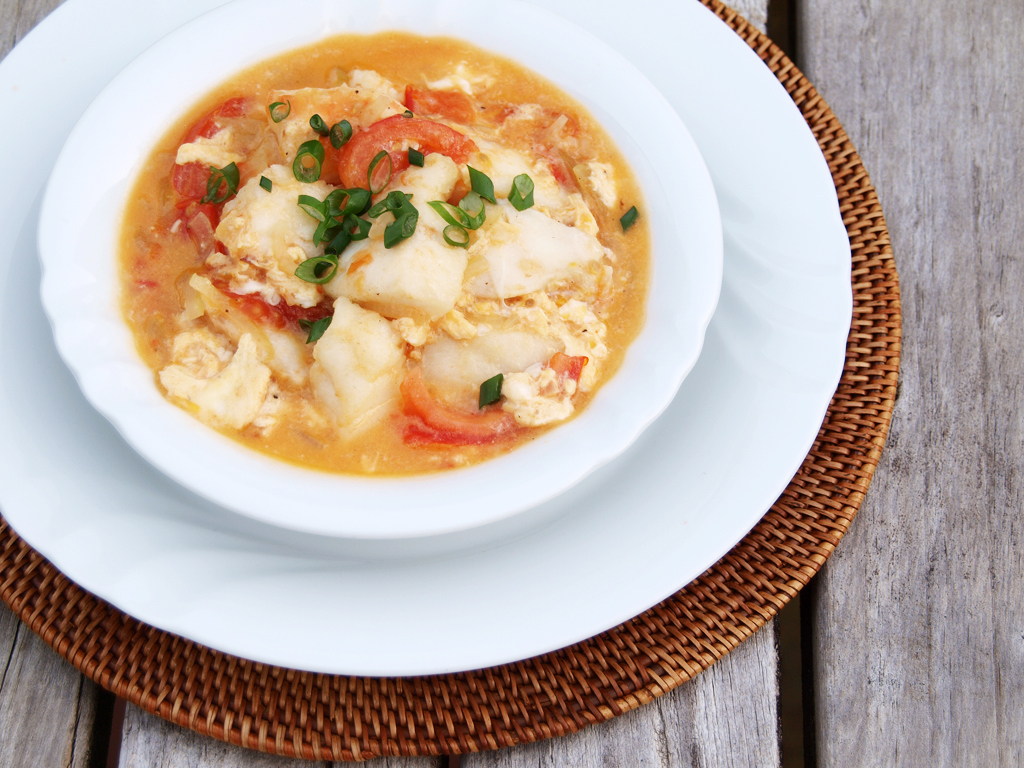
- Course: Main course
- Place of origin: The Philippines
- Serving temperature: Hot
- Main ingredients: Fish, tomato, eggs

Sarsiado (also sometimes spelled as sarciado) is a fish dish from the Philippines which features tomatoes and eggs.

The name sarsiado comes from the Tagalog word sarsa, meaning “sauce,” which is derived from the Spanish word salsa. The term reflects the dish’s defining characteristic of fish cooked in a thick sauce made with tomatoes and beaten eggs.

== Origin and preparation ==
Sarsiado is a fish dish from the Philippines that features a sauce predominantly composed of tomatoes and eggs. The bangus (or milkfish) is cleaned by removing the gills and other parts, rubbed with salt and then washed afterwards to remove blood and other scum. It is then fried (usually shallow-fried, but deep-fried is not unheard of) at a high temperature until the fish is cooked. The sarsa is then cooked in a separate saucepan—garlic, onions, and tomatoes are sauteed—in that order until cooked (with water sometimes added for moisture), and then beaten eggs are added and cooked to a rare doneness. A souring element as well as a sweetening one may be added to the sarsa. Other fishes such as tilapia are sometimes used in lieu of milkfish.

The sauce features a guisado: a sauté flavor combination of garlic, onion and tomatoes (although tomatoes are sometimes omitted, depending on the dish).

The dish is essentially a combination of two separate dishes: piniritong isda (fried fish), and tomato-scrambled eggs (for the sarsa), similar to Chinese stir-fried tomato and scrambled eggs.

A similar dish is the Philippine version of escabeche, which also features fried fish topped with a sauce.

== Variants ==
Some variants of sarsiado include the use of salted dried fish (daing) or different local fish varieties. While the preparation remains largely the same, the choice of fish may alter the flavor and texture of the dish.

== See also ==
- Adobo
- Kaldereta
- Kare-kare
- Kinamatisang manok (Sarciadong manok)
- List of fish dishes
- List of tomato dishes
