= Igado =

Filipino dish

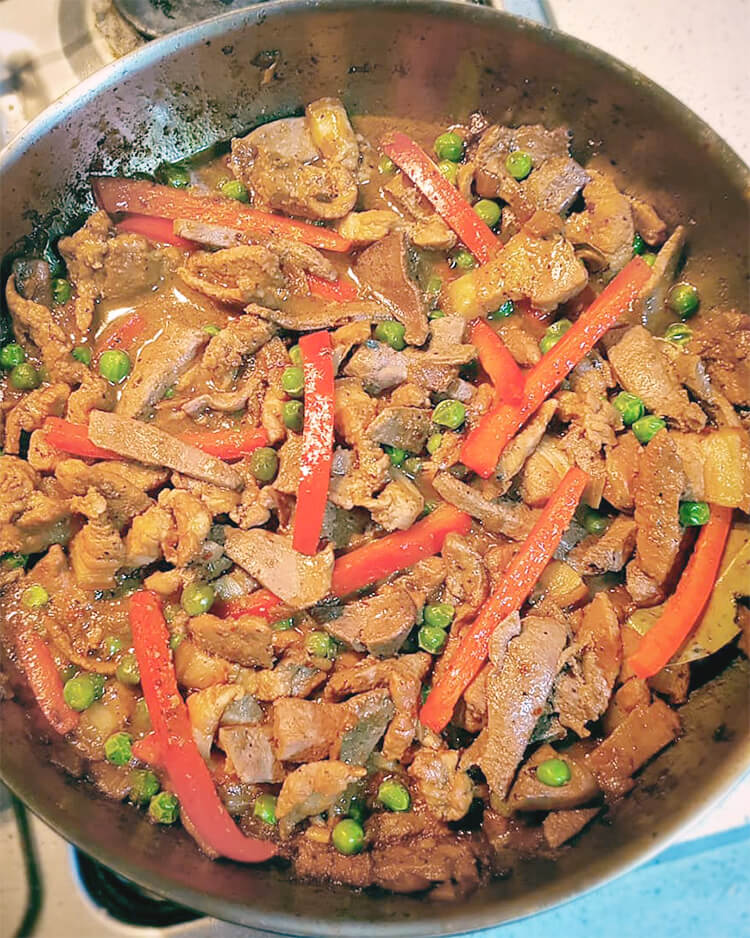
- Igado in a modern version, incorporating vegetables such as bell peppers, green peas, potatoes, and carrots.
- Alternative names: Hígado, Dinaldálem
- Course: Main course, Side dish
- Place of origin: Philippines
- Region or state: Ilocos Region
- Serving temperature: Warm
- Main ingredients: Pork tenderloin, pork offal (liver, lung, kidney, heart, intestines), soy sauce, vinegar
- Ingredients generally used: Garlic, onions, bay leaves, black pepper, vegetables (optional: bell peppers, green peas, potatoes, carrots)
- Similar dishes: Menudo, Pork Guisantes, Paklay

Igado also known as dinaldalem is a Filipino pork dish characterized by its savory and slightly tangy flavor and is typically prepared using pork tenderloin combined with pork offal, such as liver, lung, kidney, heart, and intestines. The meat and innards are cut into thin strips, sautéed with garlic and onions, and simmered in a mixture of soy sauce and vinegar, often seasoned with bay leaves and black pepper. The dish originated in the Ilocos Region of the Philippines and is commonly served as a main dish accompanied by steamed rice, where it is regarded as a staple of Ilocano cuisine.

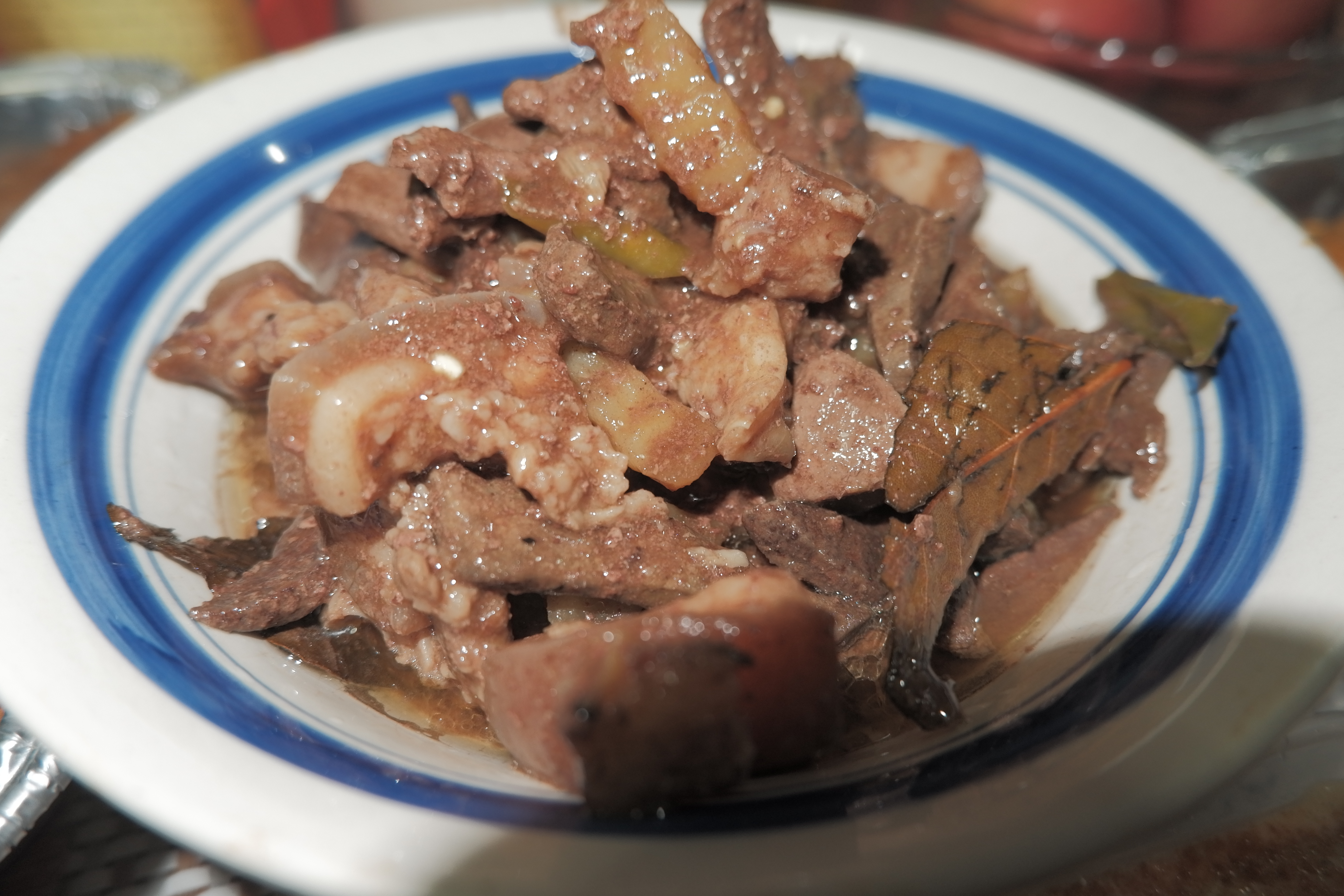
Igado prepared with pork, liver, potato, and bay leaf.

Variations of igado exist across households, with some versions incorporating vegetables such as bell peppers, green peas, potatoes, or carrots. The dish is often compared to the Filipino stew menudo; however, unlike menudo, igado typically uses soy sauce, fish sauce (patis), and vinegar rather than tomato sauce. Igado was reportedly a favorite dish of Elpidio Quirino, the sixth president of the Philippines, who was of Ilocano descent.

== Etymology ==
The name igado is believed to be derived from the Spanish word hígado, meaning “liver,” reflecting the dish’s prominent use of pork liver. This etymology points to the influence of Spanish language and cuisine on Filipino food traditions during the colonial period. The dish exemplifies the Ilocano tradition of utilizing all parts of the animal in cooking, combining flavor and resourcefulness.

Its alternate name, dinaldalem, is derived from the Ilocano word dálem, meaning “liver,” and refers to a closely related Ilocano dish prepared using similar ingredients and cooking methods.

== Variations ==
Variations of igado exist across households. Traditionally, the dish consists of pork tenderloin and pork offal—particularly liver, kidney, lung, intestines, and heart—marinated and seasoned with soy sauce and vinegar. Modern versions may incorporate vegetables such as bell peppers, green peas, potatoes, or carrots, and some adaptations include tomato sauce, which has led to the dish being mistakenly identified as menudo.

== See also ==
- Paklay
- Bopis
