= Hamonado =

Filipino Christmas dish

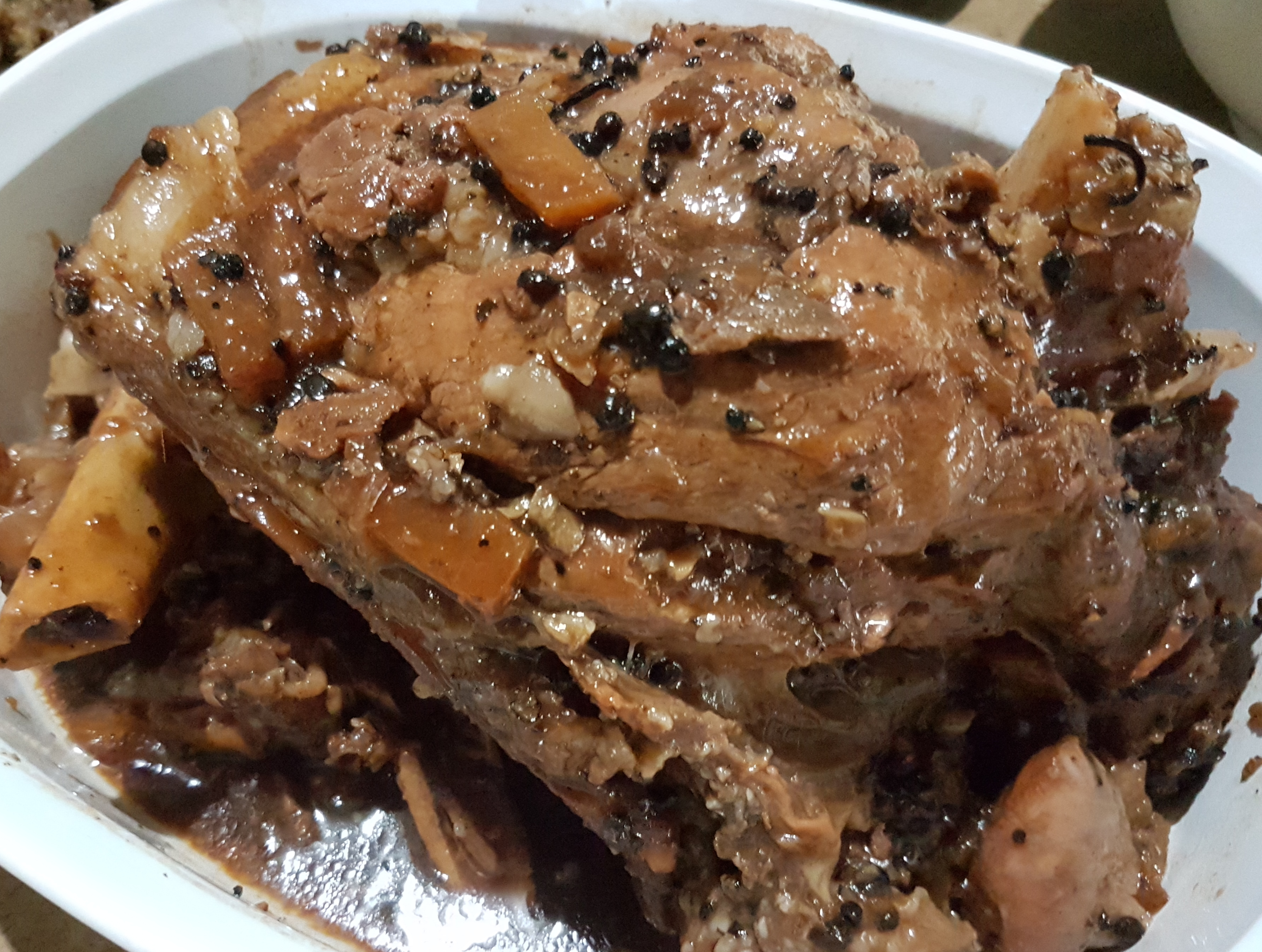
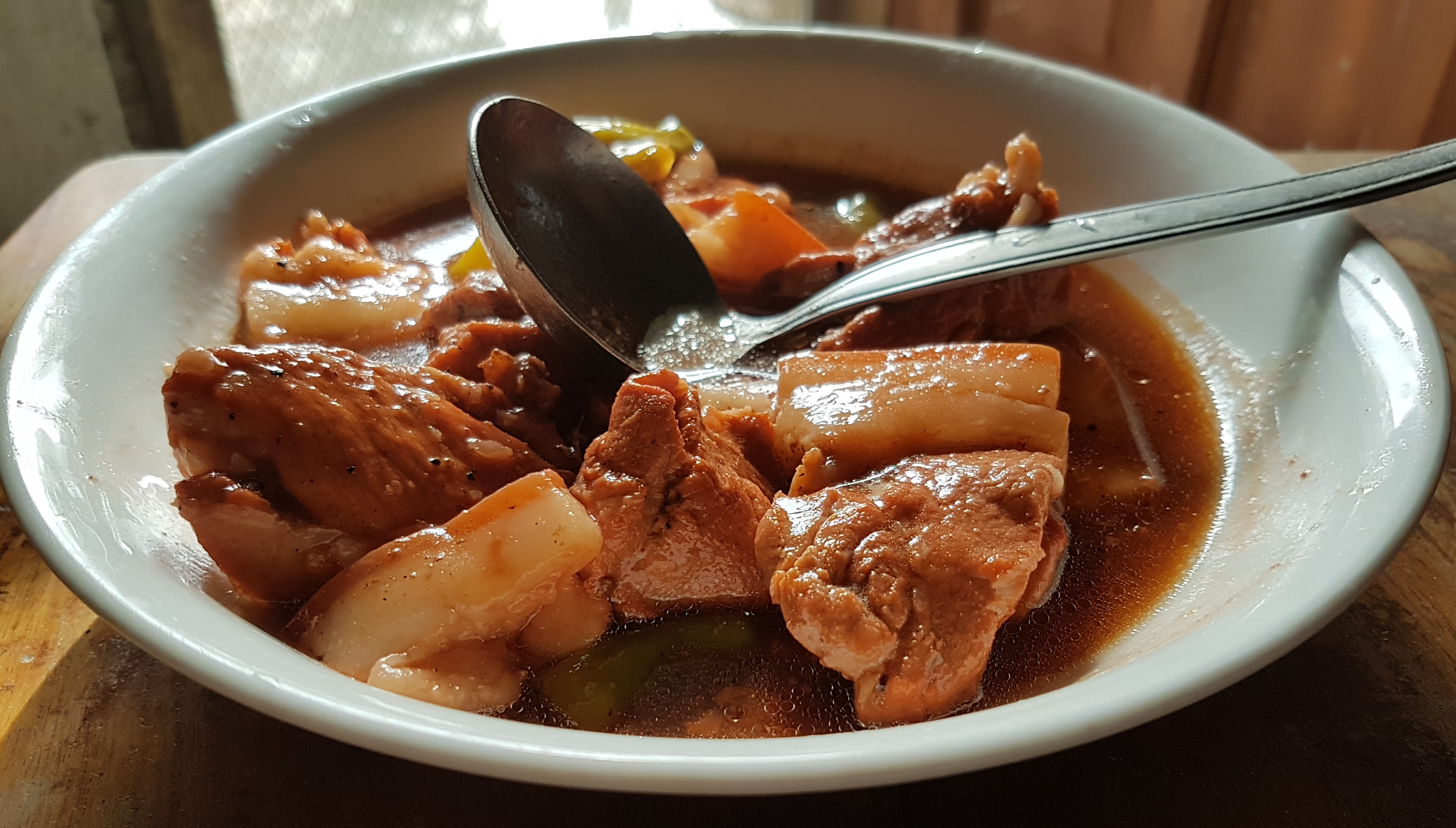
- Top: Pork hamonado; Bottom: Pork hamonado variant from Mindanao cooked afritada-style (with tomato sauce)
- Alternative names: jamónado, endulsado, endulzado
- Course: Main dish
- Place of origin: Philippines
- Serving temperature: Hot
- Main ingredients: Pineapple, brown sugar, soy sauce, pork/chicken/beef
- Similar dishes: Afritada, pininyahang manok

Hamonado (Spanish: jamonado), or hamonada, is a Filipino dish consisting of meat marinated and cooked in a sweet pineapple sauce. It is a popular dish during Christmas in Philippine regions where pineapples are commonly grown. Hamonado is also a general term for savory dishes marinated or cooked with pineapple in the Philippines.

== Etymology ==
The name hamonado is the Tagalog spelling of Spanish jamonado, meaning "[prepared] like hamon (ham)". However, hamonado should not be confused with hamon (jamón), which is also commonly cooked in the Philippines during the Christmas season. Hamonado is also known as endulsado (Spanish: endulzado, "sweetened" or "glazed") in Zamboanga.

Hamonado or hamonada is also a colloquial term for the sweet variant of the Filipino longganisa sausages (properly longganisang hamonado).

== Description ==
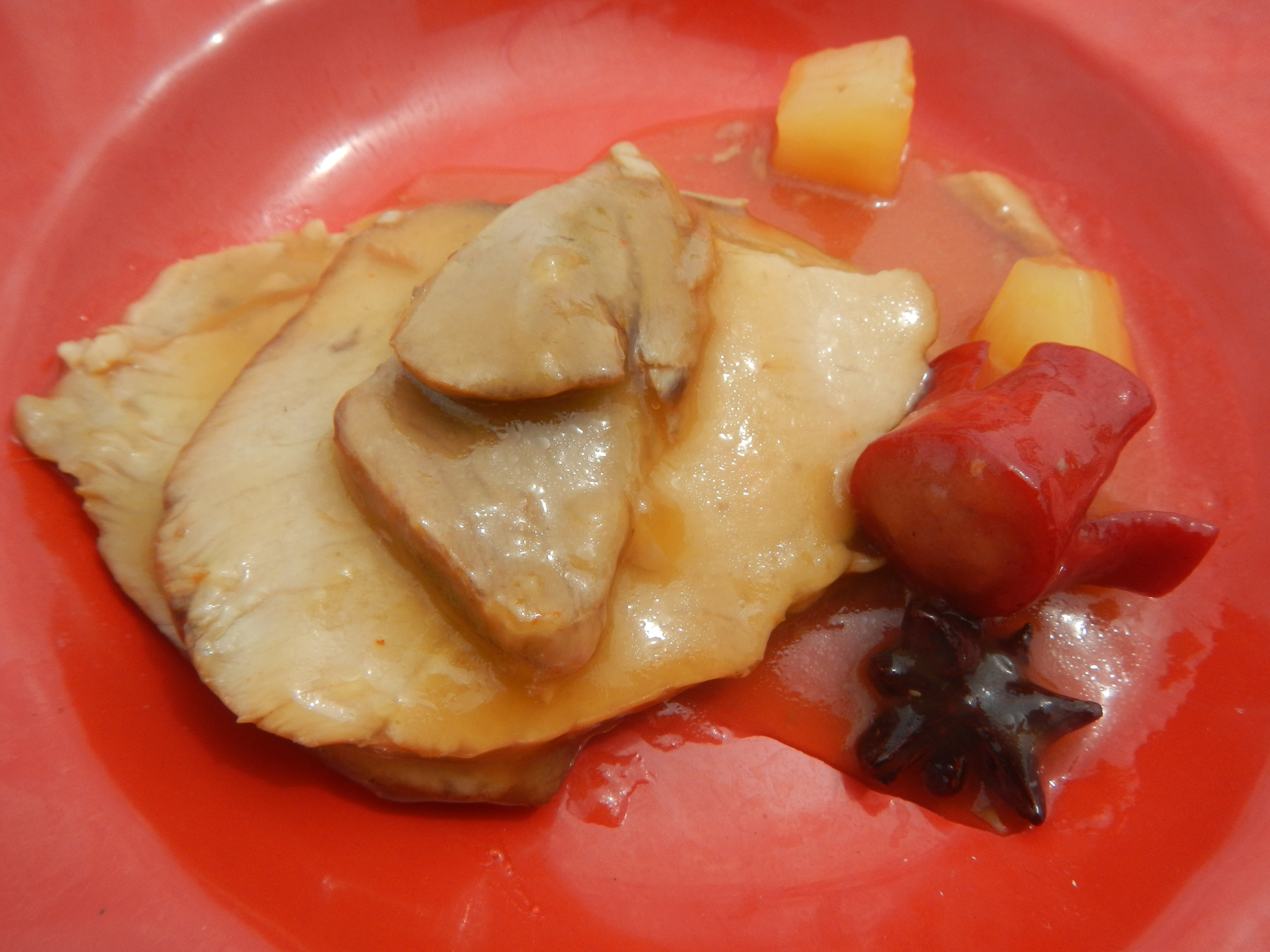
Pork hamonado from Bulacan with hotdogs and star anise

Typically meat (usually fatty cuts of pork, but can also be chicken or beef) is marinated overnight in a sweet sauce made with pineapple juice, brown sugar, soy sauce, and various spices. It is then pan-fried until the meat is browned. The meat is then simmered in stock with added pineapple chunks until the meat is very tender. It is served on white rice.

Variations of the dish sometimes does not include a marinating period, and instead slow cooks the pork until very tender, especially when using cuts with tough meat like pata (ham hock) or beef sirloin. Calamansi juice, carrots, raisins, pickles, longganisa, and hotdogs may also be added in some family recipes. Some hamonado variants may be cooked afritada-style, using tomato sauce or banana ketchup.

== Similar dishes ==
Hamonado is similar to pininyahang manok, braised chicken made with pineapples, except that the latter does not use soy sauce and is cooked in a milk base.

== See also ==
- Humba (dish)
- Tapa
- Tocino
