= Menudo (Filipino stew) =

Philippine stew

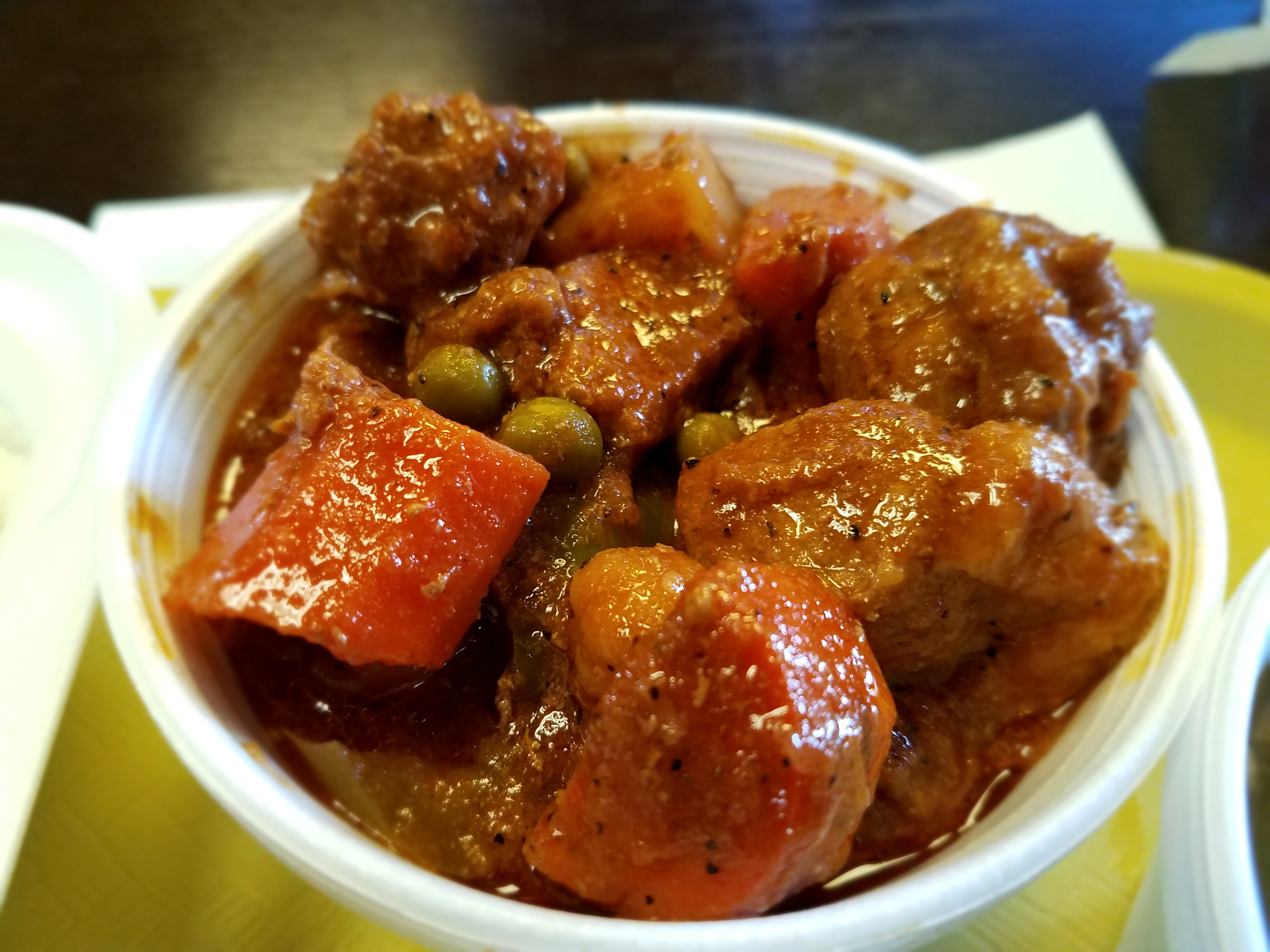
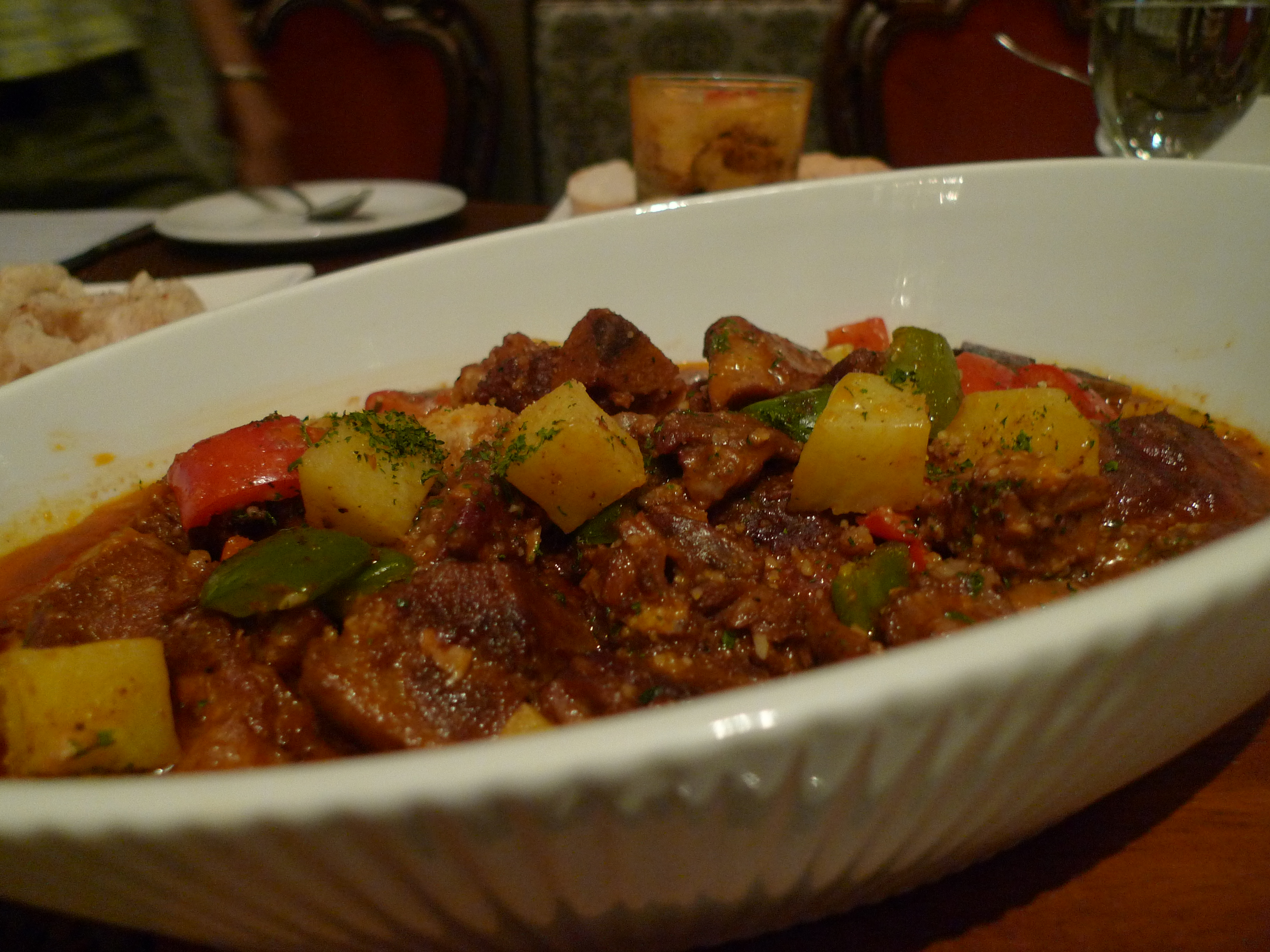
- Filipino Menudo
- Alternative names: ginamay (Cebuano)
- Place of origin: Philippines
- Region or state: Luzon, Visayas islands
- Serving temperature: Hot
- Main ingredients: pork, liver (pork or beef), carrots, potatoes, tomato sauce
- Variations: Addition of peas, raisins, hotdogs
- Similar dishes: afritada, kaldereta, igado, hardinera, guisantes

Menudo (from Spanish: "small [bits]"), also known as ginamay or ginagmay (Cebuano: "[chopped into] smaller pieces"), is a traditional stew from the Philippines made with pork and sliced liver in tomato sauce with carrots and potatoes. Unlike the Mexican dish of the same name, it does not use tripe, hominy, or red chili sauce.

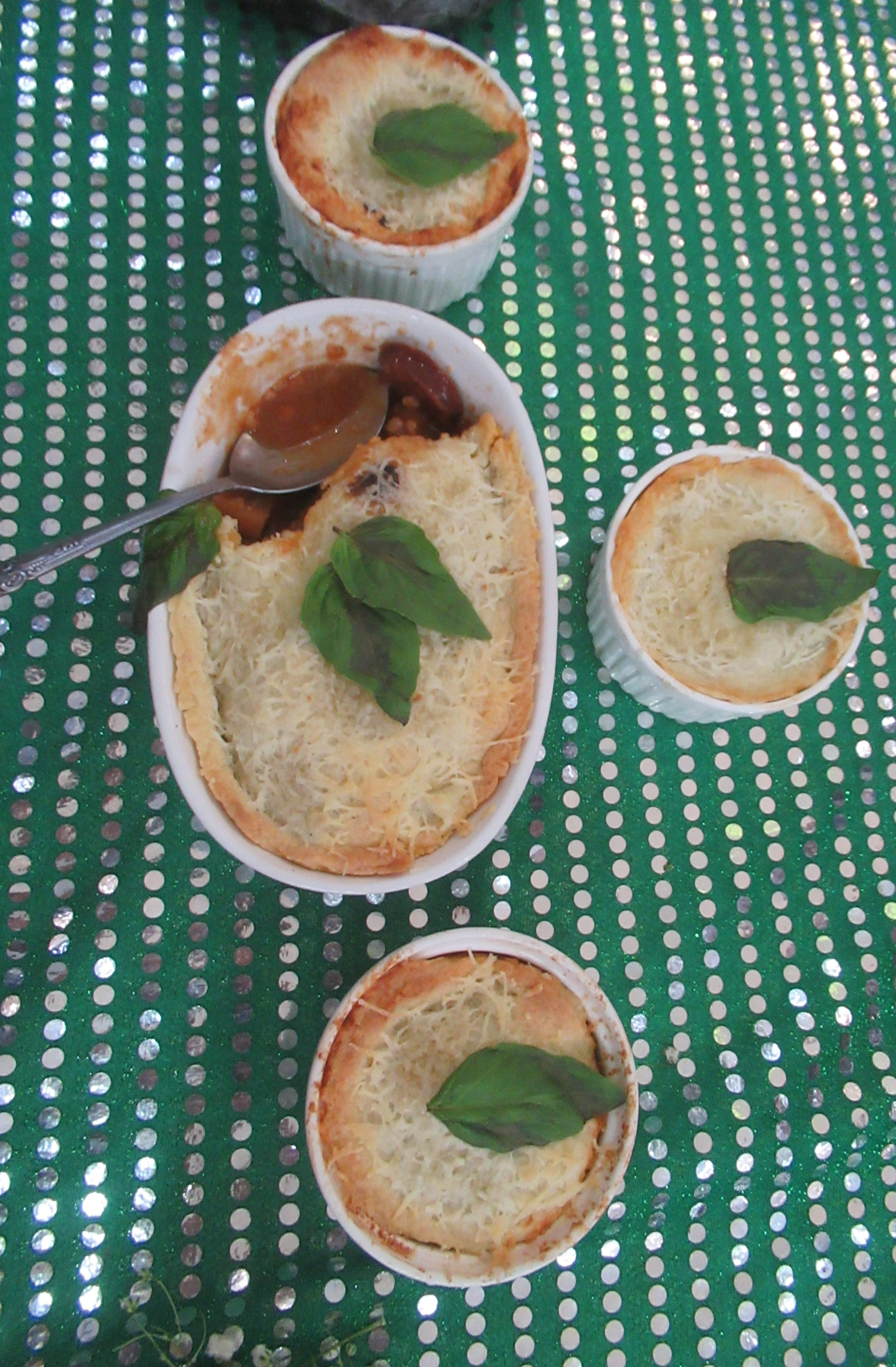
Menudo (Sasmuan)

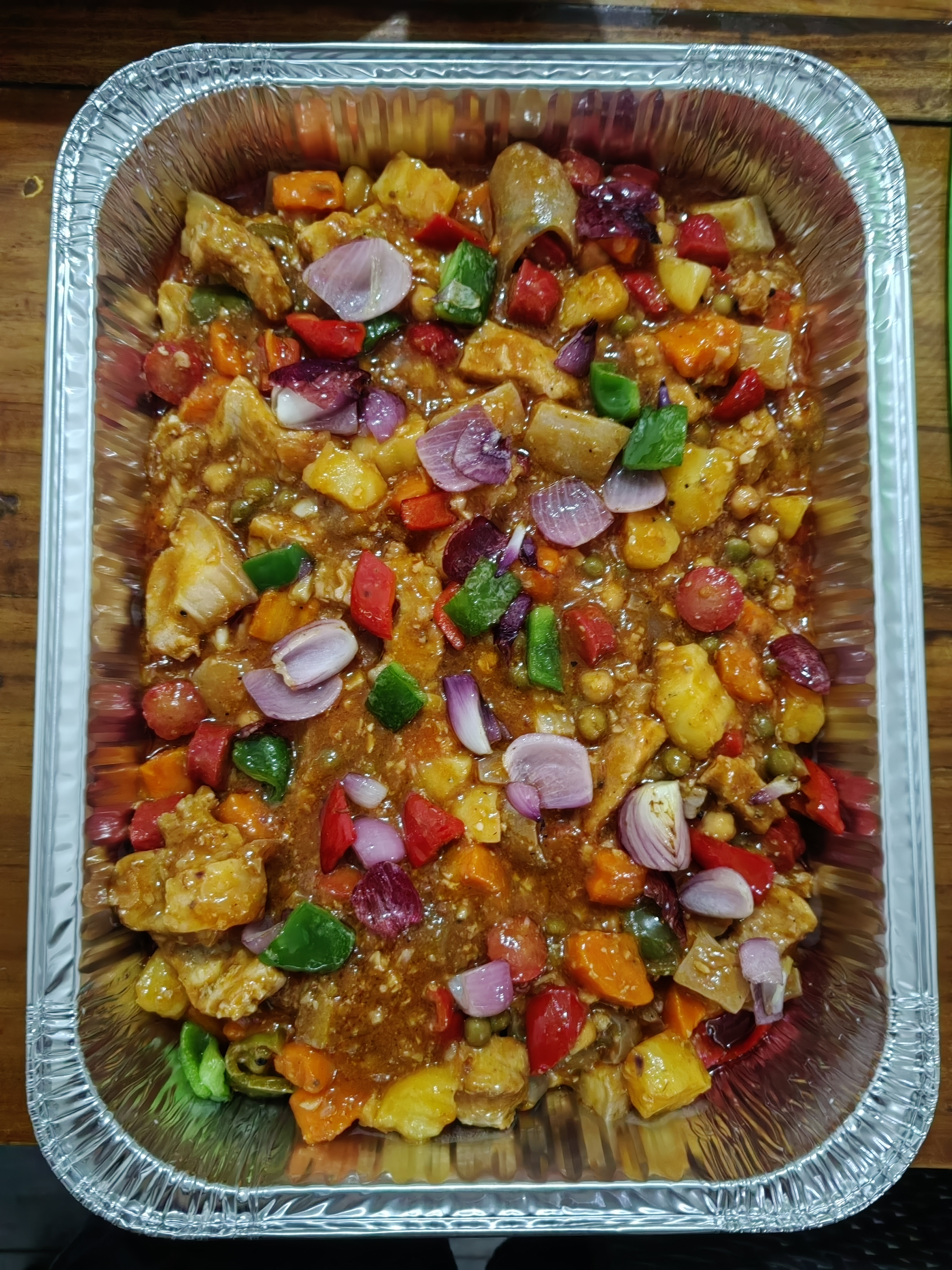
Menudo from Bicol Region

== Description ==
The dish is made with garlic, onions, tomatoes, pork, liver (pork or beef), diced potatoes, peas, raisins, diced carrots, green bell peppers, soy sauce, vinegar or calamansi, and tomato sauce, and seasoned with salt and pepper.

It is one of the most common offerings in carinderias or karinderyas (small eateries that offer budget-friendly meals to local residents) and is also commonly served in potlucks or buffets due to the inexpensive ingredients used in the dish.

== Waknatoy ==
Waknatoy
- Alternative names: Marikina menudo
- Course: Main dish
- Place of origin: Philippines
- Region or state: Marikina
- Serving temperature: Hot
- Variations: Menudo

Waknatoy, also called Marikina menudo, is a Filipino pork stew with pickles. It is a variant of the Filipino menudo stew originating from Marikina. It is made with cubed pork and pork liver with sausages (typically Chorizo de Bilbao), red and green bell peppers, tomatoes, garlic, onions, and distinctively, pickle relish, cooked in a tomato-based sauce with salt, pepper, fish sauce, and bay leaves. Waknatoy does not traditionally include other vegetables like potatoes and carrots, like menudo, but they can be included.

== See also ==
- Afritada
- Igado
- Everlasting
- Guisantes
- List of pork dishes
- List of stews
- Mechado
