= Mechado =

Filipino braised beef dish

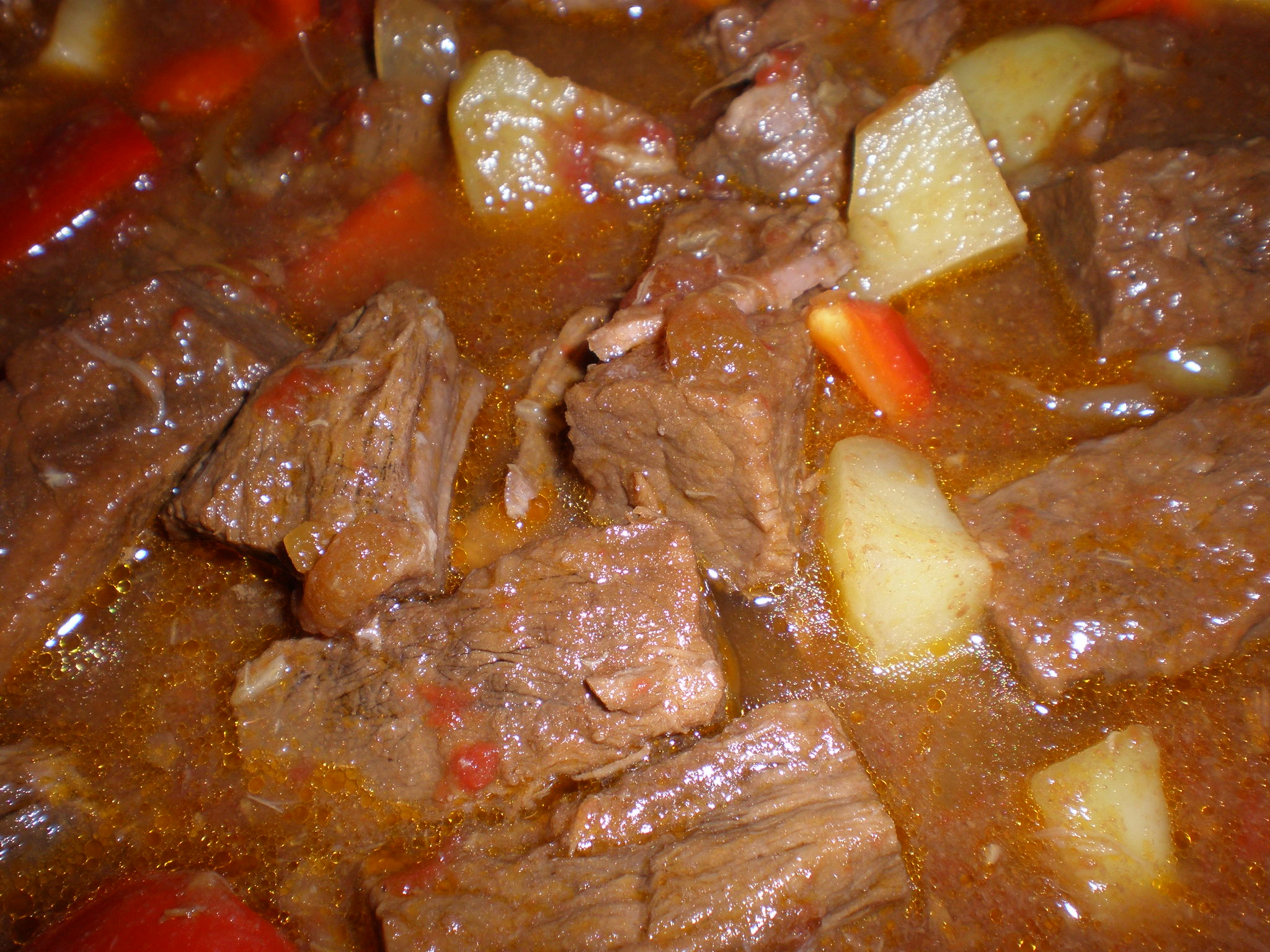
- Mechado (stew variant)
- Course: Main course
- Place of origin: Philippines
- Serving temperature: Hot
- Main ingredients: Beef, soy sauce, calamansi, black pepper, onions
- Variations: Beef tongue

Mechado is a Filipino beef roulade or stew dish braised in soy sauce and calamansi, with a tomato-based sauce. Traditionally, mechado was made by inserting strips of pork fatback (Spanish mecha, Filipino mitsa, "wick") into a cut of beef to lard it, giving the dish its name and tenderizing the meat. Today, the name often refers to a beef stew with much the same ingredients and preparation but without the larding process, i.e. the actual "mitsa" or wick of lard that originally gave the dish its name. Modern versions commonly include potatoes and carrots.

== History ==
The dish reflects Spanish colonial influence on Filipino cuisine. While larding was a traditional Spanish method to tenderize tougher cuts of beef, Filipino cooks adapted it using local ingredients like soy sauce, calamansi, and tomatoes.

== Etymology ==
The name "Mechado" comes from the Spanish word mecha or mechar, meaning "wick" or "to stuff," referencing the traditional larding method.

== Preparation ==
Mechado traditionally uses a cut of beef with pork fat strips inserted then sliced into chunks. The meat is marinated in soy sauce and calamansi or vinegar, then braised slowly in tomato sauce until tender. Potatoes and carrots are often added during cooking. The traditional mechado is shaped like a sliced roll akin to morcon, covered in the sauce. Modern adaptations as a stew may omit the larding step but retain the tomato-based sauce and the soy sauce and citrus-based marinade.

== See also ==
- Balbacua
- Kare-kare
- Kaldereta
- Philippine adobo
- List of beef dishes
- List of stews
