= Kaldereta =

Filipino meat stew

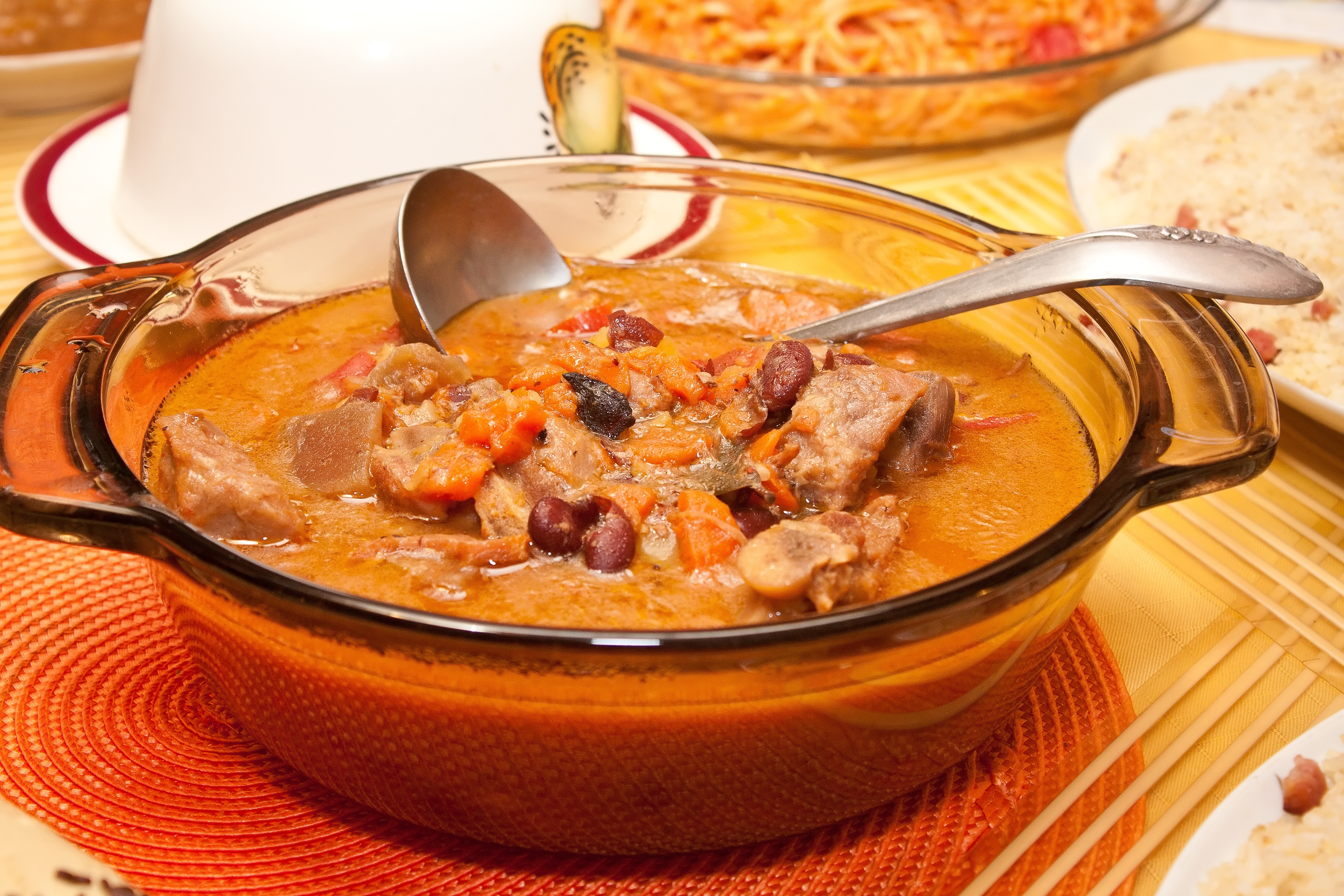
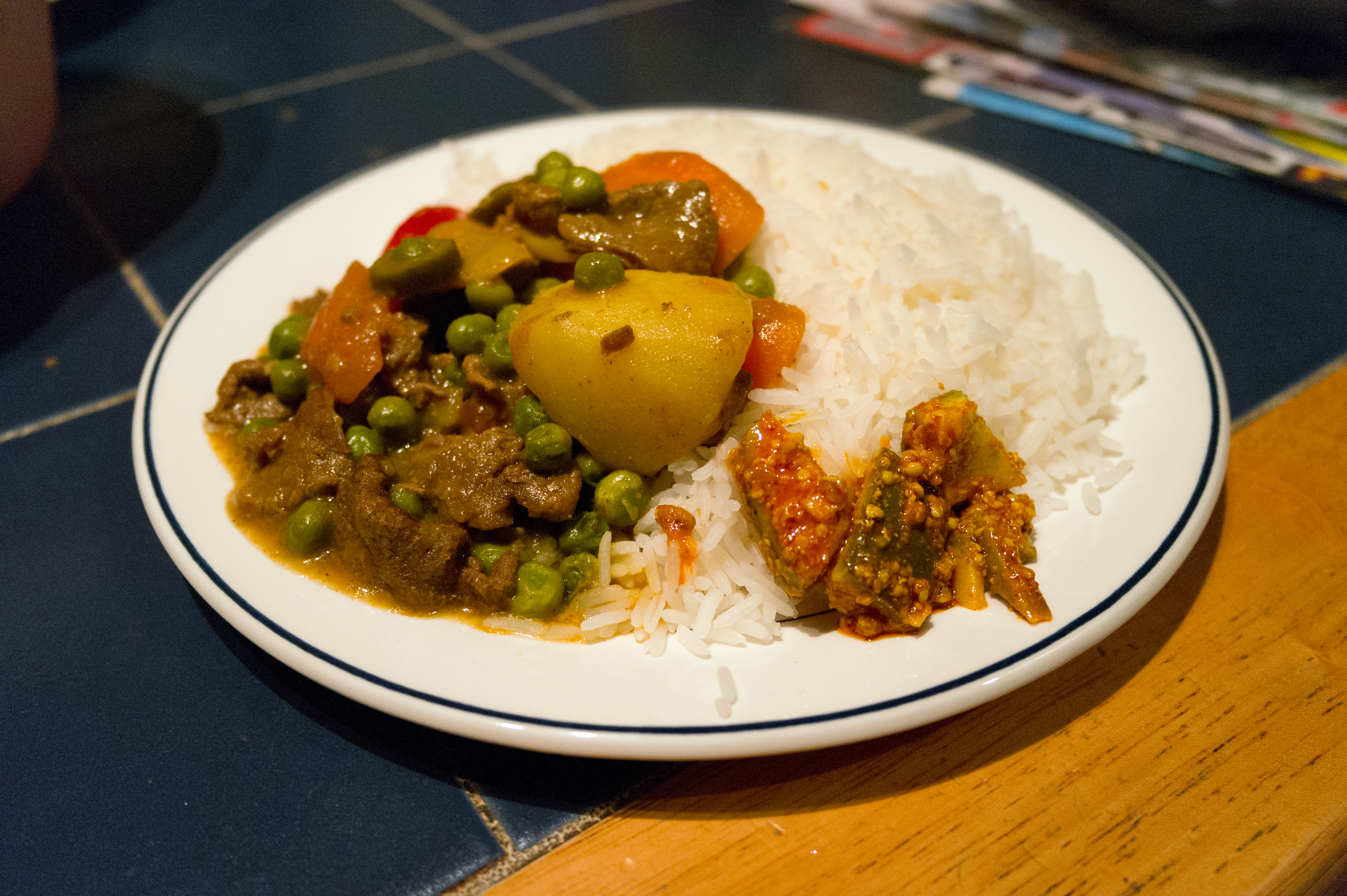
- Top: Goat kaldereta; Bottom: Beef kaldereta with rice
- Course: Main course
- Place of origin: Philippines
- Region or state: Popular in the Philippines, Luzon (Southern Tagalog)
- Serving temperature: Hot
- Main ingredients: Goat /mutton shoulders, corn oil, onion, garlic, carrots, bell pepper, potatoes, chili, flour, liver spread, tomato paste, butter, stock (beef or brown)
- Variations: Beef, pork, chicken
- Similar dishes: Afritada, menudo

Kaldereta or caldereta is a meat stew from the Philippines. Variations of the dish use beef, chicken, pork, or goat. The meat is usually stewed with vegetables and liver paste and spiced with red chillies. The vegetables may include tomatoes, potatoes, olives, bell peppers, and hot peppers. Kaldereta sometimes includes tomato sauce. It is an everyday dish in the Philippines that is also served during festivities and special occasions.

The name kaldereta or caldereta is derived from the Spanish caldera, the original Spanish dish the Filipino version comes directly from. The caldereta tradition in the Iberian Peninsula is prepared in two variations, fish and goat, so the Filipino version probably emerged from recreating the original recipe using local ingredients.

The dish also has similarities with two other Filipino dishes afritada and mechado, all of which use tomatoes, potatoes, carrots, and bell peppers as main ingredients.

== Gallery ==
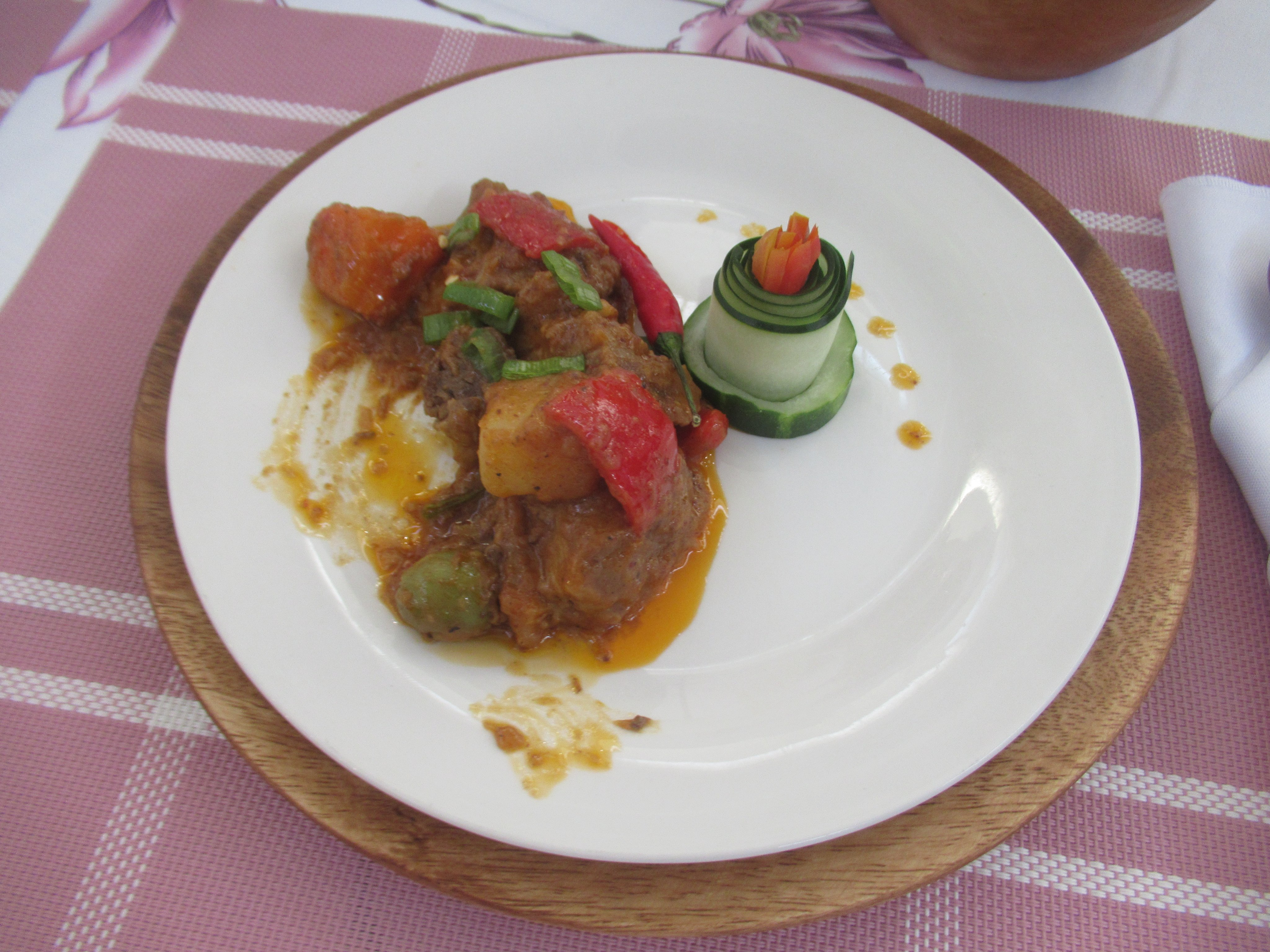
Beef kaldereta

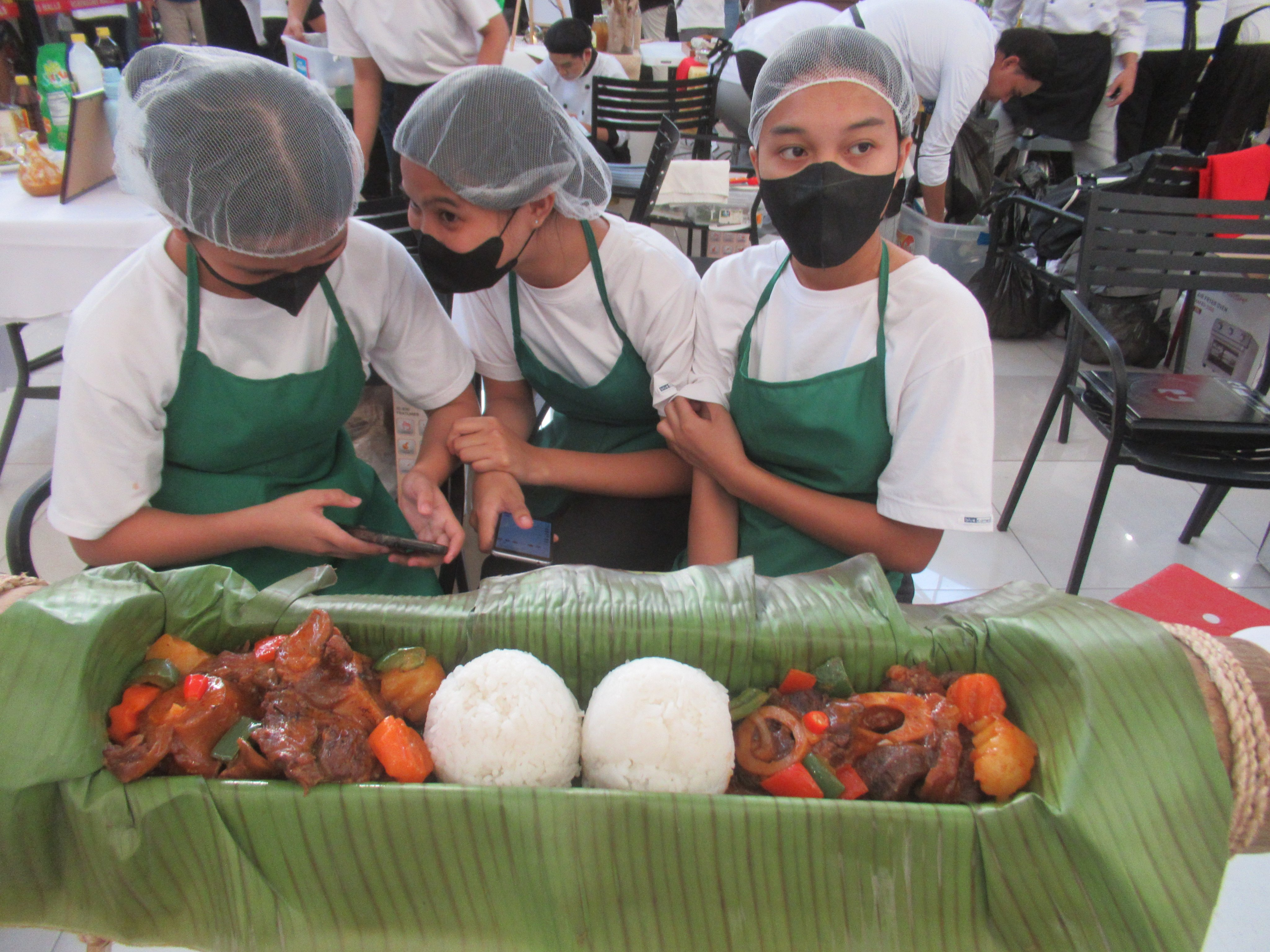
Kalderetang Bulalo

== See also ==
- Menudo (stew)
- Mechado
- Lengua estofado
- Gulai
- Rendang
- Scouse (food)
- List of goat dishes
- List of stews
