= A Bite of China =

Chinese documentary on history and traditions of Chinese cuisine

- Simplified Chinese: 舌尖上的中国
- Hanyu Pinyin: Shéjiān shàng de Zhōngguó
- Genre: Documentary
- Directed by: Chen Xiaoqing
- Narrated by: Li Lihong
- Composer: Roc Chen
- Country of origin: China
- Original language: Mandarin
- No. of seasons: 4
- No. of episodes: 29

Production
- Executive producer: Liu Wen
- Producers: Zhou Yan, Shi Yan, Shi Shilun
- Production location: China
- Editors: Zhang Ning, Liu Wen
- Running time: 50 minutes
- Production company: China Central Television

Original release
- Network: CCTV-1, CCTV-9
- Release: 14 May 2012 – present

A Bite of China (Chinese: 舌尖上的中国; pinyin: Shéjiān shàng de Zhōngguó; lit. 'China on the tongue tip') is a Chinese documentary television series on the history and traditions of food, dining, and cooking in China directed by Chen Xiaoqing (陈晓卿), narrated by Li Lihong (李立宏) with original music composed by Roc Chen (阿鲲). It first aired 14 May 2012 on China Central Television and quickly gained high ratings and widespread popularity. The seven-episode documentary series, which began filming in March 2011, introduces the history and story behind foods of various kinds in more than 60 locations in mainland China, Macau and Hong Kong. The documentary has also been actively encouraged as a means of introducing Chinese food culture to those unfamiliar with local cuisine. Various notable chefs such as Shen Hongfei and Chua Lam were consultants on the project.

A second season of A Bite of China, also consisting of seven episodes (plus trailer), aired from 18 April to 6 June 2014. The third season was aired from 19 to 26 February 2018, during the Chinese New Year holiday.

The series established a new sales model by linking the documentary contents to domestic e-commerce platforms.

== Foods Featured ==
=== Season 1 ===
Episode	Title	Dish (Chinese)	Dish (English)	Location
1	The Gift from Nature	烤松茸	Grilled Matsutake	Xamgyi'nyilha County, Yunnan
1	The Gift from Nature	油焖冬笋	Stewed bamboo shoots	Suichang County, Zhejiang
1	The Gift from Nature	黄豆酸笋小黄鱼	Deep-fried little yellow croakers fried with soybean and pickled bamboo shoots	Liuzhou, Guangxi
1	The Gift from Nature	螺蛳粉	Rice noodle in snail soup (Luosifen)	Guangxi
1	The Gift from Nature	腌笃鲜	Yan Du Xian	Suichang County, Zhejiang
1	The Gift from Nature	莴笋炒火腿	Nuodeng ham with Celtuce	Dali, Yunnan
1	The Gift from Nature	火腿炒饭	Nuodeng ham fried rice	Dali, Yunnan
1	The Gift from Nature	炸藕夹	Deep-fried lotus root sandwich	Jiayu County, Hubei
1	The Gift from Nature	莲藕炖排骨	Stewed spareribs with lotus root	Jiayu County, Hubei
1	The Gift from Nature	酸辣藕丁	Hot and sour diced lotus root	Jiayu County, Hubei
1	The Gift from Nature	鱼头泡饼	Fish head soup with Chinese style flatbread	Chagan Lake, Jilin
1	The Gift from Nature	垮炖杂鱼	Stewed mixed fish in thick soy sauce of Northeast Chinese style	Chagan Lake, Jilin
1	The Gift from Nature	水煮红螺		Sanya, Hainan
1	The Gift from Nature	香煎马鲛鱼	Fried scomberomorus	Sanya, Hainan
1	The Gift from Nature	蒜烧池子鱼		Sanya, Hainan
1	The Gift from Nature	酸菜炮弹鱼	Boiled bullet mackerel with pickled cabbage	Sanya, Hainan
2	The Story of Staple Food	花馍		Dingcun, Xiangfen, Shanxi
2	The Story of Staple Food	黄馍馍	Steamed broom corn millet bun	Suide County, Shaanxi
2	The Story of Staple Food	馕	Naan	Kuche, Xinjiang
2	The Story of Staple Food	黎平汤粉	Liping Rice Noodle Soup	Liping, Guizhou
2	The Story of Staple Food	干炒牛河	Beef chow fun	Guangzhou
2	The Story of Staple Food	肉夹馍	Roujiamo	Xi'an
2	The Story of Staple Food	泡馍	Paomo	Xi'an
2	The Story of Staple Food	兰州牛肉面	Lanzhou beef lamian	Lanzhou
2	The Story of Staple Food	竹升面	Jook-sing noodles	Guangzhou
2	The Story of Staple Food	长寿面	Longevity Noodles	Dingcun, Xiangfen, Shanxi
2	The Story of Staple Food	岐山臊子面	Qishan noodles with minced pork	Qishan, Shaanxi
2	The Story of Staple Food	嘉兴肉粽子	Jiaxing meat sticky rice dumpling (meat Zongzi)	Jiaxing, Zhejiang
2	The Story of Staple Food	宁波年糕	Ningbo rice cake (Ningbo Niangao)	Ningbo, Zhejiang
2	The Story of Staple Food	梭子蟹炒年糕	Niangao (rice cake) stir-fried with crabs	Ningbo, Zhejiang
2	The Story of Staple Food	焖面	Braised noodles	Beijing
2	The Story of Staple Food	饺子	Jiaozi	Beijing
3	Inspiration for Transformation	豆腐	Tofu	Jianshui, Yunnan/Shiping, Yunnan/Shou County, Anhui
3	Inspiration for Transformation	奶豆腐/奶茶	Quark and milk tea	Xilingol League, Inner Mongolia
3	Inspiration for Transformation	黄酒/酱油	Shaoxing wine and soy sauce	Shaoxing
4	The Flavour of Time	泡菜	Pao cai	Yanbian Prefecture, Jilin
4	The Flavour of Time	腊肠 （和興腊味）	Chinese sausage (Wo Hing Preserved Meats)	Hong Kong
4	The Flavour of Time	腌鱼, 腊肉	Cured Fish, Preserved Pork	Xiangxi Prefecture, Hunan
4	The Flavour of Time	金华火腿	Jinhua ham	Jinhua, Zhejiang
4	The Flavour of Time	虾酱	Shrimp paste	Hong Kong
5	The Secret of Kitchen	汽锅鸡	Qiguo ji (Yunnan steamed chicken soup)	Kunming
5	The Secret of Kitchen	包子	Baozi	Yangzhou
5	The Secret of Kitchen	葱烧海参	Braised sea cucumber	Shandong
5	The Secret of Kitchen	西湖醋鱼	West Lake fish in vinegar gravy	Hangzhou
6	The Equillibrium of Tastes	糖葱薄饼	Spring onion flatbread	Shantou
6	The Equillibrium of Tastes	熏鸭	Smoked duck	Xiashan
6	The Equillibrium of Tastes	酱排骨	Cured spare ribs	Wuxi
6	The Equillibrium of Tastes	陈皮鸭	Chenpi duck	Macau
6	The Equillibrium of Tastes	盐焗鸡	Baked chicken in salt	Guangdong
6	The Equillibrium of Tastes	糖醋排骨	Sweet and sour pork ribs	Zhenjiang
6	The Equillibrium of Tastes	鱼香肉丝	Yuxiangrousi (Yuxiang shredded pork, Pork with garlic sauce)	Sichuan
6	The Equillibrium of Tastes	豆瓣酱	Doubanjiang	Sichuan
6	The Equillibrium of Tastes	麻婆豆腐	Mapo doufu	Sichuan
6	The Equillibrium of Tastes	藤椒鱼	Green Pepper Rattan fish	Sichuan
6	The Equillibrium of Tastes	麻辣火锅	Spicy hot pot	Chongqing
6	The Equillibrium of Tastes	紫菜蛋汤	Seaweed egg drop soup	Shantou
6	The Equillibrium of Tastes	鱼丸紫菜煲	Seaweed fish ball pot	Shantou
6	The Equillibrium of Tastes	清蒸鱼	Steamed fish	Guangzhou
6	The Equillibrium of Tastes	白切鸡	Steamed chicken	Guangzhou
7	Our Fields	酸汤鱼	Fish in sour soup	
7	Our Fields	赛螃蟹	Saipangxie (Tasty-as-crab)	Zhangzidao, Liaoning
7	Our Fields	蟹黄汤包	Crab-roe tang bao	Jingjiang, Jiangsu
7	Our Fields	蟹黄汪豆腐	Tofu with crab yolk	Xinghua, Jiangsu
7	Our Fields	芋头红烧肉	Red braised pork belly with taro	Xinghua, Jiangsu
7	Our Fields	青稞酒	Chhaang	Tibet
7	Our Fields	油炸倭瓜花	Fried pumpkin flowers	Beijing
7	Our Fields	角瓜饺子	Zucchini Jiaozi	Beijing

=== Season 2 ===
Some of these English translations are based on China Daily so may not be accurate.

Episode	Title	Dish (Chinese)	Dish (English)	Location
1	Footsteps	麻辣香肠	Spicy sausage	
1	Footsteps	蜜汁鳗鱼	Honey-glazed eel	
1	Footsteps	清炖跳跳鱼	Stewed mudskippers	
1	Footsteps	山东煎饼	Shandong-style jianbing	Shandong
1	Footsteps	潮州春卷	Chaozhou spring rolls	Chaozhou, Guangdong
1	Footsteps	雷山鱼酱	Leishan fish sauce	Leishan County, Guizhou
1	Footsteps	酥油蜂蜜	Honey shortening	
1	Footsteps	蓝田裤带面	Lantian Biangbiang noodles	Lantian County, Shaanxi
1	Footsteps	煎饼卷大葱	Scallions in Shandong-style jianbing	
1	Footsteps	泉州萝卜饭	Quanzhou radish rice roll	Quanzhou, Fujian
2	Heritage	菜籽油	Rapeseed Oil	She County, Anhui
2	Heritage	挂面	Hung-dried Noodles	Shaanxi
2	Heritage	糯米卷	Sticky Rice Rolls	Suzhou
2	Heritage	苏式小方糕	Suzhou-style Little Diamond Cakes	Suzhou
2	Heritage	蕨根糍粑	Fern Root Cake	Chenzhou
2	Heritage	蚝烙	Or Luak (Oyster Omelette with Tapioca Starch)	Shantou
2	Heritage	烫干丝	Dried tofu threads in consommé	Yangzhou
2	Heritage	扣三丝	Chicken, Mushroom, Ham Threads in Consommé	Shanghai
2	Heritage	油爆河虾	Flash Fried River Shrimp	Shanghai
2	Heritage	黄鳝啫啫煲	Swamp eel clay pot	Guangzhou
2	Heritage	三套鸭	Santaoya (Farm-raised duck stuffed with wild duck and squab)	
2	Heritage	脱骨鱼	Bone-free fish	
2	Heritage	船点	Boat pastry	Suzhou
2	Heritage	枣泥拉糕	Jujube paste cake	Suzhou
2	Heritage	苏州头汤面	Suzhou noodles cooked in first-time soup	Suzhou
2	Heritage	重庆小面	Chongqing small noodles	Chongqing
2	Heritage	凉拌猪耳	Pig ears dressed with sause	
2	Heritage	蒜泥白肉	Thin-sliced pork belly with minced garlic sauce	
2	Heritage	红油	Chili oil	
2	Heritage	油炸锅巴	Fried Scorched rice	
2	Heritage	回锅肉	Twice cooked pork	
3	Seasons	雷笋炒肉丝	Fried shredded pork with early spring bamboo shoots	
3	Seasons	笋干炖鸡	Stewed chicken with dried bamboo shoots	
3	Seasons	铁锅炖鱼	Fish and tofu stewed in iron pot	
3	Seasons	咸肉蒸黄泥拱竹笋	Steamed bacon with Huang-ni-gong bamboo shoots	
3	Seasons	榆钱饭	Steamed elm seeds with cornmeal	
3	Seasons	紫苏炒青蛳	Purple perilla fried with water snails	
3	Seasons	玛仁糖/切糕	Xinjiang cut cake	Xinjiang
3	Seasons	抓饭	Xinjiang polu	Xinjiang
3	Seasons	虾子小刀面	Noodles with shrimp roe	
3	Seasons	桂花糯米藕	Steamed lotus root stuffed with sticky rice and sweet olive flower	
3	Seasons	板栗烧鸡	Braised chicken with chestnuts	
3	Seasons	老鸭雁来蕈	Old duck stewed with lactarius deliciosus	
4	Home Cooking	小凹馍	Steamed concave buns made of maize flour and Chinese chives	
4	Home Cooking	莜面凉皮	Naked oat glass noodle	
4	Home Cooking	天门蒸菜	Tian-men steamed dishes	
4	Home Cooking	红烧肉	Red braised pork belly	
4	Home Cooking	泡菜鱼	Stewed fish in paocai	
4	Home Cooking	泡菜	Paocai	
4	Home Cooking	西瓜酱	Watermelon jam	
4	Home Cooking	虾子焖茭白	Shrimp roe stewed with manchurian wild rice	
4	Home Cooking	蒲菜涨蛋	Cattail omelette	
4	Home Cooking	蒲菜水饺	Cattail dumplings	
4	Home Cooking	奶汤蒲菜	Stewed cattail in milky soup	
4	Home Cooking	蒲笋干烧肉	Braised pork with cattail	
4	Home Cooking	陈皮红豆沙	Orange flavored red bean paste	
4	Home Cooking	红豆姜撞奶	Ginger milk with red bean	
4	Home Cooking	莲子龟苓膏	Lotus seed Guilinggao (tortoise jelly)	
4	Home Cooking	木瓜雪耳羹	Dessert soup with snow ear and papaya	
4	Home Cooking	鹌鹑蛋白果糖水	Tong sui (dessert soup) with quail eggs and ginkgo fruit	
4	Home Cooking	黄糖糍粑	Glutinous rice cake with brown sugar	
4	Home Cooking	猪脚姜	Stewed pig's feet with ginger	
4	Home Cooking	冬瓜荷叶煲老鸭	Boiled old duck with winter melon and lotus leaf	
5	Encounters	小鸡炖蘑菇	Stewed chick with mushroom	Jilin
5	Encounters	烩南北	Stewed mushrooms with winter bamboo shoots	
5	Encounters	重庆火锅	Chongqing hot pot	Chongqing
5	Encounters	北京涮肉火锅	Beijing hot pot (Shuan yangrou)	Beijing
5	Encounters	云南菌子火锅	Yunnan mushroom hot pot	Yunnan
5	Encounters	潮汕牛肉火锅	Chaoshan Beef hot pot	Chaoshan
5	Encounters	鸡蛋仔	Egg puff	Hong Kong
5	Encounters	粉圆	Tapioca Pearls	Hong Kong
5	Encounters	烤香肠	Toasted sausage	
5	Encounters	葡式焗扇贝	Portuguese-style baked scallops	Macau
5	Encounters	豆腐蒸桂花鱼	Steamed mandarin fish with tofu	
5	Encounters	金汤水煮鳜鱼	Stewed mandarin fish in pumpkin soup	
5	Encounters	水煮海鲜	Poached seafood	
5	Encounters	盆菜	Poon choi / basin meal	
5	Encounters	西湖醋鱼	West Lake fish in vinegar gravy	
5	Encounters	鲤鱼焙面	Baked noodles with sweet-and-sour carp	
5	Encounters	开封灌汤包	Kaifeng soup dumplings	Kaifeng
5	Encounters	杭州小笼包	Hangzhou soup dumplings	Hangzhou
5	Encounters	片儿川	Noodles with pork, bamboo shoot and Chinese mustard green (Pian'erchuan)	Kaifeng, Henan
5	Encounters	罗宋汤	Borscht	Shanghai
5	Encounters	炸猪排	Deep fried pork cutlet	Shanghai
5	Encounters	牛肉球	Steamed beef ball	
5	Encounters	纳仁	Stewed mutton with noodles (Naren)	
5	Encounters	大盘鸡	Saute spicy chicken with potatoes and noodles (Dapanji)	Xinjiang
5	Encounters	架子肉	Meat roasted on skewer	
5	Encounters	烤包子	Roasted samsas	
5	Encounters	拉条子	Lagman noodle	Xinjiang
5	Encounters	上海桂花糕	Shanghai osmanthus cake	
5	Encounters	红烧牛肉面	Noodles with red braised beef	
5	Encounters	壳菜肉/淡菜	Dried mussel meat	
6	Secret Realms	酸辣华子鱼	Hot and sour Amur ide	
6	Secret Realms	沙蟹汁	Ghost crab extract	
6	Secret Realms	韭花酱	Chive flower sauce	
6	Secret Realms	羊肚包肉	Roasted mutton wrapped in lamb tripe	
6	Secret Realms	红柳枝烤羊肉	Mutton cubes kawap on rose willow branch	
6	Secret Realms	手抓羊肉	Boiled mutton / Mutton eaten with hands	
6	Secret Realms	馕	Xinjiang naan	Xinjiang
6	Secret Realms	清蒸石斑鱼	Steamed grouper	
6	Secret Realms	清蒸鱼干	Steamed dried fish	
6	Secret Realms	清蒸虾干	Steamed dried shrimps	
6	Secret Realms	炒鸡枞	Fried termite mushroom	
7	Three Meals	煎饼果子	Tianjin-style jianbing (jianbing with youtiao)	Tianjin
7	Three Meals	面窝	Mianwo (Wuhan-style fried doughnut)	Wuhan
7	Three Meals	三鲜豆皮	Seafood tofu skin	
7	Three Meals	热干面	Hot dry noodles	Wuhan
7	Three Meals	艇仔粥	Tingzai porridge	Guangzhou
7	Three Meals	肠粉	Rice noodle roll	Guangzhou
7	Three Meals	干蒸烧卖	Siu mai (Steamed pork dumplings)	Guangzhou
7	Three Meals	榴莲酥	Crispy durian cake	Guangzhou
7	Three Meals	虾饺	Har gow (Steamed shrimp dumpling)	Guangzhou
7	Three Meals	咸鸭蛋	Salted duck egg	
7	Three Meals	剁椒蒸鱼头	Steamed fish head with pickled peppers	
7	Three Meals	蒿子粑粑	Crown daisy rice cake	
7	Three Meals	干子烧肉	Braised pork with dried tofu	
7	Three Meals	时蔬彩虹蛋糕	Seasonal vegetables rainbow cake	
7	Three Meals	冰皮月饼	Snow skin mooncake	Hong Kong
7	Three Meals	生煎包	Shengjian mantou (Fried bun stuffed with pork)	
7	Three Meals	锅盔	Guokui	
7	Three Meals	豌杂面	Noodles with peas and meat sauce	Sichuan
7	Three Meals	麻辣鸡	Chicken cured with chili and flower pepper	
7	Three Meals	酸木瓜煮鱼	Stewed fish with pickled papaya	
7	Three Meals	爆炒见手青	Stir-fried Jian-Shou-Qing mushrooms	

== Reception ==
A Bite of China attracted high ratings during its nightly airing on CCTV-1, drawing an estimated 100 million viewers. It also has an overall approval rating of 91% on Douban. Oliver Thring of The Guardian praised it as "the best TV show I've ever seen about food. I'd hazard it's the best one ever made."

== Controversy ==
In the Episode 2 of the Season 3, the voice-over indicates that Huifang as a community in Xi'an dates back to Tang dynasty. The remark was refuted by a history scholar, Yu Gengzhe. Yu commented on Weibo that where present-day Huifang located, was the Central Secretariat of Tang, along with the barracks of the imperial guards. And a mosque supposedly was sited there in the Song dynasty. Some of the portrayal of certain areas within the series have also been criticized.

The background Chinese painting appeared in the documentary's poster is "Ridge cloud with rain" (岭云带雨) by Xu Qinsong (许钦松). At first, the poster designer used the painting without permission of Mr. Xu, However, this copyright issue was later solved by reconciliation between the artist and the documentary producer.

== International Broadcast ==
- Malaysia-8TV (Malaysia)
