= Collapse of Juxian Restaurant =

2020 building collapse in Shanxi, China

- Date: 29 August 2020; 6 years ago
- Time: 9:40 (CST, UTC+8)
- Location: Chenzhuang Village, Taosi Township of Xiangfen County, Shanxi; 35°54′08″N 111°32′16″E
- Deaths: 29
- Injuries: 28
- Survivors: 57

Juxian Restaurant (Chinese: 聚仙饭店; pinyin: Jùxiān Fàndiàn), a restaurant located in Taosi Township of Xiangfen County, Shanxi, China, collapsed at around 9:40 a.m. on August 29, 2020. Twenty-nine people have been confirmed dead.

== Background ==
On the morning of August 29, 2020, a birthday banquet of an 80-year-old person was held at Juxian Restaurant, in Taosi Township of Xiangfen County, north China's Shanxi province. Relatives and fellow villagers attended the birthday banquet.

== Collapse ==
At around 9:40 a.m. on August 29, 2020, the roof of the main hall of Juxian Restaurant suddenly collapsed. A witness said that guests had already arrived but the birthday banquet had not started.

== Rescue ==
After the collapse, the Government of Xiangfen County established a rescue headquarters. Party chief Liu Hao (刘浩) and Magistrate Bai Jiancheng (白建成) served as commanders, and sent 840 rescuers with over 20 large machines, sniffer dogs, and life detectors to rescue the victims. The local government also sent more than 100 medical workers with 15 ambulances to the site.

At 1:30 a.m. on August 30, 48 people were recovered, of which 20 were deceased, 21 were slightly injured, and seven were seriously injured. At about 8:00 a.m., a total of 57 people were recovered, including 29 people dead. Seven were seriously injured and 21 sustained minor injuries.

== Investigation ==
On August 29, 2020, the Work Safety Committee of State Council was set to supervise the investigation into the restaurant collapse, and was ordered to screen safety risks of illegal buildings.

The Government of Shanxi set up a special team to investigate and bring those responsible to justice, and ordered a safety inspection over buildings and public gathering places across the province starting August 30.

== See also ==
- Collapse of Xinjia Express Hotel
