= Shiping Zhu =

Canadian engineer

- 朱世平
- Born: October 22, 1959 (age 66); Suichang, Zhejiang, China

Academic background
- Education: B.Eng. Zhejiang University; Ph.D McMaster University
- Thesis: Advances in free radical polymerization kinetics (1991)
- Doctoral advisor: Hamielec, A.E.

Shiping Zhu (simplified Chinese: 朱世平; traditional Chinese: 朱世平; pinyin: Zhū Shìpíng; born 1959) is a Chinese-born Canadian chemical engineer and academic administrator. He has served as Vice President for External and Student Affairs at The Chinese University of Hong Kong, Shenzhen (CUHK-Shenzhen) since 2017.

Previously, he was a Canada Research Chair (Tier 1) Distinguished University Professor in Polymer Reaction Engineering at McMaster University.

Zhu is a Fellow of the Royal Society of Canada (FRSC), the Canadian Academy of Engineering (FCAE), the Engineering Institute of Canada (FEIC), and the Chemical Institute of Canada (FCIC).
