= Munke Mølle =

Danish company founded in 1135

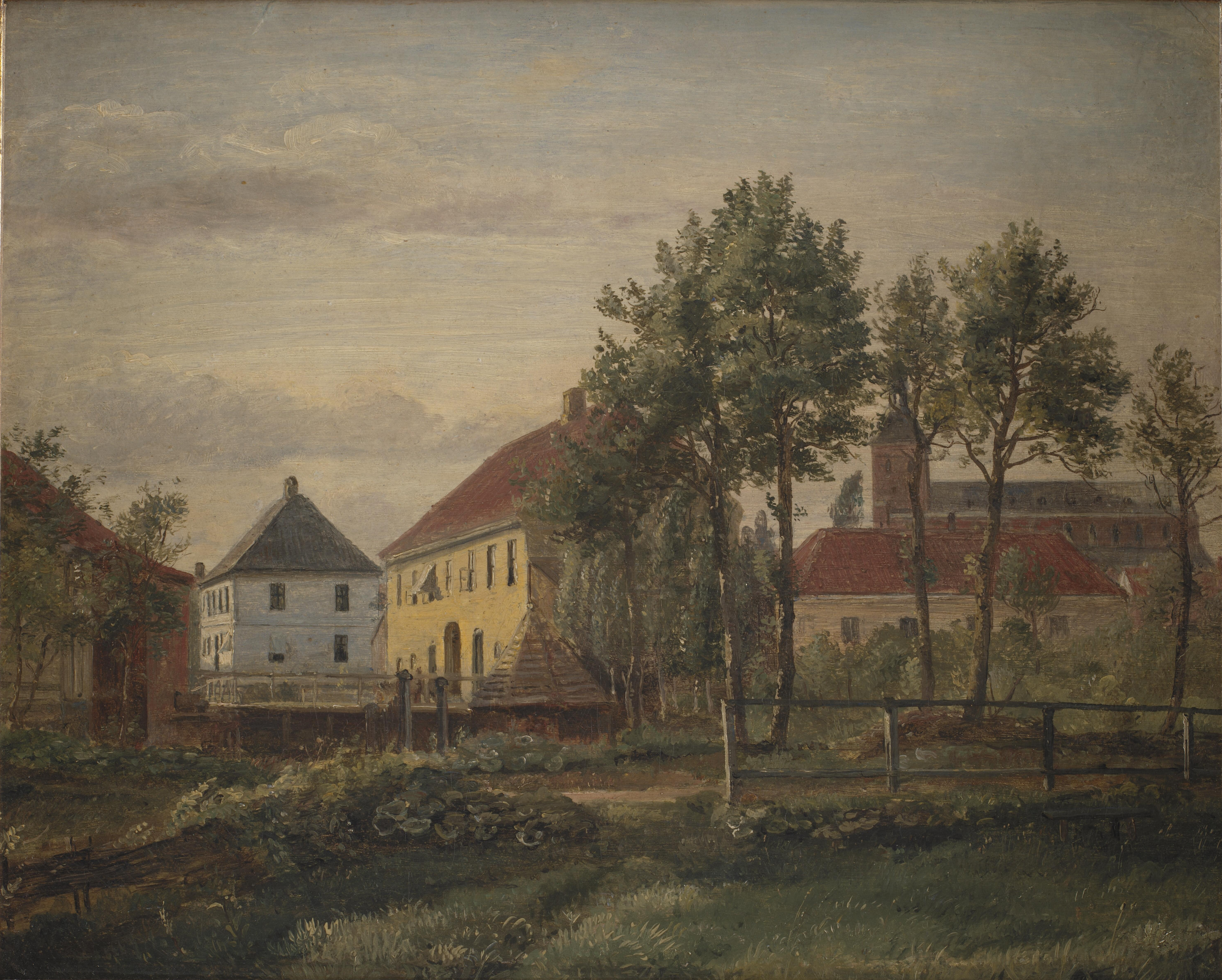
- Painting by Dankvart Dreyer, c. 1844
- Company type: Cooperative
- Industry: Food
- Founded: 1135
- Headquarters: Odense, Denmark

The Munke Mølle (transl. Monk Mill) is the oldest still functioning company in Denmark, being founded in 1135 as a water mill on the Odense River in Odense city. The mill has been a purveyor (Danish: Kongelig Hofleverandør) to 38 kings and 2 queens, and today produces bread and cake mixes.

== History ==
Munke Mølle is the longest running company in Denmark – it was founded by Benedictine monks in 1135. The mill for 90 years produced two of Denmark's most recognized brands "Gluten Flour" and "Amo", and has over the years provided flour for both private bakeries and the food industry.

- 1135 – The mill was founded in Odense by English Benedictine monks convened by Eric I of Denmark with the shrine in Odense Cathedral.
- 1536 – During the Protestant Reformation the mill was owned by the King and operated by the County men, later by millers in the lease.
- 1881 – The mill was purchased by an entrepreneur from Svendborg. From the ancient water mill he created in few years one of the most modern steam-powered commercial mills in Denmark.
- 1905 – The mill moved to the new buildings at Odense Harbour, where it still is located.
- 1919 – New generation industrial mills operating in America; launched the "Gluten Flour", one of Denmark's oldest and best-known brands. As an innovation Gluten Flour was delivered weighed in paper bags for retail. This packaging is still used as the flour must have oxygen in order not to lose its baking quality.
- 1960 – Munke Mølle purchased the Dampmøllen Victoria mills, also at Odense Harbour, producing the second best known Danish brand of flour "Amo".
- 1976 – Munke Mølle merged with Havnemøllerne in Fredericia and Copenhagen. Together they cover gradually the majority of the Danish flour market for households, craft and industrial bakeries.
- 1985 – Mill became supplier to the Royal Danish Court. Throughout the 1980s and 1990s it expanded production with bagemix for bread and buns, popular cut cakes, pizzas, waffles and pancakes, both for industrial and home baking.
- 1999 – Purchase of Drabæks Mill in Lunderskov, Denmark's largest producer of organic flour and breakfast cereals under the trademark "Kornkammeret".
- Today Monks Mill is part of the Cerealia Group operated by the Swedish agricultural cooperative Lantmännen.

== See also ==
- List of oldest companies
