= Pata tim =

Filipino pork dish

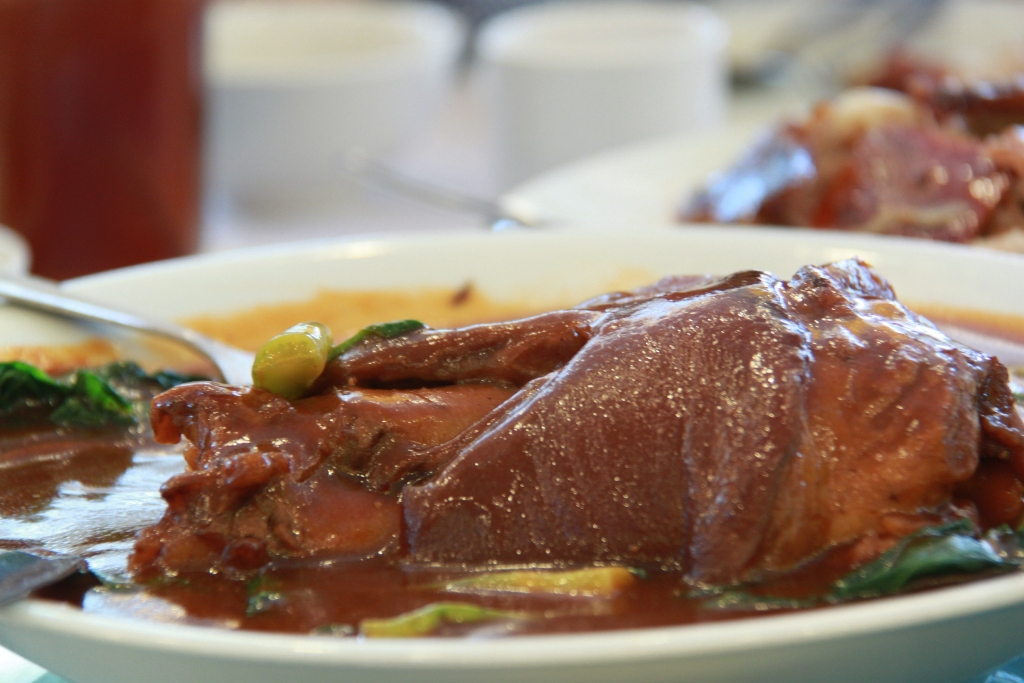
- Alternative names: Patatim
- Course: Main dish
- Place of origin: Philippines
- Serving temperature: Hot, warm
- Main ingredients: Pork hock, soy sauce, garlic, bay leaves, black peppercorns, muscovado, star anise, mushrooms
- Similar dishes: Paksiw na pata, humba, hamonado

Pata tim, also spelled patatim, is a Filipino braised pork hock dish slow-cooked until very tender in soy sauce, black peppercorns, garlic, bay leaves, and star anise sweetened with muscovado sugar. It also commonly includes péchay and mushrooms. The dish is commonly served in regions in the Philippines with large Chinese Filipino populations, especially in the Binondo district of Manila.

== Origin ==
Pata tim, like the more common humbà, is derived from the Chinese red braised pork. It is closer to the original dish than humbà, in that it sometimes uses Chinese rice wine and other Chinese spices and condiments. However, it is more commonly cooked closer to the Filipino paksiw na pata, but it does not use vinegar or uses only a very small amount of it. Like humbà, it can also add common Filipino ingredients like pineapples, banana flowers, saba bananas, and patis.

The name, pata tim, as part of the Filipino language is originally a combination of Tagalog: pata, lit. 'ham hock; pig's trotter; animal thigh', which originally itself was from Spanish: pata, lit. 'paw; foot; leg', and Hokkien Chinese: 𤆤; Pe̍h-ōe-jī: tīm; lit. 'to braise', 'to stew', forming the full term, pata tim, literally meaning "braised pork hock" as part of its origins from the Chinese dish, red braised pork.

== Description ==
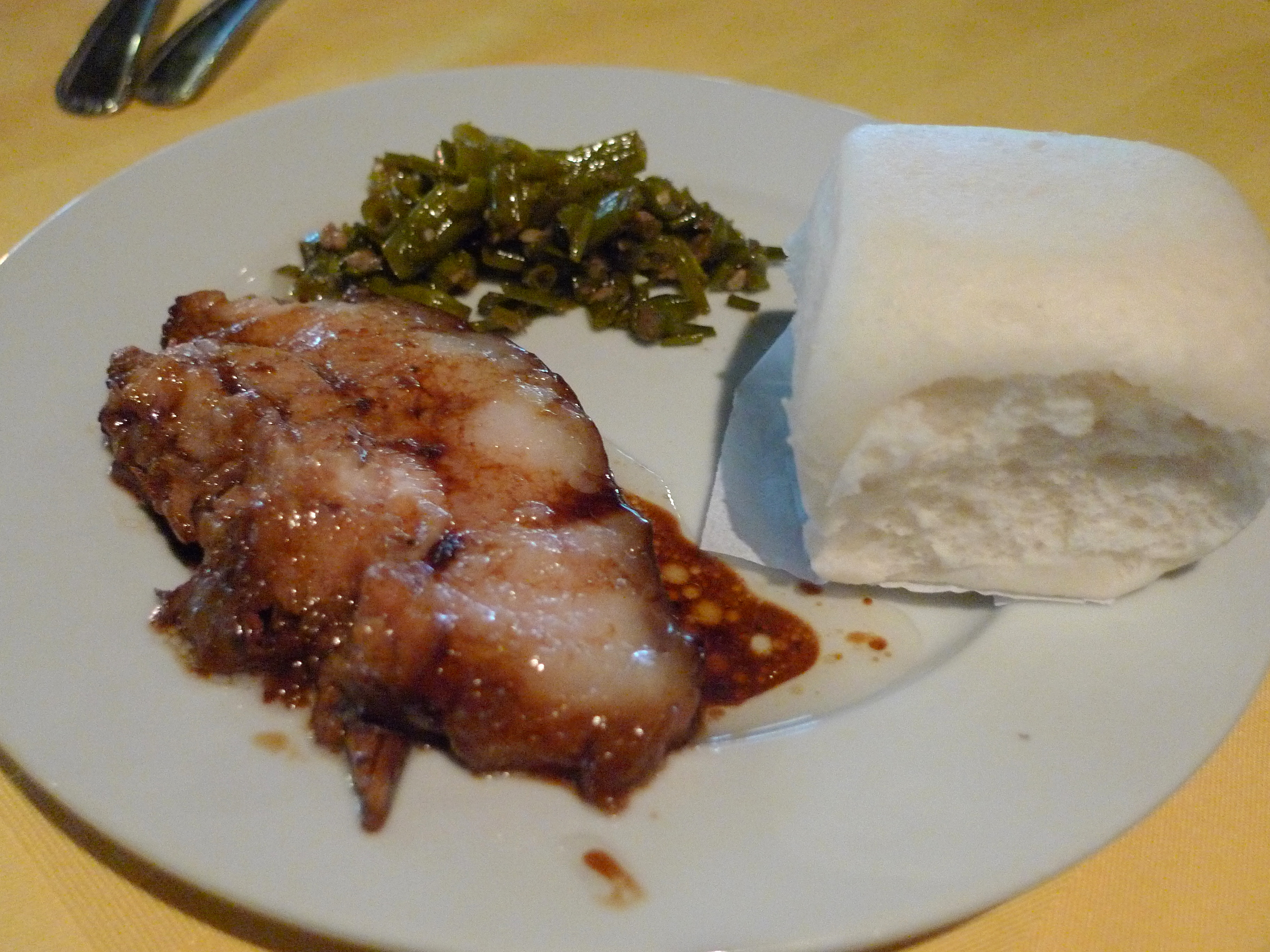
Pata tim with puto and green beans from Pampanga

The most basic pata tim recipe use pata (pork hock or pig's trotters). It is traditionally cooked whole and not chopped, unlike humbà. The hock is sometimes first marinated overnight in brine. It is then seared in oil in a large pan for a few minutes with mushrooms until lightly browned, then set aside. The rest of the ingredients, namely soy sauce, muscovado sugar (or brown sugar), garlic, black peppercorns, star anise, and bay leaves are added to a large pot of water and brought to a boil. The hock is added and boiled for a few minutes. The heat is lowered and the pot is allowed to simmer for a few hours until the meat is very tender. A pressure cooker can also be used to shorten the cooking time. The mushrooms and blanched péchay are added last. It is served with white rice.

The dish can be modified extensively. It can use other Chinese spices and condiments like sesame oil, Chinese rice wine, hoisin sauce, five spice powder, cinnamon bark, and so on. Though it can also use native condiments like patis (fish sauce). It can also include other ingredients like lettuce, green beans, shallots, sugarcane, banana flowers, saba bananas, and pineapples, among others. The sauce is naturally thick due to the gelatin in the hock, but in some recipes, cornstarch is added to achieve the same effect.

== See also ==
- Philippine asado
- Crispy pata
- Paksiw
- Kare-kare
