= I am from Xinjiang on the Silk Road =

- 我从新疆来
- Genre: Documentary
- Written by: Kurbanjan Samat
- Directed by: Kurbanjan Samat
- Country of origin: China
- Original language: Chinese
- No. of seasons: 1
- No. of episodes: 6

Production
- Producer: Wang Yanyu
- Production location: Xinjiang
- Cinematography: Wang Lu
- Editors: Liu Yingbing; Zhao Yinhu; Qin Hailong
- Running time: 25 minutes
- Production company: Shanghai Jianghan Culture Investment Development Co.

Original release
- Network: CCTV-9, Tencent Video, IQiyi, LeTV
- Release: 22 June 2016

I am from Xinjiang on the Silk Road (Chinese: 我从新疆来) is a documentary telling the story of Xinjiang people in contemporary China. The film focuses on the perspective of these individuals in order to show how they integrate themselves into society with different nationalities and cultures. A book has been published based on the series. It records the experiences of the photographer Kurbanjan Samat and 100 of his Xinjiang subjects who work and live in Mainland China on which I am from Xinjiang on the Silk Road is based.

The six-episode documentary was produced by Shanghai Jianghan Culture Investment Development Co. Ltd. and was jointly produced by the People's Political Consultative Conference Culture Media Co., Ltd., Suizhong Holdings, and the Beijing Dianyi Culture Communication Center. Director Chen Xiaoqing of A Bite of China served as advisor, director and actor; Chen Jianbin as artistic director; Tong Liya as the actress; and initiator of the Yanran Fund Li Yapeng as the co-producer. The former author Kurbanjan Semat was the general director and chief producer.

== Background ==
The documentary series was planned and directed by a Uygur, Kurbanjan Samat (قۇربانجان سەمەت). The original story of more than 100 ordinary Xinjiang people working and living in different ethnic groups and occupations; they were recorded in shots by Kurbanjan. He has stated that "With the recent frequent violent terrorist incidents, people no longer care about the beautiful scenery of Xinjiang." Stating that it destroys Xinjiang's public image.

== Episodes ==
The documentary I am from Xinjiang on the Silk Road portrays the lives of individuals from Xinjiang, spanning the past three decades. These individuals have relocated to major urban centers, such as Beijing, Shanghai, and Guangzhou.

=== Season 1 ===
The series includes six episodes with each episode concluding three stories of people. On the first episode, it was told that Abrati, the founder of the Guangzhou Flying club, used to be a dancer but decided to pursue his dream to learn how to become a paragliding coach.

=== Season 2 ===
The documentary I am Going to Xinjiang was produced by the Shanghai Jianghange Culture Company. It tells the story of ordinary people in China and also presents a story within the "One Belt One Road" style along the route. Kurbanjan Semat, who served as general director and chief producer, said that the shooting style is similar to I am from Xinjiang on the Silk Road. I am Going to Xinjiang will hold a documentary premiere at the Great Hall of the People in March 2018 and will officially air on the CCTV-9 and in online media, such as Tencent and IQIYI.

=== Season 3 ===
The third season of the documentary film was planned to start in 2018.

== Awards ==
- On 11 November 2016, I am from Xinjiang on the Silk Road won the 22nd China Television Documentary Award for Best Micro-Recording Works.
- On 12 June 2017, I am from Xinjiang on the Silk Road won the 2016 Outstanding Domestic Documentary.

== Reviews ==
The movie director, Chen Xiaoqing, has said that "Kurbanjan is my colleague and we work together for many years. As a photographer with outstanding talent, Kurbanjan is keen, diligent, and kind. As a Uighur youth, he has always had his own unique and profound understanding of the changes that have taken place in Xinjiang these years. This 'I come from Xinjiang' is his expression after a long period of precipitation. It is a true documentary."

A Chinese journalist, Bai Yansong, said that when he was "reading news, Xinjiang is sometimes very distant; when reading this book, Xinjiang is very familiar! In these pictures and texts, there is no one else but ourselves. It is unclear what these stories will change, but these stories appear before us and themselves are changes!" Jackie Chan, a famous martial artist, has stated about the movie: "This book records 100 stories with heart and photos, recording love and peace."
