= Drinking culture of the Philippines =

The Philippines has its own unique drinking culture and practices that are based on influences from its Austronesian heritage to the colonial influences of Spain, the United States, and Japan.

== History of Philippine drinking culture ==
The Philippines is an archipelago located in Southeast Asia. In 1521, Ferdinand Magellan, a Portuguese explorer, landed on the bays of Mactan, Cebu. This was the start of the Spanish colonization period in the Philippines. However, even before the colonizers arrived at the bays of the Philippines, cultures and tribes, with their own social structure and customs, already proliferated in the different parts of the archipelago. In fact, these ethnic groups already had products of fermented and alcoholic beverages. According to Blair and Robertson, Magellan first came upon coconut wine (tuba), or wine made out of coconut palm, and its distilled variety. A record describing how early Cebuanos made tuba states:

“They bore a hole into the heart of the said [coconut] palm at the top called palamito, from which distils a liquor which resembles white mist. That liquor is sweet but somewhat tart, and [is gathered] in canes [of bamboo] as thick as the leg and thicker. They fasten the bamboo to the tree at evening for the morning, and in the morning for the evening.“

== Types of liquor pre-Spanish period ==
According to Demeterio, early Visayans made five different kinds of liquor namely; Tubâ, Kabawaran, Pangasi, Intus, and Alak.

Tubâ, as said before, is a liquor made by boring a hole into the heart of a coconut palm which is then stored in bamboo canes.5 Furthermore, this method was brought to Mexico by Philippine tripulantes that escaped from Spanish trading ships.

Kabawaran is a pre-colonial alcoholic drink from the Visayas Islands of the Philippines made with honey and the pounded bark of the Neolitsea villosa.

Pangasi on the other hand, is made out of rice or wheat, so it can be considered as a variant of rice wine. It is inoculated with a yeast culture which the early Viasayans called “tapay”.

Intus is a wine made out of sugar canes. The juice of sugar canes are then boiled and reduced to half. Once this has reduced, this can be drunk already as it is. Some continue the process and add the same bark used in Kabawaran once the reduction has cooled down.

Alak is considered as the distilled version of any of the other four.

== Alcohol drinking etiquette ==
Early Filipinos, according to records, drank in large quantities. During ceremonies, events, and communal recreational activities, drinking was almost required while drinking during meals are often custom. Furthermore, refusing to accept the offer of alcohol was considered as disrespectful. Furthermore, food was often shared as members of the community would sing tunes.

According to Antonio Pigafetta, early Filipinos in Limasawa, Southern Leyte toasted in a specific manner. “They raise their hands to the heaven first, then take the drinking vessel in their right hand and extend the fist of their left hand toward the company." The now popular “tagay” originated from the same time period. The difference between this from the other manner of drinking is this generally refers to the round-robin style of sharing one drinking glass.

== Modern Philippine drinking culture ==
Today, Filipino drinking sessions are called inuman and are normally a planned event rather than an extension of a meal. The persons celebrating in an inuman perform tagayan as a cheers to the event. The person who pours drinks for the participants is called the tanggero. When the participants want to cheer they raise their glasses together and say "tagay".

Karaoke, mainly known locally as videoke, is a standard activity Filipinos participate in while drinking. Many inumans include a karaoke machine for the purpose of singing karaoke.

Filipinos sometimes perform "Alay sa Demonyo" before beginning their drinking sessions. Alay sa Demonyo means “offering to the devil”. The tanggero offers some of the alcohol by pouring it from the bottle cap, to the ground. This is to prevent spirits from disturbing the session as the party continues throughout the night.

People involved in an inuman are often members of a barkada or a family of relatives.

Finger foods eaten with the drinks are often called pulutan and commonly include the following foods: sisig, chicharon, lechon, inihaw and crispy pata.

There are also clubs and resto bars that people usually go to after-work to drink and chill with their peers, family and friends. These places are open during night time until midnight or early hours of the morning which are commonly crowded on weekends.
