= Taosi Township =

Taosi Township 陶寺乡
- Township
- Location in Shanxi
- Coordinates: 35°53′57″N 111°29′58″E
- Country: China
- Province: Shanxi
- Prefecture-level city: Linfen
- County: Xiangfen County

Area
  - Total: 78.06 km^{2} (30.14 sq mi)

Population (2018)
  - Total: 22,804
  - Density: 292.1/km^{2} (756.6/sq mi)
- Time zone: UTC+08:00 (China Standard)
- Postal code: 041500
- Area code: 0357

Chinese name
- Traditional Chinese: 陶寺鄉
- Simplified Chinese: 陶寺乡
Transcriptions
Standard Mandarin
- Hanyu Pinyin: Táosì Xiāng

Taosi Township (simplified Chinese: 陶寺乡; traditional Chinese: 陶寺鄉; pinyin: Táosì Xiāng) is a township in Xiangfen County, Shanxi, China. It is bordered by Dadeng Township to the north, Xincheng Town to the west, Yicheng County to the east, and Quwo County to the south. Taosi Township spans an area of 78.06 square kilometres (30.14 sq mi), and has a hukou population of 22,804 as of 2018.

== History ==
In the Mongolian ruling Yuan dynasty (1271–1368), it was known as "Anze Township" (安泽乡) of Xiangling County (襄陵县).

In the Ming dynasty (1368–1644), it was divided into eleven Li and in the following Qing dynasty (1644–1911), it was divided into six Li.

In 1918, it belonged to the Second District of Xiangling County.

In August 1953, it became a township and was divided into seven villages. In March 1956, Anli Township (安李乡) was merged into the township. In October 1958, it was renamed "Dongfeng People's Commune" (东风人民公社). In February 1984, it restored its former name as "Taosi Township".

=== Collapse of Juxian Restaurant ===
At around 9:40 a.m. on August 29, 2020, Juxian Restaurant (聚仙饭店), a restaurant located in Chenzhuang Village, collapsed, resulting in 29 deaths.

== Administrative divisions ==
As of 2017, the township is divided into 20 villages:

- Changyuan (常垣村)
- Taosi (陶寺村)
- Lizhuang (李庄村)
- Zhongliang (中梁村)
- Dongpogou (东坡沟村)
- Liujia (刘贾村)
- Xiaoliang (小梁村)
- Wangyun (王云村)
- Xingguang (兴光村)
- Beizhang (北张村)
- Anli (安李村)
- Chenzhuang (陈庄村)
- Zhangxiang (张相村)
- Zhangzai (张再村)
- Chongshi (崇实村)
- Yunhe (云合村)
- Jiashaxiang (贾沙向村)
- Cuijiazhuang (崔家庄村)
- Pandao (盘道村)
- Qingyang (青杨村)

== Geography ==
The township experiences a temperate continental monsoon climate, with an average annual temperature of 10.4 °C (50.7 °F), total annual rainfall of 454-millimetre (17.9 in), and an 2,522 hours of sunshine annually. There is a large temperature difference between day and night. It is dry and windy in the spring, humid and hot in the summer, frost in the early autumn, and dry and cold in the winter.

== Demographics ==
Taosi Township has a hukou population of 22,804 as of 2018.

In the 2010 Chinese Census, Taosi Township had a population of 19,723.

In 2008 Taosi Township had a population of 23,141.

In the 2000 Chinese Census, Taosi Township had a population of 26,139.

== Economy ==
The local economy is primarily based upon agriculture and industry. The township is rich in gold, iron and gypsum.

The main fruit grown in Taosi Township is jujube, and the main livestock is chicken.

== Attractions ==
Taosi is an archaeological site in the township. The earliest evidence of writing in China was found here which is 800 years before the oracle bone inscriptions of the Shang Dynasty.
