= Philippine asado =

Filipino meat dish

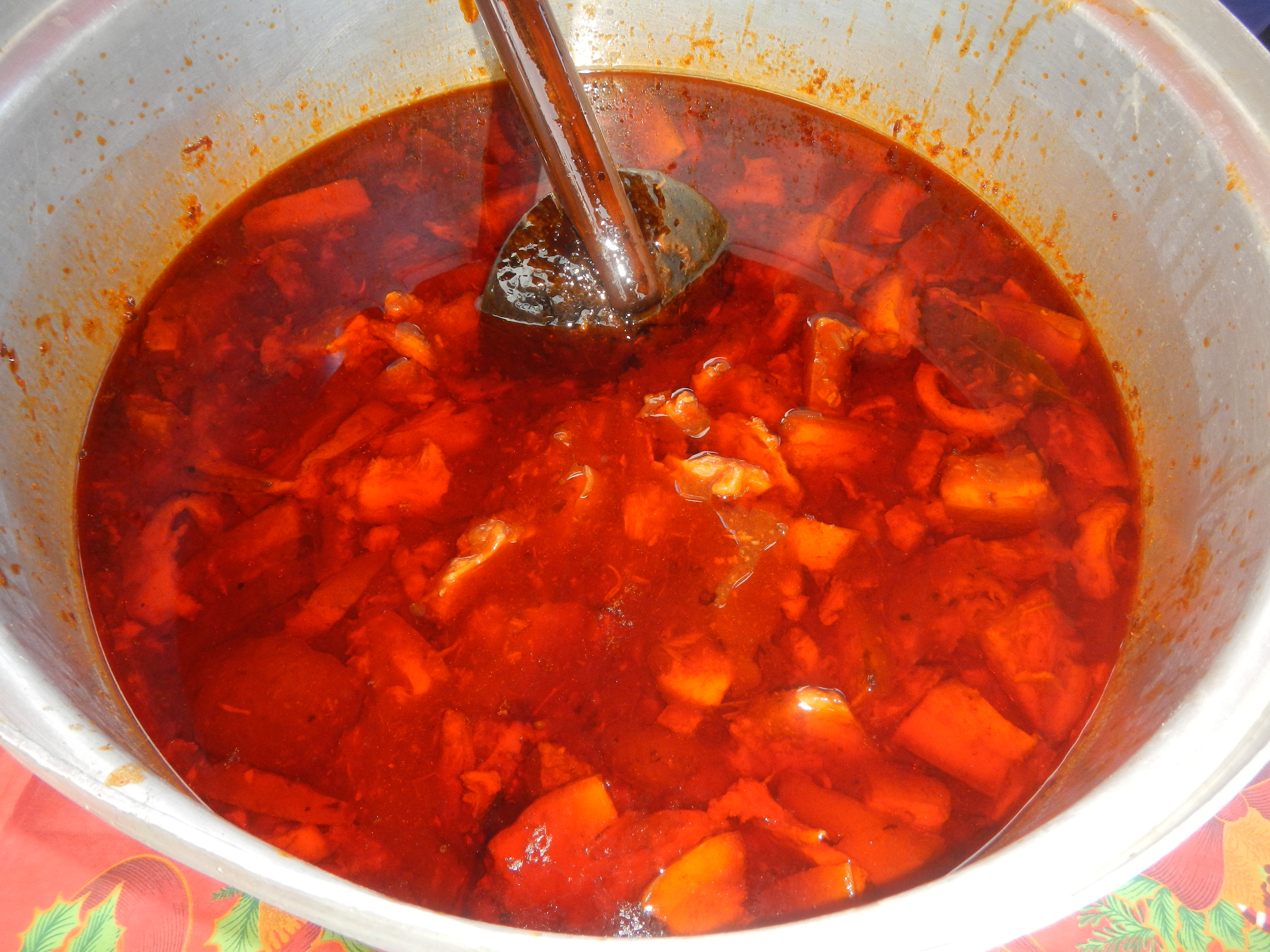
- Pork asado from Pampanga
- Course: Main course
- Place of origin: Philippines
- Associated cuisine: Filipino cuisine
- Serving temperature: Hot
- Variations: Asado de carajay; Asado matua; pork asado
- Similar dishes: Humba, pata tim, adobo, hamonado

Philippine asado refers to two different Filipino braised meat dishes. The name originates from Spanish asado ("grilled"), a reference to the original dish it was applied to, the Chinese-Filipino version of char siu barbecues usually known as pork asado. However, Filipino versions have evolved to be braised, not grilled. The other Filipino dishes also known as asado are asado de carajay and asado matua. Unlike the Chinese-derived version, they are savory rather than sweet.

== Variations ==
=== Asado de carajay ===
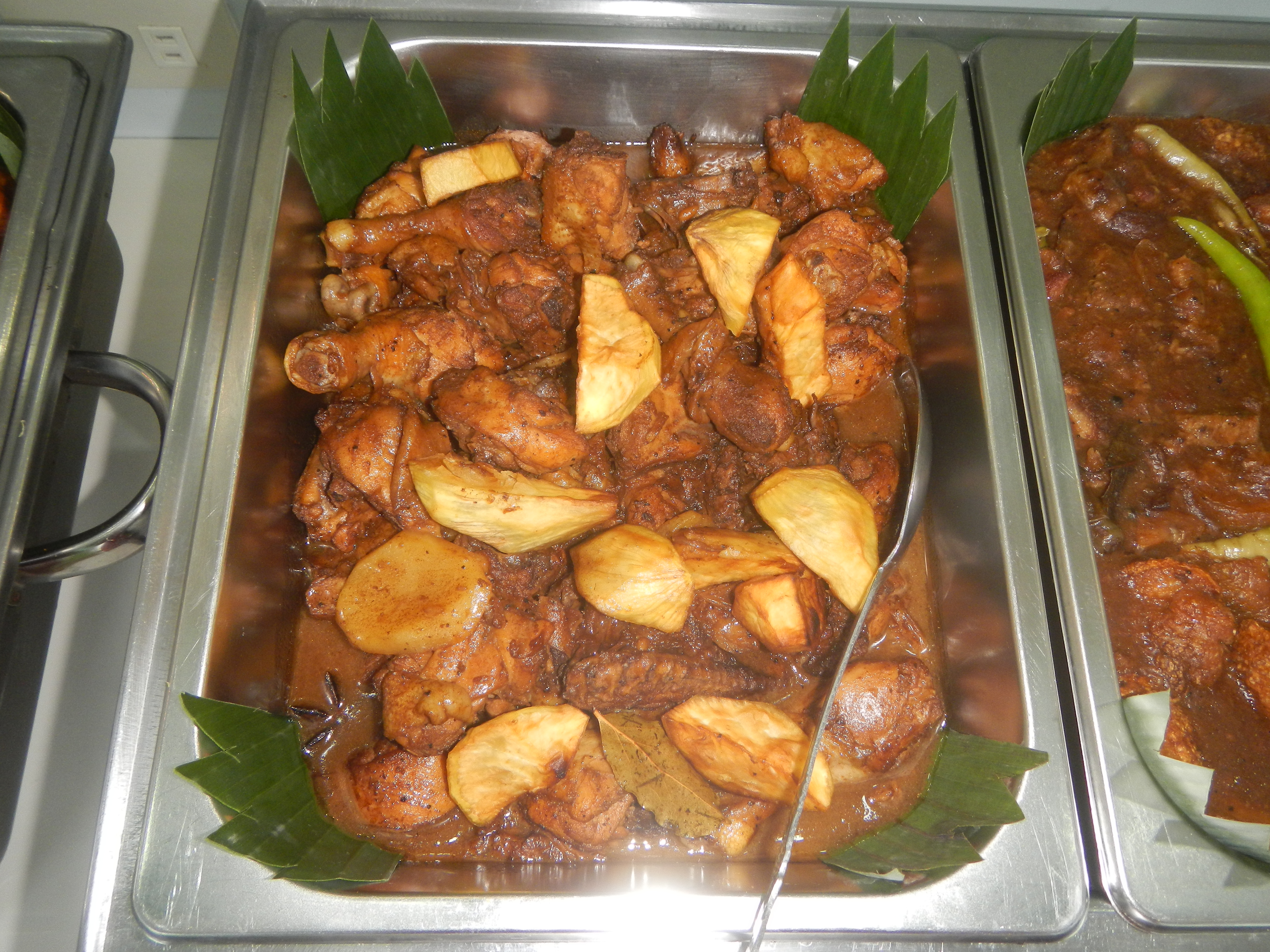
Chicken asado de carajay from Baliuag, Bulacan

Asado de carajay is a native asado. The name is derived from Philippine Spanish carajay ("wok", or kalaha in Philippine languages). Asado de carajay is made with meat (pork, beef, or chicken) braised in soy sauce, bay leaves, peppercorns, calamansi, onions, and various vegetables (usually tomatoes, potatoes, mushrooms, and carrots). It is traditionally cooked in a wok, hence the name.

Asado de carajay is differentiated from the "Chinese-style" pork asado in the use of vegetables, the absence of Chinese spices, and its savory flavor. It is also not restricted to pork, but can be cooked with beef or chicken.

=== Asado matua ===
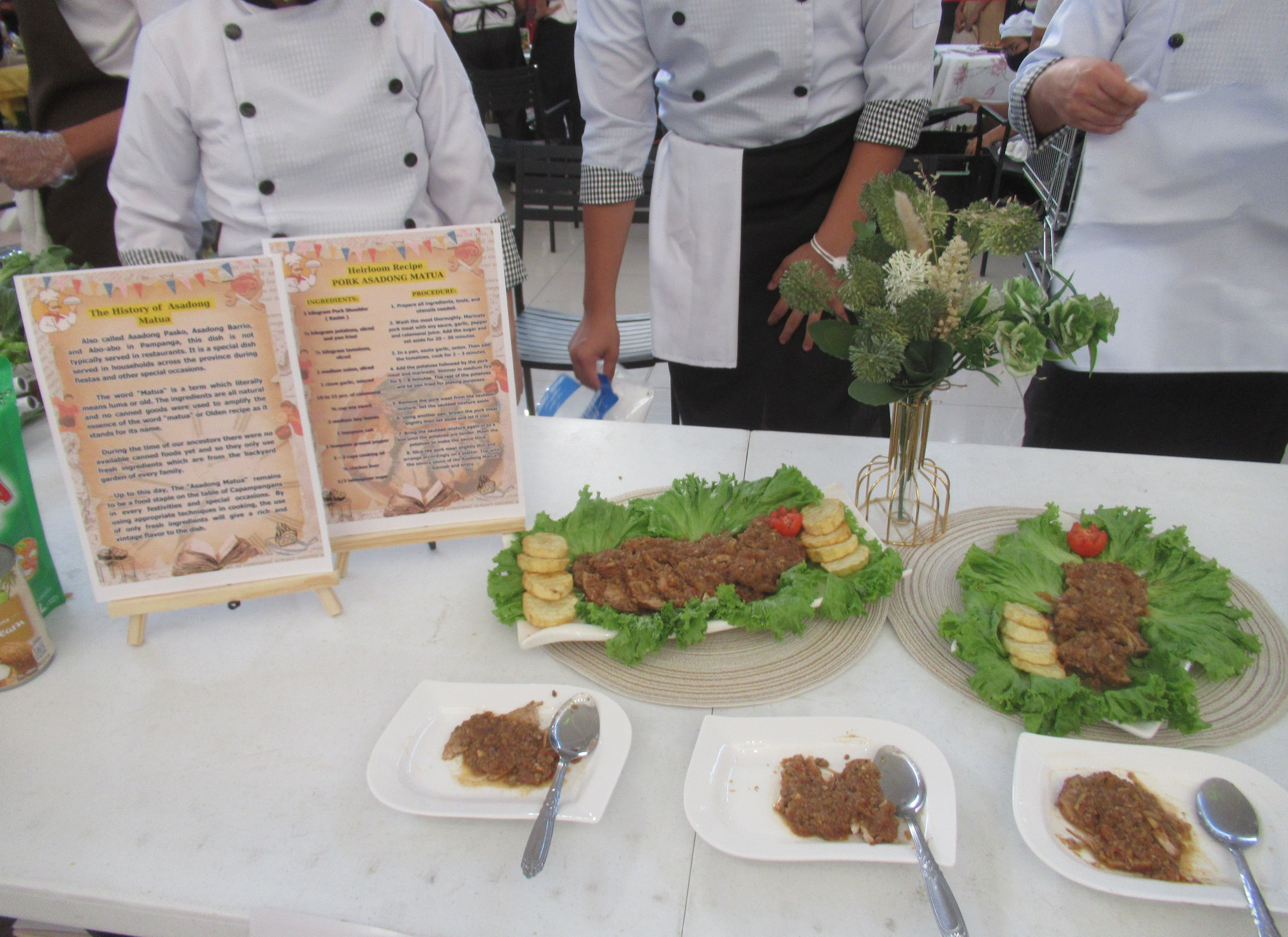
Asado matua

Asado matua (Kapampangan for "old-fashioned/traditional asado") is a unique variation of asado de carajay that originates from Pampanga. It uses whole pork rump or shoulder (known as kasim) slow-cooked in a sauce with tomatoes, potatoes, calamansi, oregano, garlic, onion, black pepper, soy sauce, salt, and oil. Variations in different household recipes also add other ingredients like grated cheese, chorizo de Bilbao, chicken liver, pickles, and/or Vienna sausages.

Asado matua is also known as "Kapampangan asado", asadong Pasko, asadong barrio, and abo-abo, among other names, due to their association with fiestas in the province of Pampanga.

=== Pork asado ===
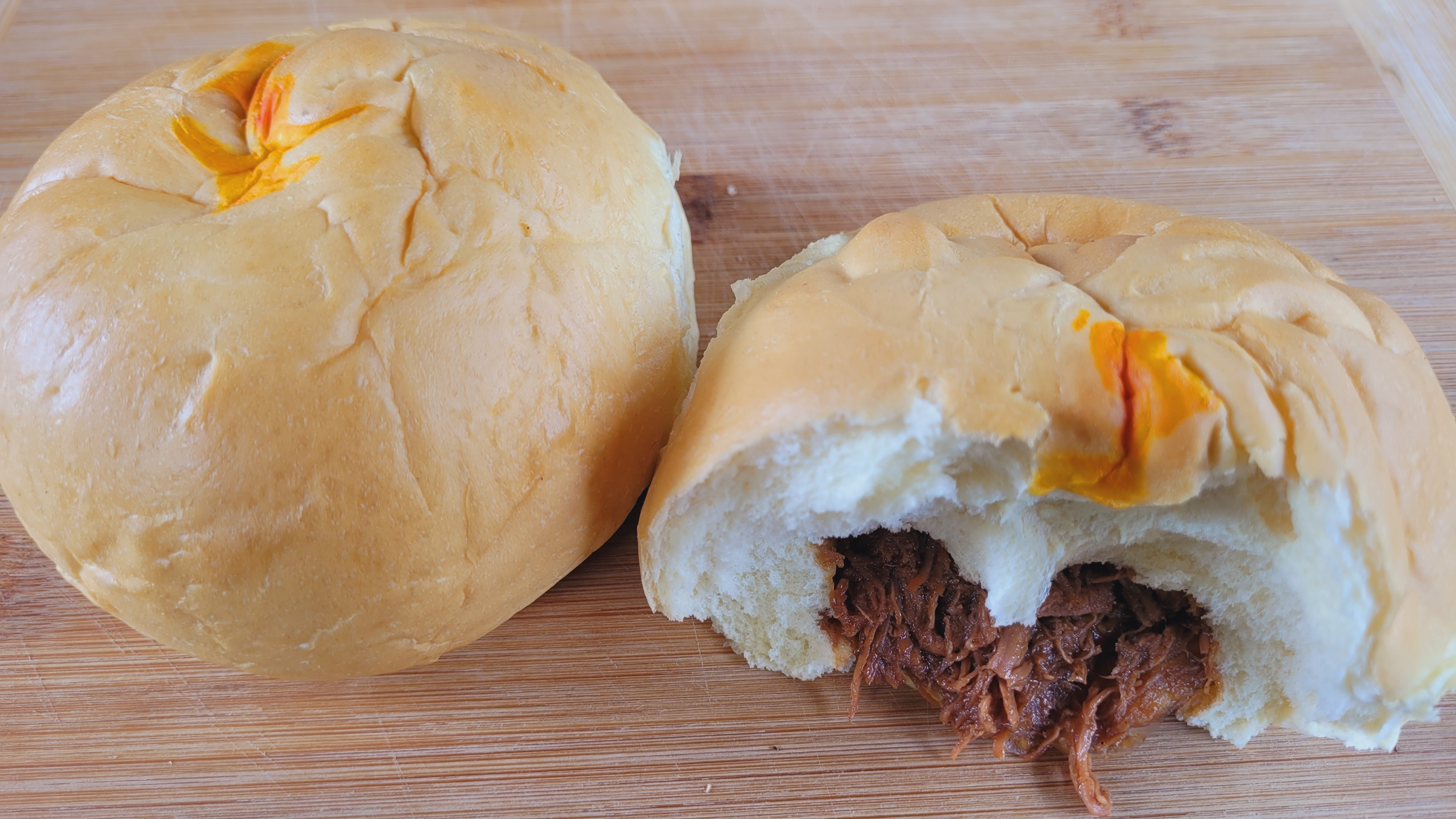
Pork asado buns

Pork asado, also known as "Chinese" asado or "Chinese-style" asado, is the variant most commonly associated with the name asado. It is derived from the Chinese dish char siu, and possibly also influenced by the Hokkien dish tau yew bak. Unlike char siu, however, the dish is always braised, not grilled or roasted. The dish is made with pork braised in soy sauce, garlic, bay leaves, onion, brown sugar, and various Chinese spices (usually star anise and five spice). It is very similar to humba and pata tim, which also originate from Chinese-Filipino migrants. It also resembles hamonado, because of its sweetness, though hamonado uses pineapple and is a native dish.

Pork asado is usually sliced thinly and served with the braising liquid. Pork asado is also commonly shredded and used as fillings for sandwiches and buns. It is also the primary filling of the Filipino siopao, which is also known as siopao asado.

A variant of pork asado is the "Macau-style" pork asado. It uses the same ingredients but differs primarily in that the meat is not broiled beforehand, but rather boiled directly in the marinade until tender.

== See also ==
- Humba
- Pata tim
- Chicken karahi - An Indian meat and vegetable curry named after and braised in a wok (karahi in Indian languages)
- Cuisine of the Philippines
- List of Philippine dishes
