= Humba =

Filipino braised pork dish

Humbà
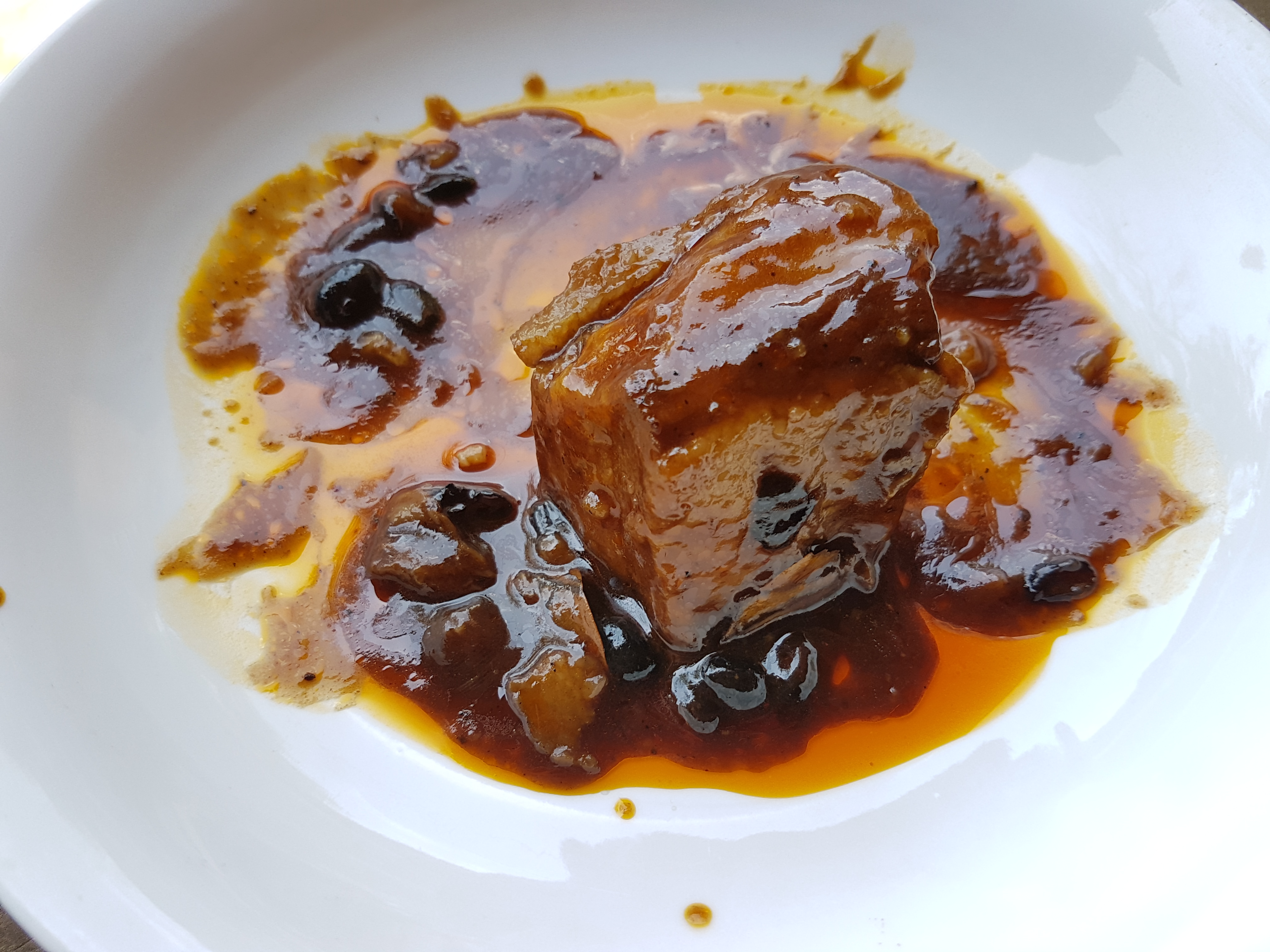
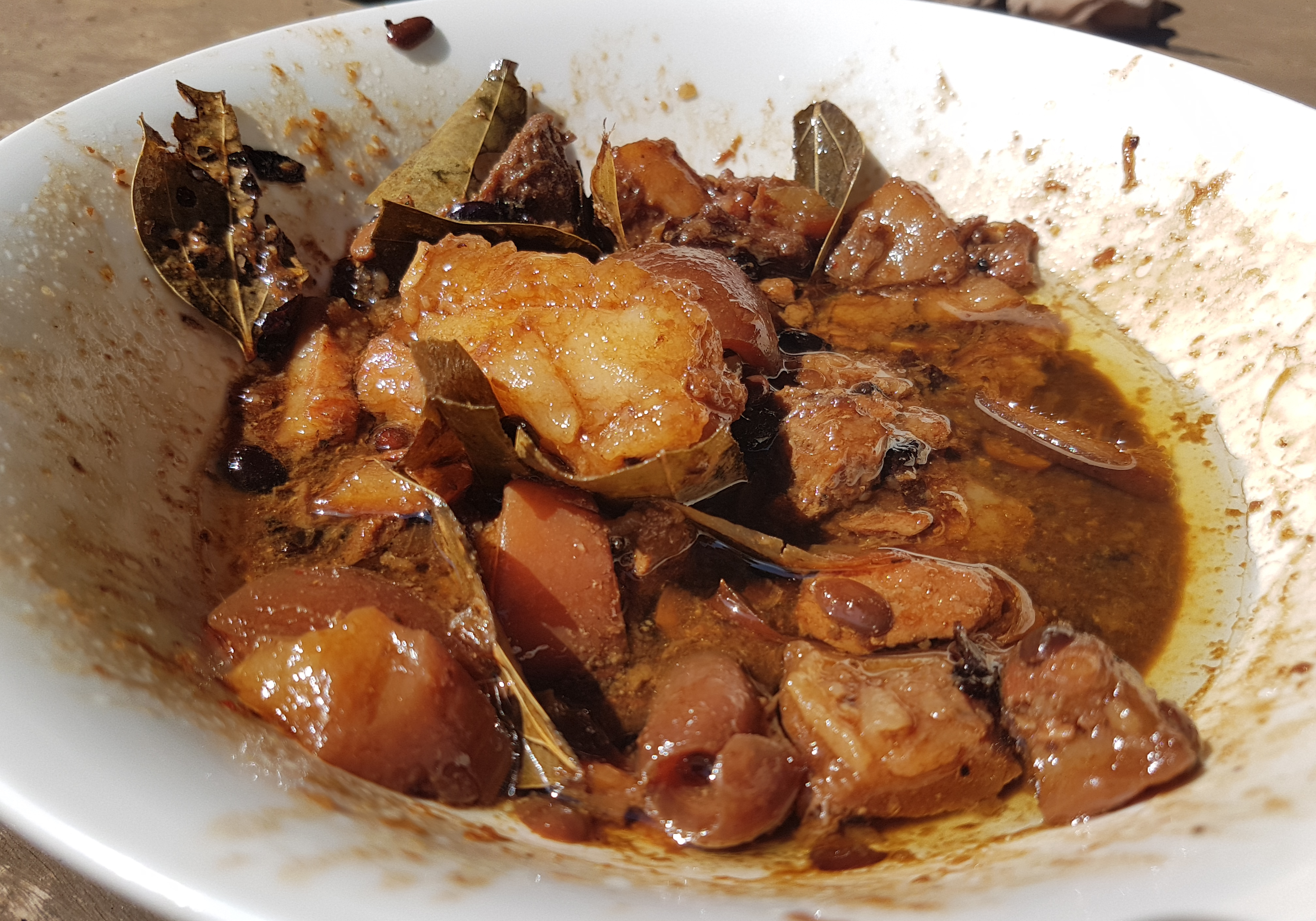
- Alternative names: Hombà
- Course: Main dish
- Place of origin: Philippines
- Region or state: Visayas
- Serving temperature: Hot, warm
- Main ingredients: Pork belly, soy sauce, garlic, vinegar, bay leaves, fermented black beans, black peppercorns, muscovado
- Similar dishes: Philippine adobo, pata tim, hamonado

Humbà, also spelled hombà, is a Filipino braised pork dish from the Visayas, Philippines. It traditionally uses fatty cuts of pork belly slow-cooked until very tender in soy sauce, vinegar, black peppercorns, garlic, bay leaves, and fermented black beans (tausi) sweetened with muscovado sugar. It also commonly includes hard-boiled eggs and banana blossoms.

== Origin ==
Humba is derived from the Chinese red braised pork belly (Hokkien Chinese: 封肉; Pe̍h-ōe-jī: hong-bah / hong-mah; lit. 'roast meat'; also known in Mandarin Chinese: 紅燒肉; pinyin: hóngshāoròu; lit. 'red cooked meat') introduced to the Philippines via Hokkien immigrants, but it differs significantly from the original dish in that Filipino humba has evolved to be cooked closer to Philippine adobo, using a lot more vinegar. Humba also does not traditionally use rice wine, ginger, chilis, or five-spice powder; and it commonly use additional ingredients like banana flowers or pineapples, which are absent in the original dish. Regardless, traces of its Chinese origin is still evident in the primary use of fermented black beans (tausi), an uncommon ingredient in native Filipino cuisine. Humba is likely precolonial in origin and its precursor variant and ingredients were likely brought to the Visayas by Hokkien migrants.

== Description ==
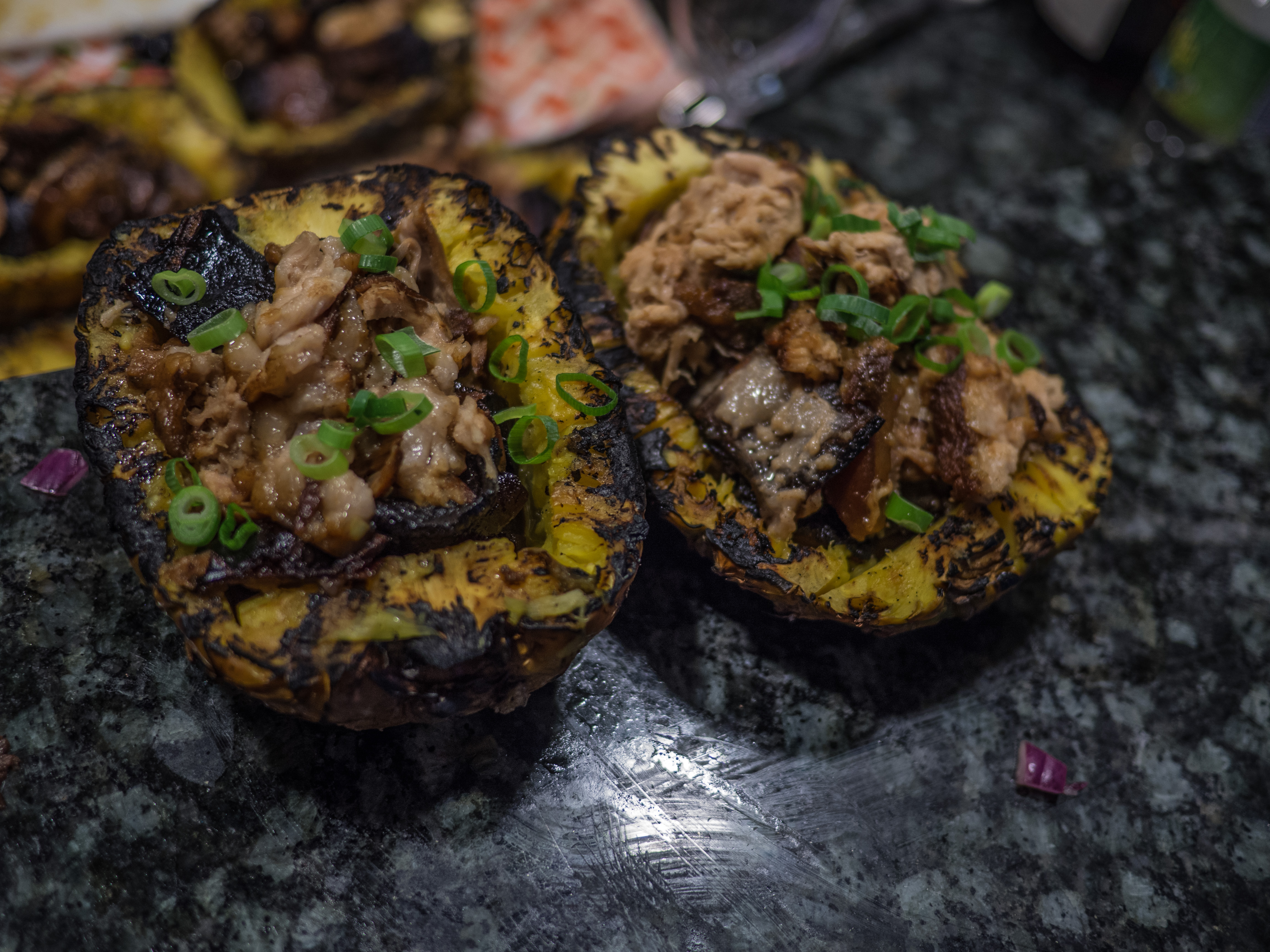
Humbà in pineapple

The defining ingredient of humba is the fermented black beans (tausi), without which it is basically just a slightly sweeter Philippine adobo. Like adobo it has many different variants, but it is relatively easy to prepare albeit time-consuming.

The most basic humba recipe uses fatty cuts of pork, usually the pork belly (liempo). It is marinated in a mixture of soy sauce, vinegar, garlic, bay leaves, and black peppercorns. The pork is then sautéed with the garlic. Once the meat is half-cooked and lightly browned, water is added with the rest of the ingredients along with fermented black beans and muscovado sugar (or some other sweetening agent). Banana blossoms may also be added. It is then allowed to simmer for a few hours until the meat is very tender. Alternatively, it can be cooked in a pressure cooker to cut down the cooking time. Hard-boiled eggs may be added before serving. It is eaten with white rice.

== Variants ==
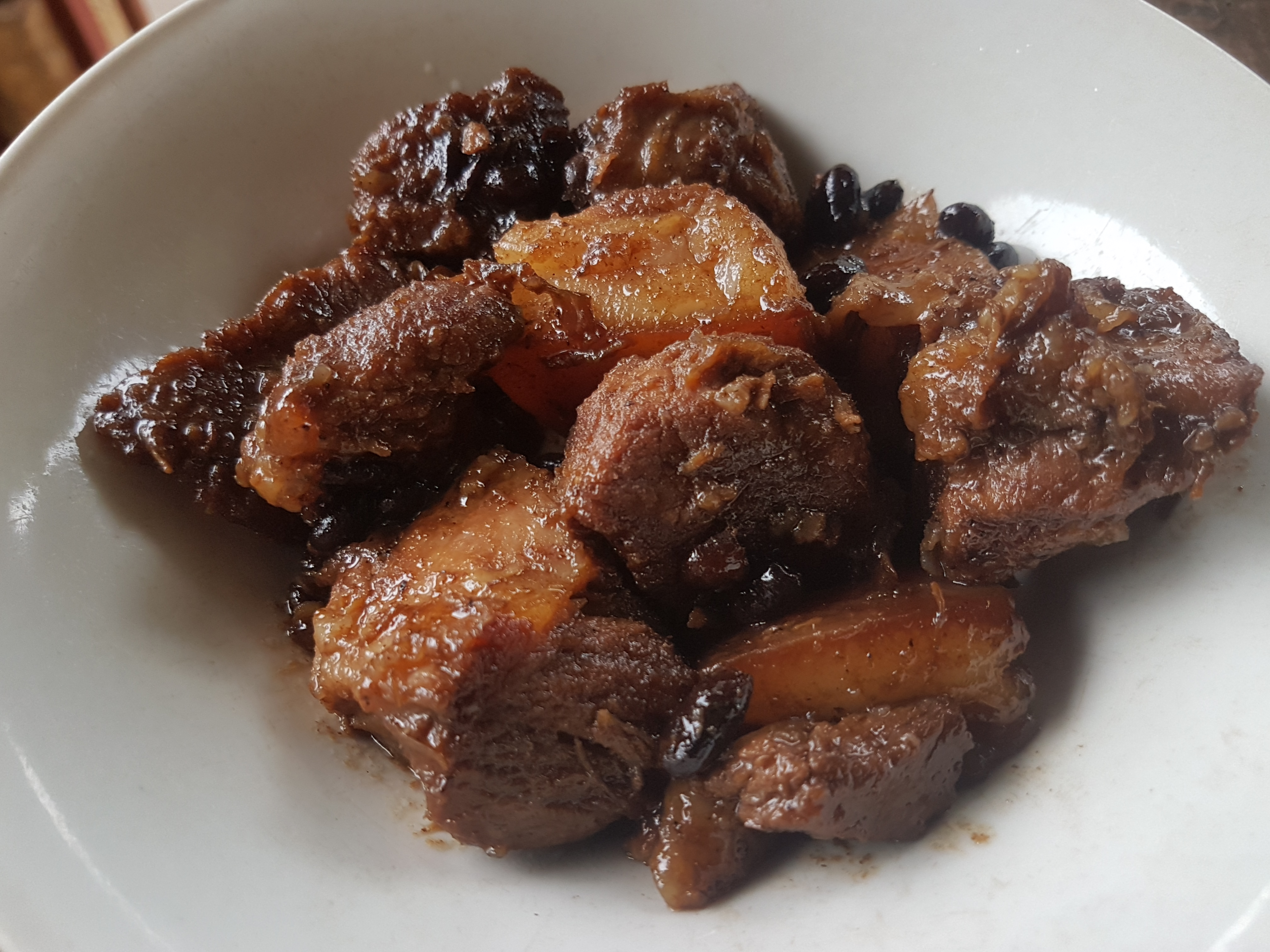

Humba can sometimes be prepared with chicken, in which case it is more or less identical to Philippine chicken adobo, except for the use of tausi. It can also be prepared with pineapples as the sweetener, which again makes it very similar to another Filipino dish, the hamonado.

A similar dish to humba is pata tim, which is also derived from Chinese red braised pork belly. But pata tim does not use vinegar or tausi and primarily uses pork hock with péchay and mushrooms.

== Cultural significance ==
The humba is known as the main delicacy of the town of Ronda in the province of Cebu. Every year, the town holds the Humba Festival to promote the local cuisine of the town. The festival is also considered a religious festival and is celebrated around the feast day of the town's patron saint, Our Lady of Sorrows, which falls on September 15. During the festival, there are humba cooking contests and religious dance offerings in honor of the Blessed Virgin. This is generally a week-long affair and all activities are aimed at promoting the humba of Ronda.

== See also ==
- Braised pork rice
- Kare-kare
- Paksiw
- Philippine asado
