= Mianwo =

Chinese donut

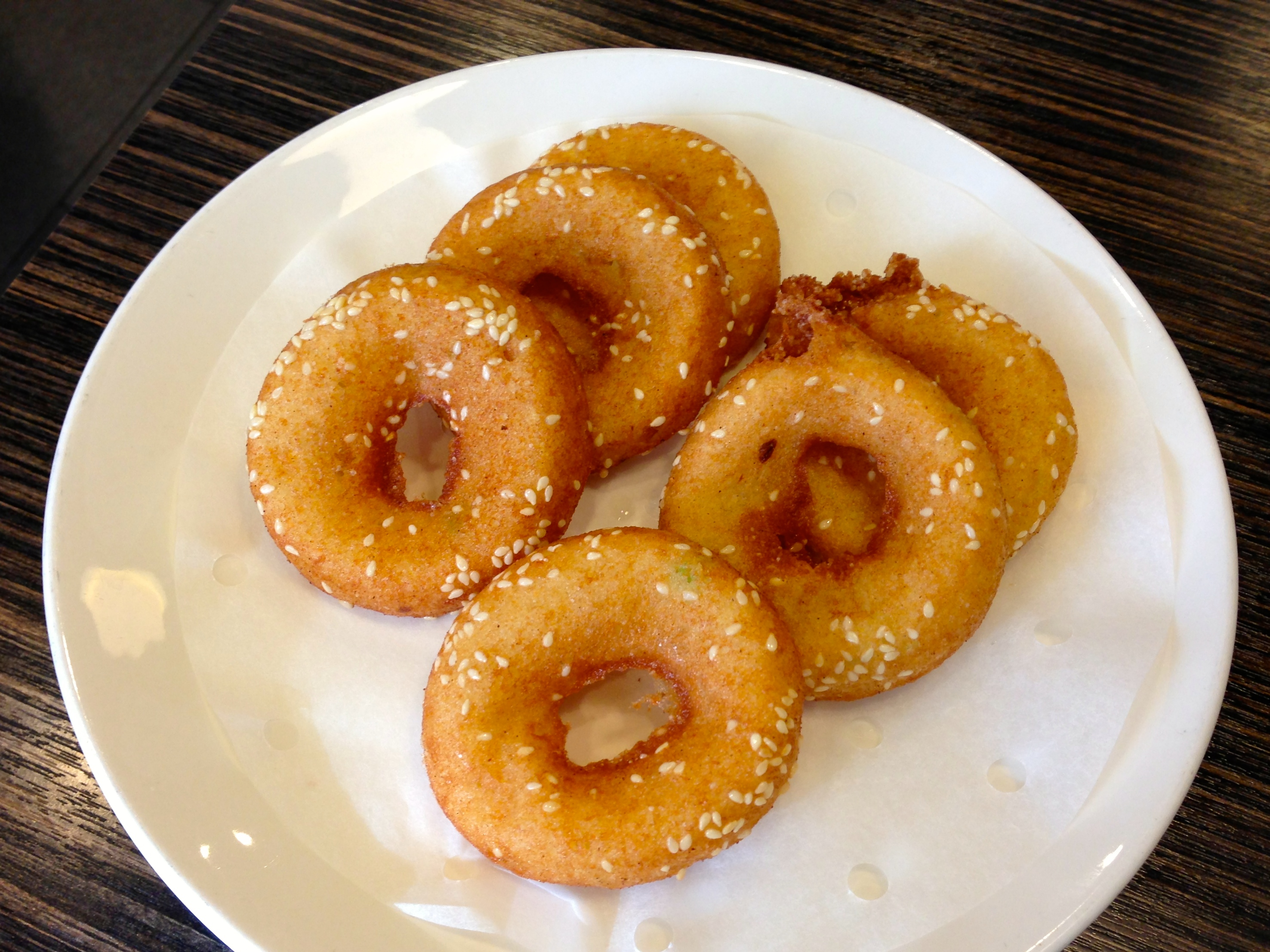
- A plate of Mianwo from Wuhan
- Traditional Chinese: 麵窩
- Simplified Chinese: 面窝
Transcriptions
Standard Mandarin
- Hanyu Pinyin: miàn wō
Yue: Cantonese
- Jyutping: min6 wo1

Mianwo is a deep-fried, donut-shaped snack from Wuhan in Hubei province in central China. It is made from soy milk, rice milk, flour, sesame, and chopped Chinese scallion. Mianwo usually has a salty taste, but a sweeter variant may be made with diced sweet potato.

The origin of Mianwo is uncertain, but tradition dates it back to the Guangxu era of the Qing Dynasty (1875–1909). A local sesame cake maker, Chang Ziren, supposedly created the first Mianwo while experimenting with novel seed cake varieties in Hankou.

== See also ==
- Hubei cuisine
