= Dingcun =

Dingcun 丁村村
- Village
- Location in Shanxi
- Coordinates: 35°50′28″N 111°24′48″E
- Country: People's Republic of China
- Province: Shanxi
- Prefecture-level city: Linfen
- County: Xiangfen County
- Town: Xincheng (新城镇)

Dingcun (Chinese: 丁村村) is an old village located in Xincheng (新城镇), Xiangfen County, approximately 28 kilometers south of Linfen, in southern Shanxi Province, China.

== Site description ==
Historical residential courtyards in Dingcun consist of a number of "foursquare" courtyards with buildings on the four directions including the main halls, the wing rooms along the east and west sides, the corridors and the entrance gateways. It has totally 40 complete sets of "four-square" courtyards 598.5 jian (Jian: the smallest unit of a building, approximately 15 square meters each) rooms and covers an area of 48000 square meters.

== History ==
The earliest courtyards were built in the 21st year in the reign of the Wanli Emperor (1593) of the Ming dynasty and the latest ones were of early republican period. Generally speaking, the total structure can be divided into three sections, the north courtyards, the middle courtyards and the south courtyards. These three sections respectively consisted of buildings of the Ming dynasty, the early and middle periods of the Qing dynasty and that of the later period of the Qing dynasty. These are one of the representative pieces of folk architecture of the Ming and Qing dynasties in North China. Since these buildings were built in different times, their layout and style are different.

== World Heritage status ==
This site was added to the UNESCO World Heritage Tentative List on February 12, 1996 in the Cultural category.
