= Yanduxian =

Jiangnan cuisine

Yāndǔxiān
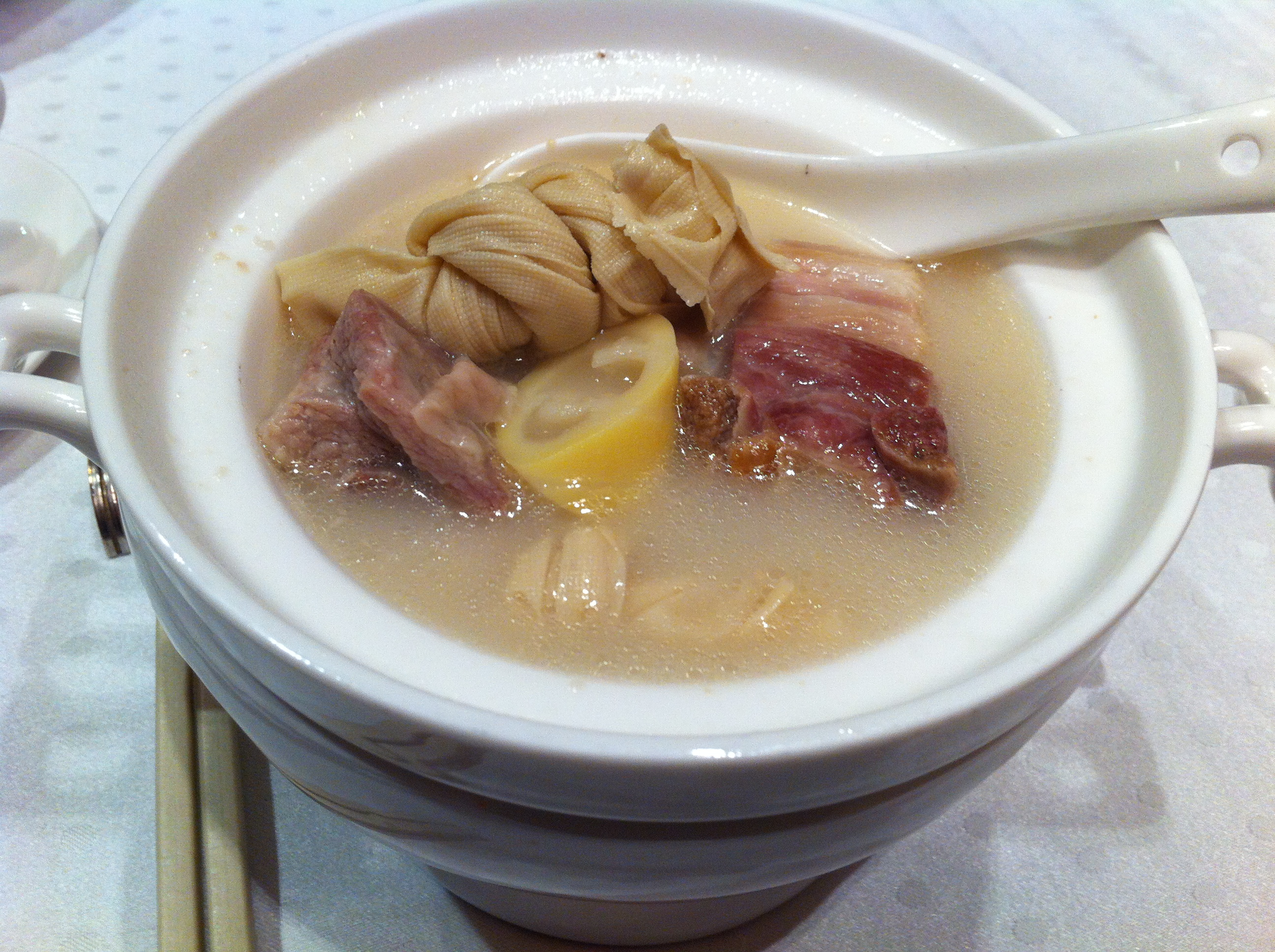
- Ham and Pork Shank soup with winter bamboo
- Place of origin: China
- Region or state: Jiangnan

Yāndǔxiān (腌笃鲜) is a Chinese soup dish from Shanghai and Jiangsu province (a.k.a. Jiangnan region). It's made from a duo of cured pork and fresh pork with fresh winter bamboo shoots and tofu skin.

== Origin ==
Many Chinese dishes have names adopted from folklore. "Yān" means salted pork, and "dǔ" represents the sound of the boiling soup, and "xiān" describe the delicate flavor of the soup. Yāndǔxiān is one of the typical local cuisine.

== Recipe ==
Common ingredients are pork ham shank, bone-in ham, fresh winter bamboo shoot, fresh ginger root, ground white pepper, pork stock, water, and scallions.

== See also ==
- Cuisine of China
