= Crispy pata =

Filipino dish

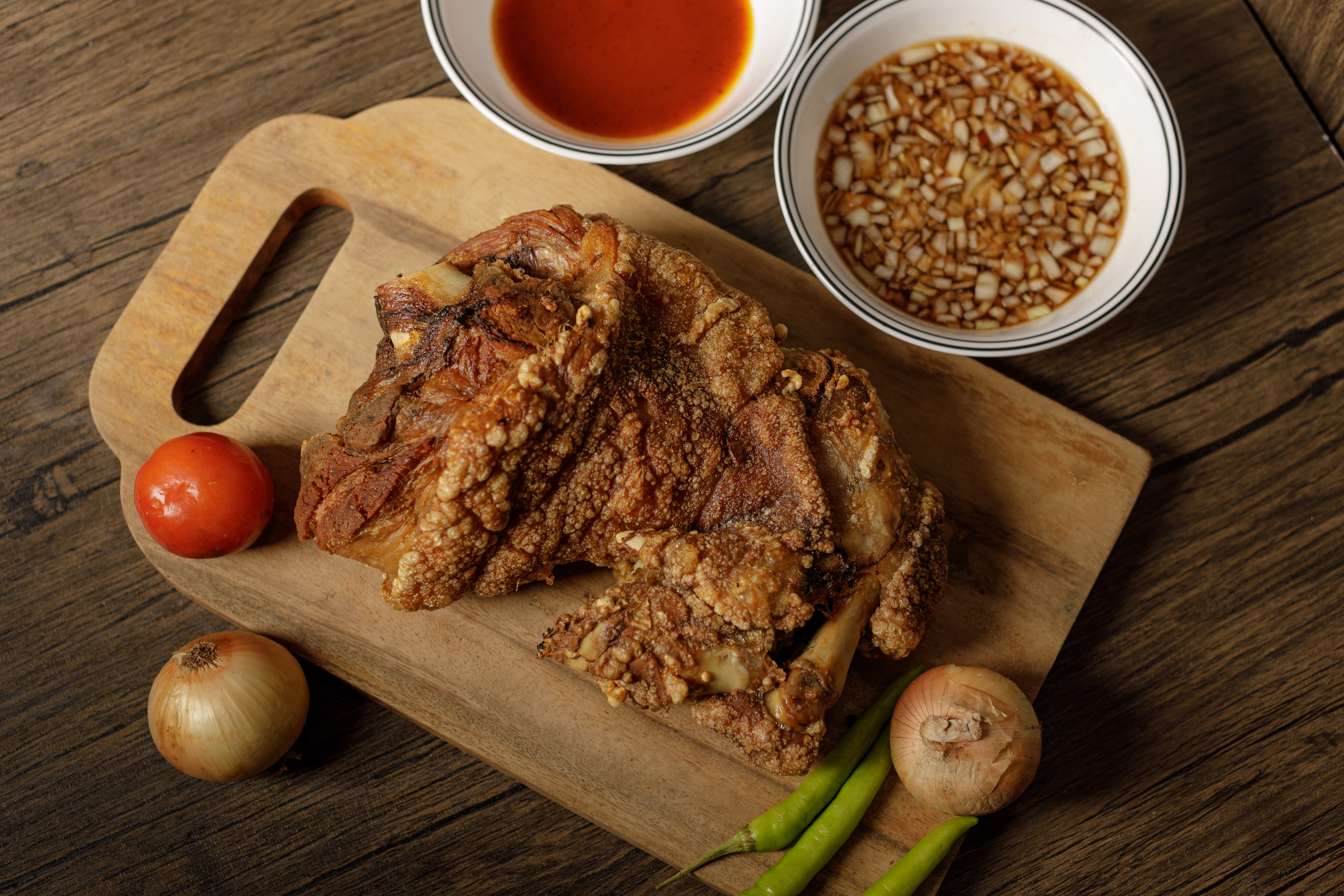
- Course: Main course
- Place of origin: Philippines
- Main ingredients: Deep fried pig trotters or knuckles served with a soy-vinegar dip

Crispy pata is a Filipino dish consisting of deep fried pig trotters or knuckles served with a soy-vinegar dip. It can be served as party fare or an everyday dish. Many restaurants serve boneless pata as a specialty. The dish is quite similar to the German Schweinshaxe.

== See also ==
- Bagnet
- List of deep fried foods
- List of Philippine dishes
- List of pork dishes
- Pata tim
- Philippine cuisine
