= Cut cake =

Confectionery made with candied fruit

- Alternative names: qiegao, maren
- Type: cake
- Place of origin: Xinjiang
- Associated cuisine: Uyghur cuisine

Cut cake, also maren candy (瑪仁糖), maren (麻仁), or qiēgāo, is a confectionery made with candied fruit, corn syrup, flour and nuts. It is a traditional snack of the Uyghur ethnic group in Xinjiang, China. Cut cake is made in large blocks, and sold by cutting slices from the block, hence the name "cut cake".

The practice of cutting slices much larger than requested, followed by insistence on purchase of the entire piece, has given few of the dessert’s sellers (“peddlers”) a bad reputation.

In December 2012, the "Sky-high Price Cut Cake Incident" in Yueyang resulted from a local government post on Sina Weibo, describing the government's response to a public brawl involving cut cake peddlers and locals.

== History ==
=== Yueyang Sky-high Price Cut Cake Incident ===
On the 3rd of December 2012, the Yueyang Public Security Bureau posted a report on Sina Weibo about a brawl involving locals and Uyghur peddlers which ended with two people injured and the destruction of peddlers' product. The post said that one local villager was detained, while the Uyghur peddlers were reimbursed CN¥200,000. The post resulted in a flood of internet commentary resentful of the exorbitant reimbursement price offered to the peddlers following the incident.
