= Suichang County =

County in Zhejiang, China

Suichang 遂昌县
- County
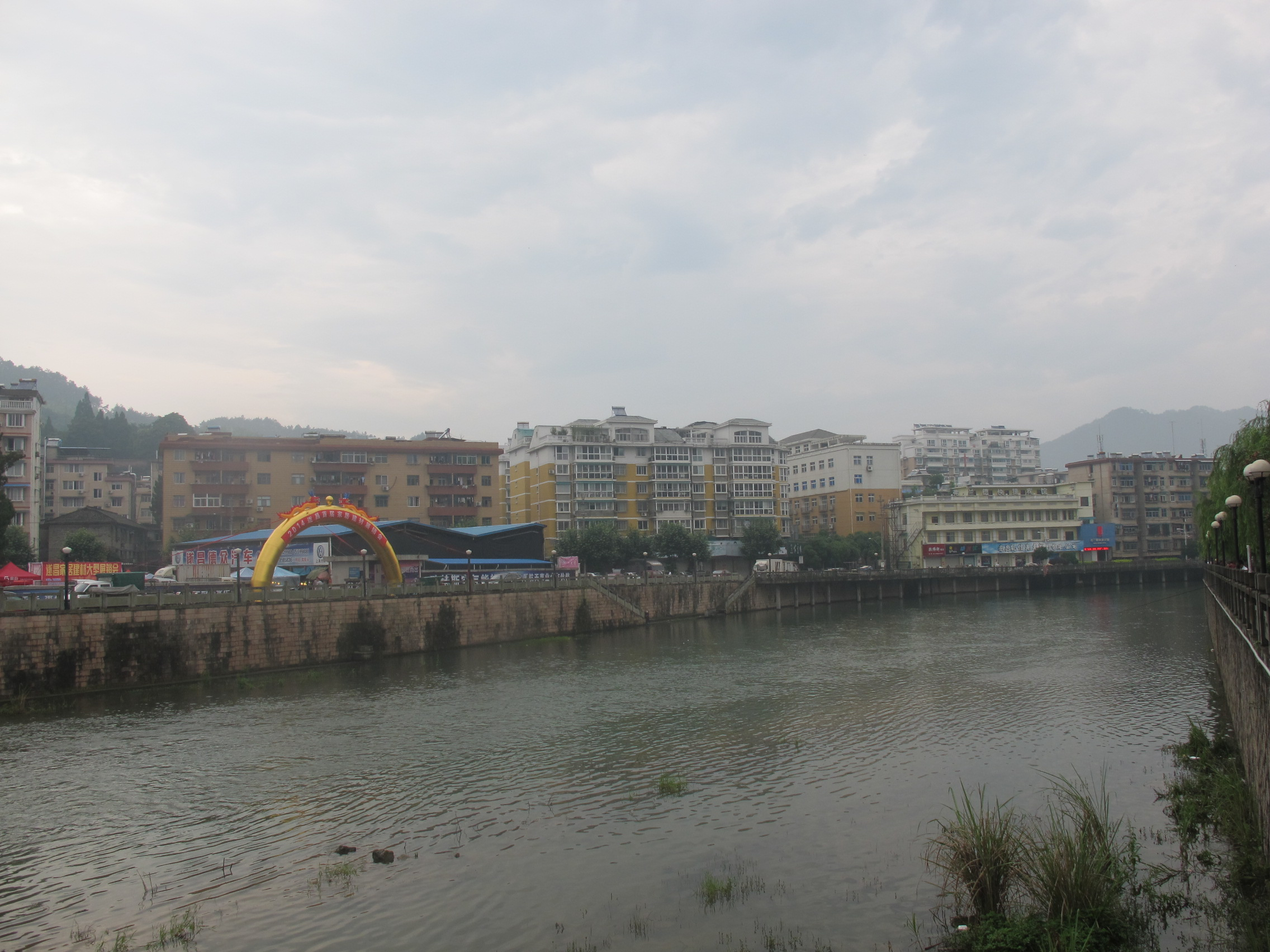

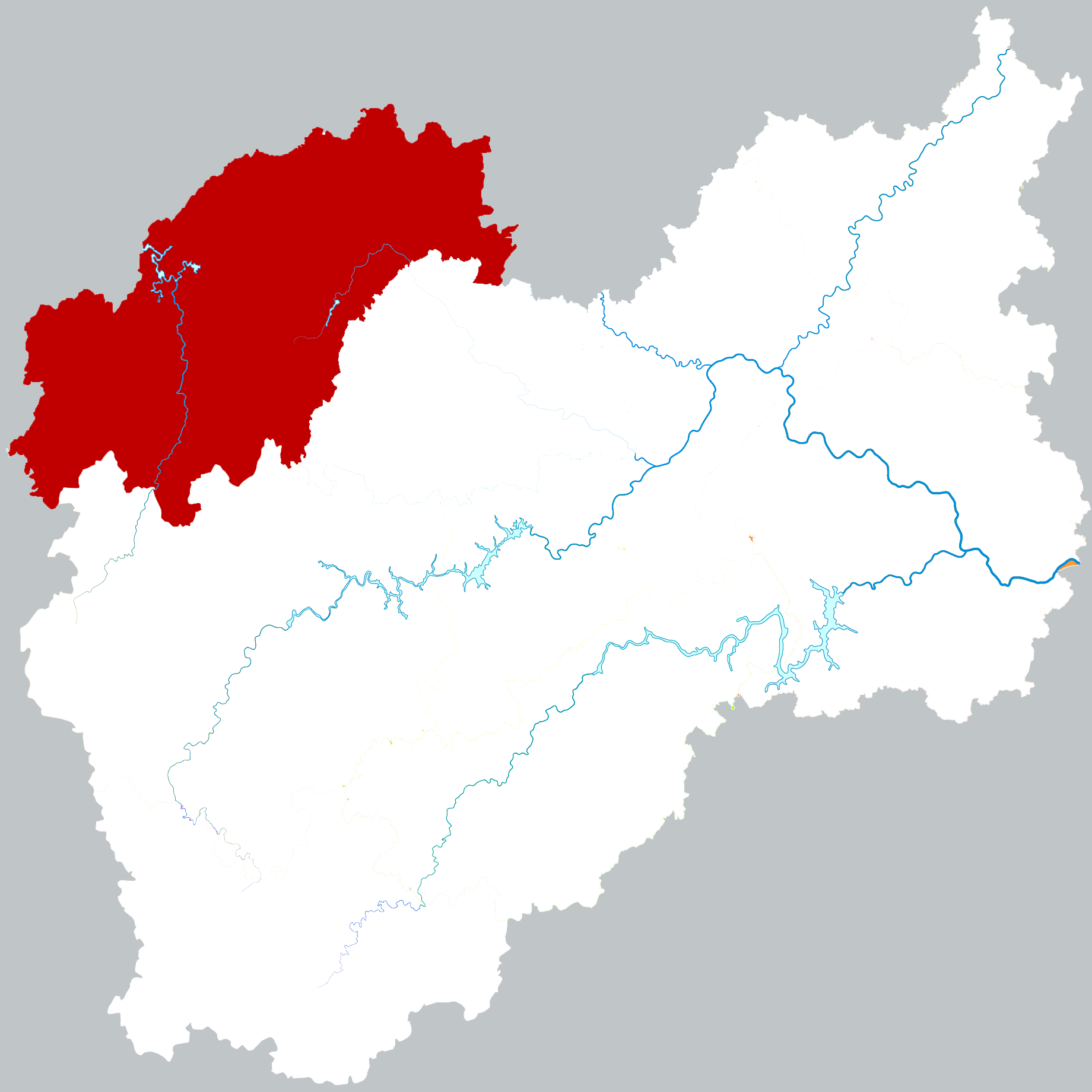
- Location of Suichang County within Lishui

- Location of the seat in Zhejiang
- Coordinates: 28.592°N 119.276°E
- Country: People's Republic of China
- Province: Zhejiang
- Prefecture-level city: Lishui

Area
  - Total: 2,539.56 km^{2} (980.53 sq mi)

Population (2022)
  - Total: 194,400
  - Density: 76.55/km^{2} (198.3/sq mi)
- Time zone: UTC+8 (China Standard)
- Website: www.suichang.gov.cn

Suichang County (Chinese: 遂昌县; pinyin: Suíchāng Xiàn) is a county under the jurisdiction of Lishui City, in the southwest of Zhejiang Province, China, bordering Fujian province to the southwest.

== History ==
Suichang is known as the place where Tang Xianzu wrote his most famous play The Peony Pavilion in the 16th century. Tang served as Suichang County's top official for three years and left behind many legendary stories which are still passed on from generation to generation. Today's Suichang County has joined modern society with many vehicles, highways connecting it to the capital city of Hangzhou, and renowned for its bamboo forests and natural scenery such as White Horse Mountain (Bai Ma Shan) and Nine Dragon Mountain (Jiu Long Shan) which recorded as one of the sites where wild humans were said to be present in the 1950s and 1960s.

== Administrative divisions ==
Towns:

- Miaogao (妙高镇), Yunfeng (云峰镇), Beijie (北界镇), Dazhe (大柘镇), Shilian (石练镇), Jinzhu (金竹镇), Huangshayao (黄沙腰镇), Xinluwan (新路湾镇), Wangcunkou (王村口镇)

Townships:

- Jiaotan Township (焦滩乡), Yingcun Township (应村乡), Hushan Township (湖山乡), Lianzhu Township (濂竹乡), Gaoping Township (高坪乡), Caiyuan Township (蔡源乡), Longyang Township (龙洋乡), Xifan Township (西畈乡), Ankou Township (垵口乡), Zhedaikou Township (柘岱口乡), Sanren She Ethnic Township (三仁畲族乡)

== Climate ==
Climate data for Suichang, elevation 238 m (781 ft), (1991–2020 normals, extremes 1981–2010)
Month	Jan	Feb	Mar	Apr	May	Jun	Jul	Aug	Sep	Oct	Nov	Dec	Year
Record high °C (°F)	26.5 (79.7)	29.1 (84.4)	34.9 (94.8)	34.6 (94.3)	37.0 (98.6)	37.0 (98.6)	40.6 (105.1)	40.0 (104.0)	39.7 (103.5)	36.0 (96.8)	33.2 (91.8)	26.1 (79.0)	40.6 (105.1)
Mean daily maximum °C (°F)	11.3 (52.3)	14.0 (57.2)	17.7 (63.9)	23.5 (74.3)	27.6 (81.7)	29.7 (85.5)	34.0 (93.2)	33.4 (92.1)	29.6 (85.3)	24.9 (76.8)	19.4 (66.9)	13.8 (56.8)	23.2 (73.8)
Daily mean °C (°F)	6.1 (43.0)	8.3 (46.9)	11.9 (53.4)	17.4 (63.3)	21.9 (71.4)	24.7 (76.5)	27.9 (82.2)	27.4 (81.3)	24.0 (75.2)	18.8 (65.8)	13.4 (56.1)	7.8 (46.0)	17.5 (63.4)
Mean daily minimum °C (°F)	2.7 (36.9)	4.5 (40.1)	7.9 (46.2)	13.0 (55.4)	17.5 (63.5)	21.1 (70.0)	23.4 (74.1)	23.3 (73.9)	20.1 (68.2)	14.5 (58.1)	9.3 (48.7)	3.8 (38.8)	13.4 (56.2)
Record low °C (°F)	−7.7 (18.1)	−6.7 (19.9)	−4.2 (24.4)	−0.2 (31.6)	7.2 (45.0)	11.1 (52.0)	17.9 (64.2)	16.3 (61.3)	10.3 (50.5)	1.3 (34.3)	−3.1 (26.4)	−9.9 (14.2)	−9.9 (14.2)
Average precipitation mm (inches)	77.0 (3.03)	86.3 (3.40)	166.7 (6.56)	182.4 (7.18)	183.6 (7.23)	317.4 (12.50)	167.3 (6.59)	157.6 (6.20)	108.4 (4.27)	51.3 (2.02)	76.7 (3.02)	61.4 (2.42)	1,636.1 (64.42)
Average precipitation days (≥ 0.1 mm)	13.1	13.3	17.8	16.9	17.4	18.9	14.6	15.9	11.9	7.4	9.9	9.9	167
Average snowy days	2.4	1.8	0.5	0	0	0	0	0	0	0	0	0.8	5.5
Average relative humidity (%)	78	77	77	76	76	81	76	77	77	75	78	76	77
Mean monthly sunshine hours	93.1	92.0	101.8	119.1	131.4	109.8	202.9	188.3	150.1	150.8	120.6	121.0	1,580.9
Percentage possible sunshine	28	29	27	31	31	26	48	46	41	43	38	38	36
Source: China Meteorological Administration
