= Red braised pork belly =

Chinese braised pork dish

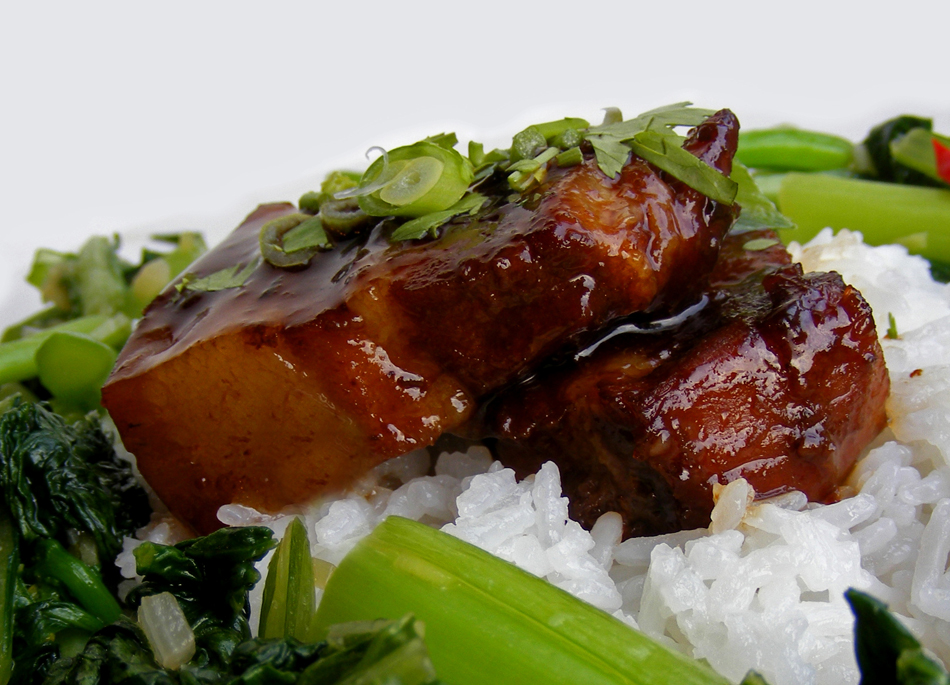
- Alternative names: Hong shao rou
- Course: Main course
- Place of origin: China
- Region or state: Hunan
- Associated cuisine: Hunan, Shanghai
- Main ingredients: Pork
- Ingredients generally used: Ginger, garlic, aromatic spices, chilies, sugar, star anise, light and dark soy sauce, rice wine
- Similar dishes: Humba

Red braised pork belly, or hong shao rou (simplified Chinese: 红烧肉; traditional Chinese: 紅燒肉; pinyin: hóngshāoròu), is a classic pork dish from China, red-cooked using pork belly and a combination of ginger, garlic, aromatic spices, chilis, sugar, star anise, light and dark soy sauce, and rice wine. The dish has a melt-in-the-mouth texture that is formed as a result of a long braising process, during which the liquid reduces and becomes thick. It is generally served with steamed rice and dark green vegetables, often over holidays. The dish is often prepared with hard-boiled chicken eggs or vegetables, which are used to soak up the juices from the recipe.

== Variations ==
Many Chinese provinces have slightly different variations, but the Hunanese version, often called "Mao's family style red braised pork" (毛氏红烧肉; Máo shì hóngshāoròu), is often said to have been one of Mao Zedong's favorite dishes, and is served at the many Hunan restaurants across China specializing in so called "Mao-style cuisine". The popularity of the dish has led the Hunan provincial government to codify the recipe of the dish, in particular deciding that only meat of the celebrated Ningxiang breed of pig should be used in authentic hong shao rou.

The Shanghai-style hong shao rou (上海红烧肉; Shànghǎi hóngshāoròu) is another well-known variation, characterized by a sweeter and glossier sauce due to a higher proportion of rock sugar and a more liberal use of Shaoxing wine.

== Gallery ==
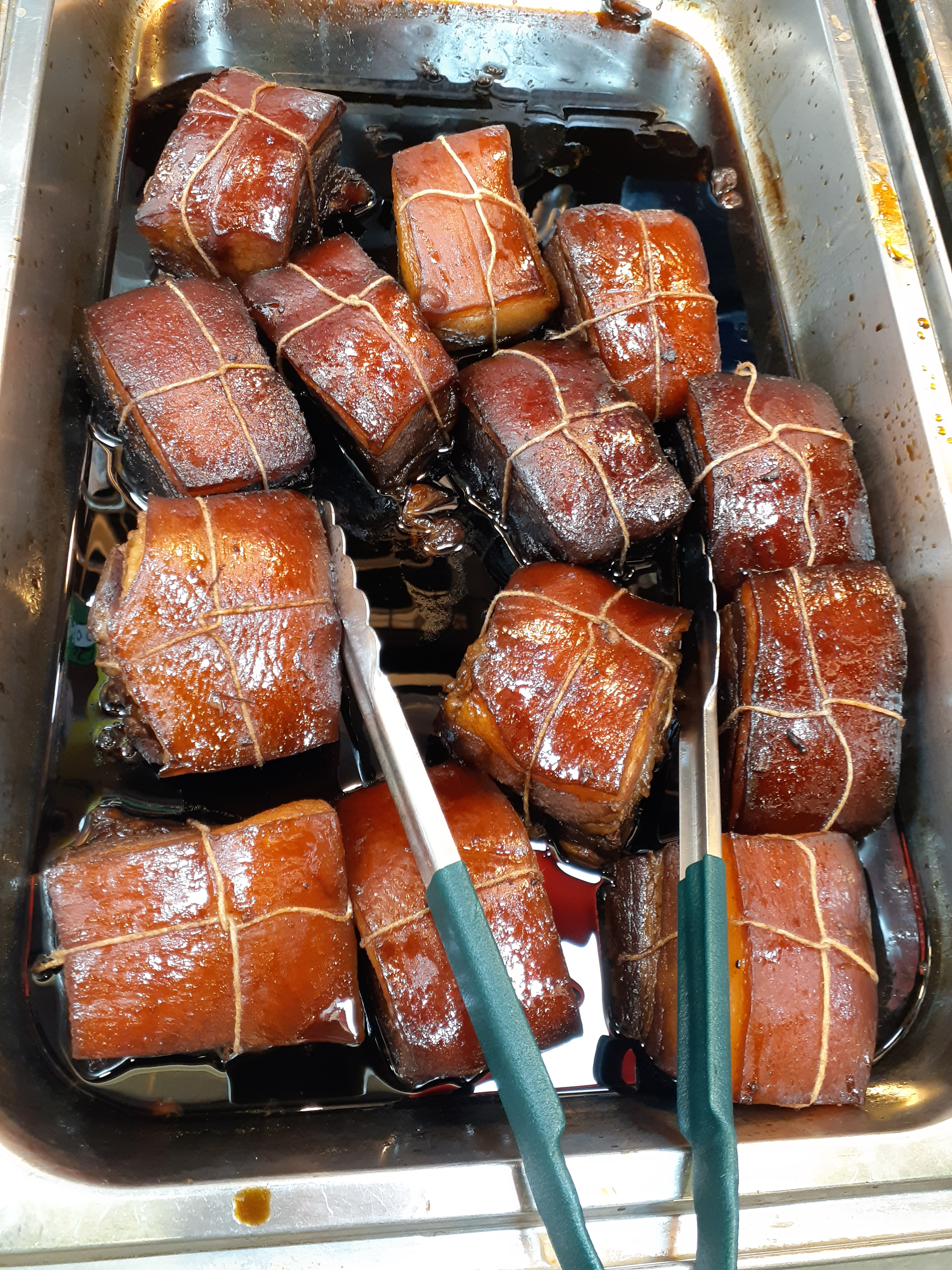

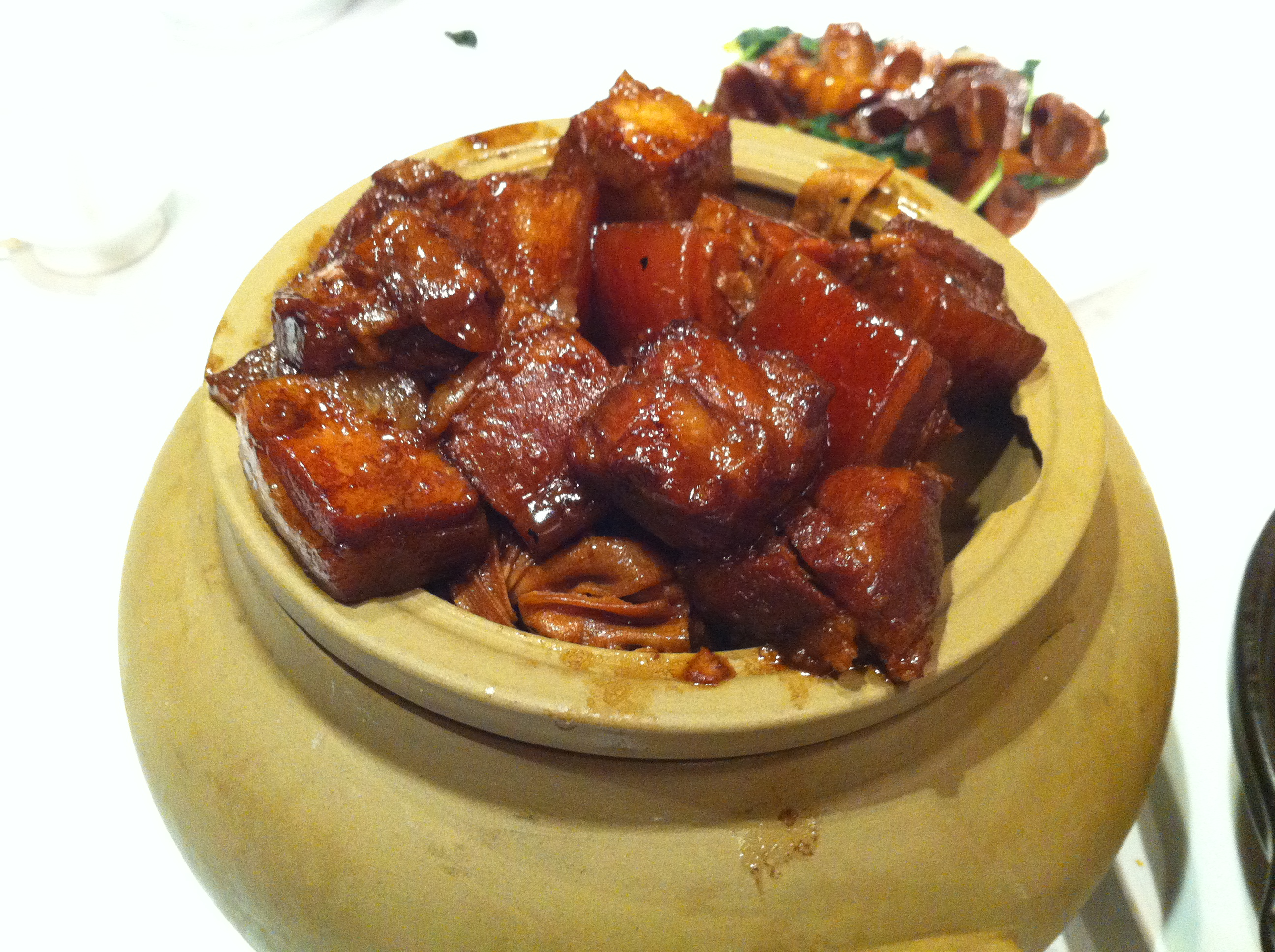

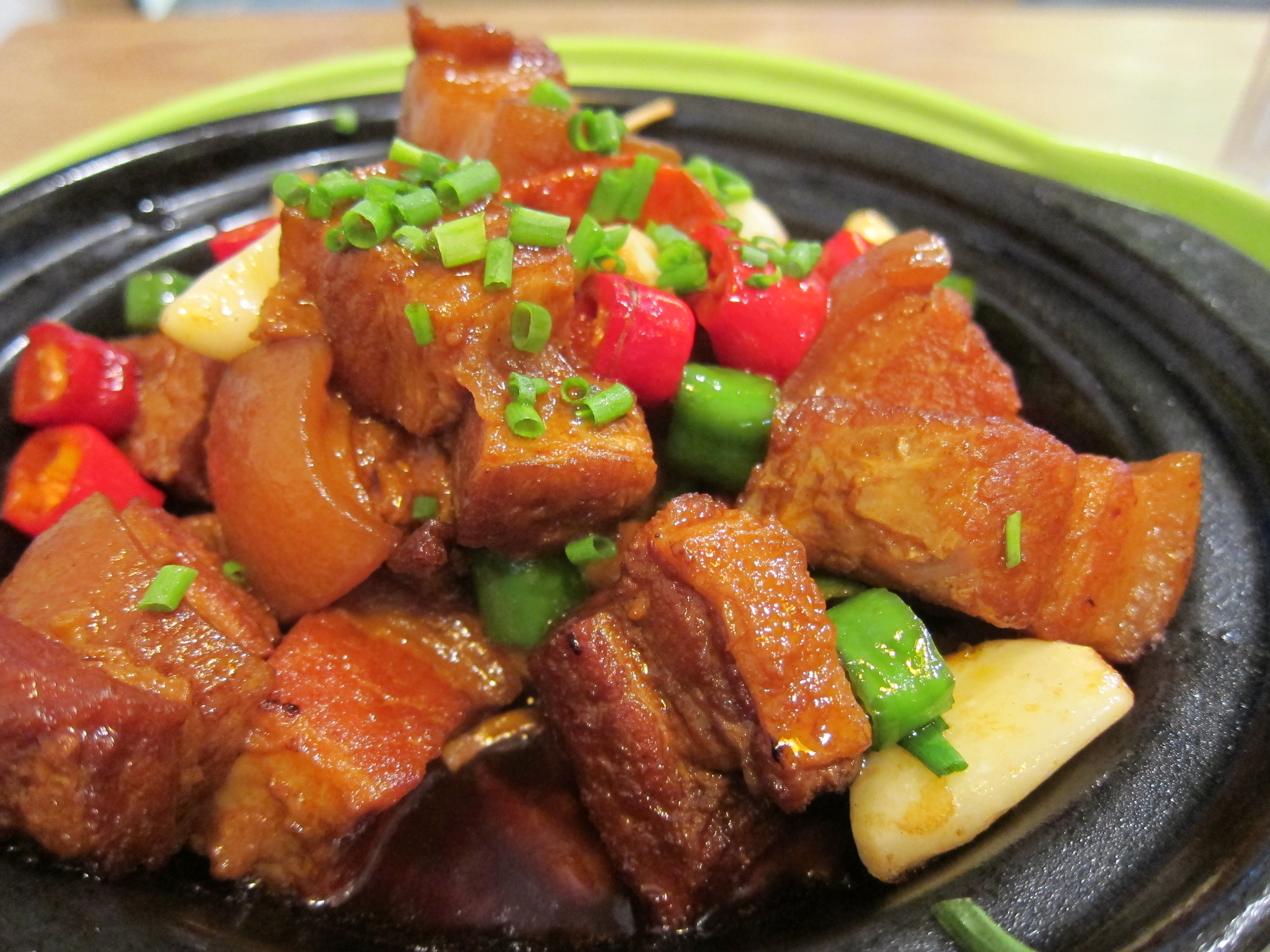

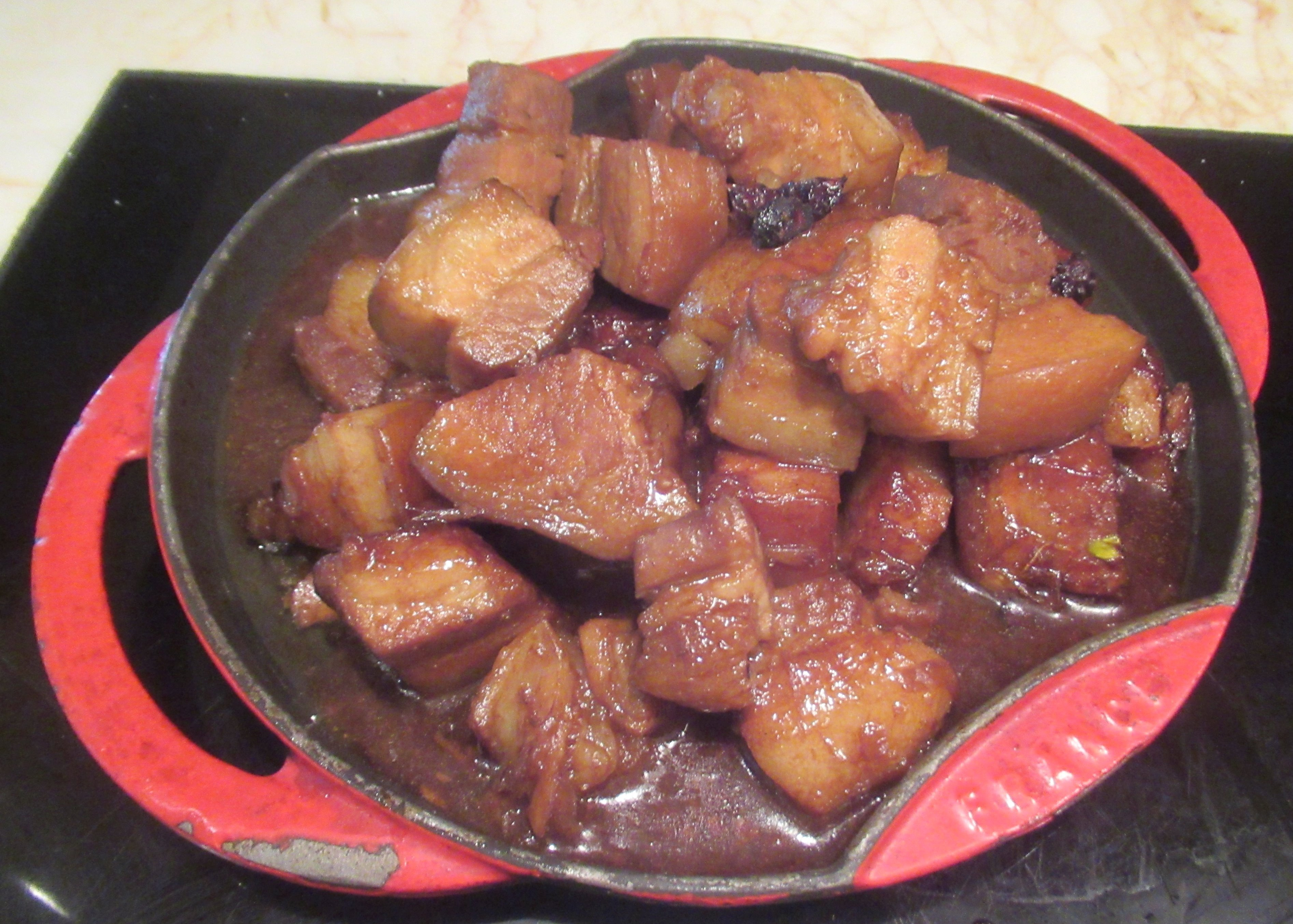

== See also ==
- List of pork dishes
- Dongpo pork
- Red cooking
