= Xiangfen County =

Coordinates: 35°52′35″N 111°26′31″E

Xiangfen County 襄汾县 Hsiangfen
- County
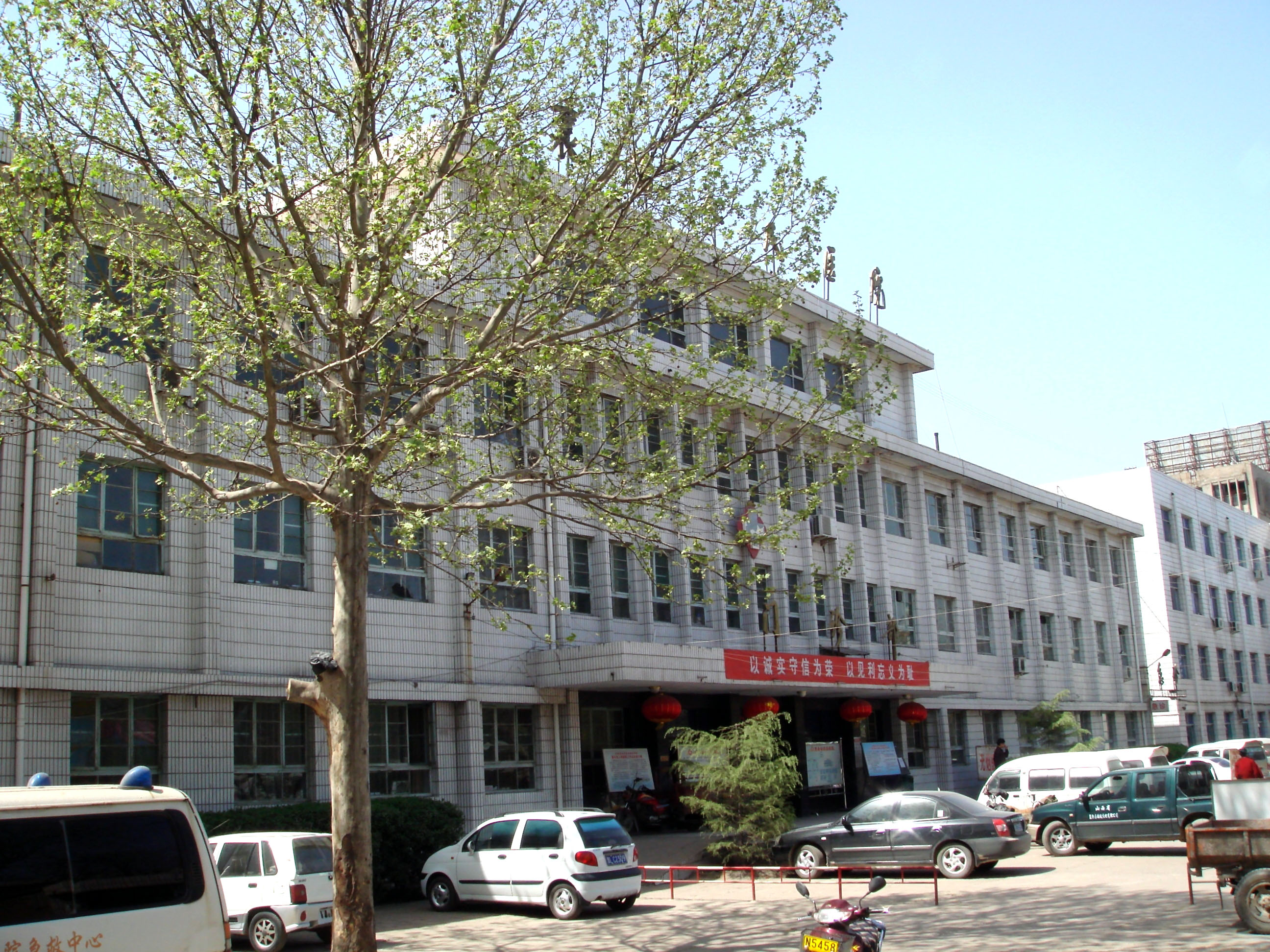
- People's Hospital

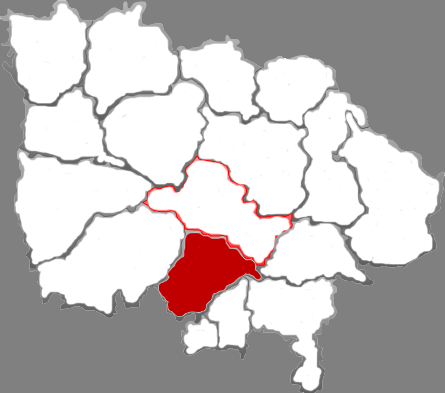
- Xiangfen in Linfen

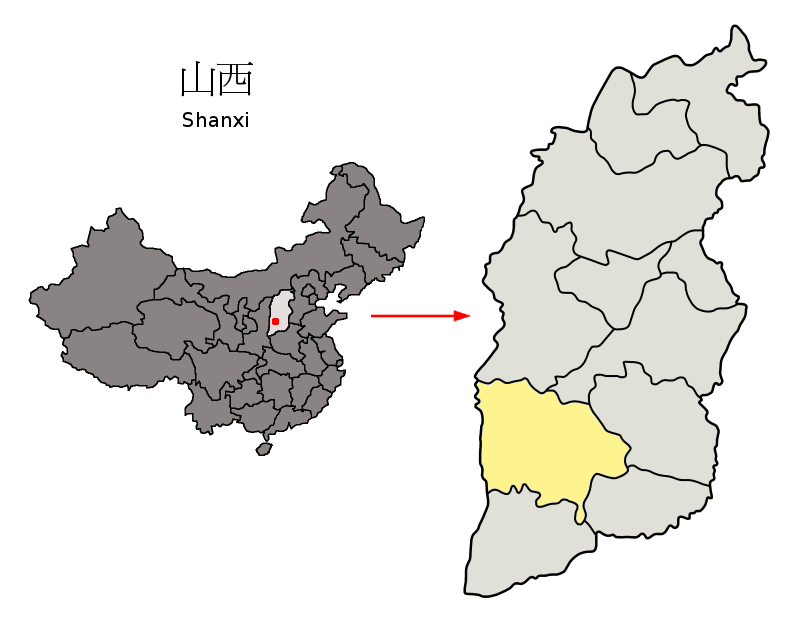
- Linfen in Shanxi
- Country: China
- Province: Shanxi
- Prefecture-level city: Linfen
- County seat: Xincheng (新城镇)

Area
  - Total: 1,034 km^{2} (399 sq mi)

Population (2010)
  - Total: 442,614
  - Density: 428.1/km^{2} (1,109/sq mi)
- Time zone: UTC+8 (China Standard)
- Postal code: 041500
- Area code: 0357
- Website: www.xiangfen.gov.cn

Xiangfen County (simplified Chinese: 襄汾县; traditional Chinese: 襄汾縣; pinyin: Xiāngfén Xiàn) is a county in the southwest of Shanxi Province, China. It was established in February 1954 from the merger of the former Xiangling County (襄陵县) and Fencheng County (汾城县). The county falls under the jurisdiction of the prefecture-level city of Linfen, and has an area of 1,034 km^{2} (399 sq mi) with 442,614 inhabitants.

Taosi archeological site is in Xiangfen County.

== Administrative divisions ==
Xiangfen County has jurisdiction over seven towns and six townships. These towns and townships are then further divided into 6 neighborhood committees, and 348 village committees.

The county's seven towns are Xincheng, Zhaokang, Fencheng, Nanjia, Gucheng, Xiangling, and Dengzhuang.

The county's six townships are Taosi Township, Yonggu Township, Jingmao Township, Xijia Township, Nanxindian Township, and Dadeng Township.

== Climate ==
Climate data for Xiangfen, elevation 464 m (1,522 ft), (1991–2020 normals, extremes 1981–2010)
Month	Jan	Feb	Mar	Apr	May	Jun	Jul	Aug	Sep	Oct	Nov	Dec	Year
Record high °C (°F)	13.8 (56.8)	21.8 (71.2)	29.7 (85.5)	35.8 (96.4)	38.2 (100.8)	39.5 (103.1)	40.9 (105.6)	39.7 (103.5)	38.5 (101.3)	31.3 (88.3)	24.1 (75.4)	15.1 (59.2)	40.9 (105.6)
Mean daily maximum °C (°F)	4.7 (40.5)	9.4 (48.9)	16.0 (60.8)	22.8 (73.0)	27.7 (81.9)	32.1 (89.8)	32.7 (90.9)	30.8 (87.4)	26.1 (79.0)	20.0 (68.0)	12.3 (54.1)	5.8 (42.4)	20.0 (68.1)
Daily mean °C (°F)	−2.0 (28.4)	2.4 (36.3)	8.7 (47.7)	15.3 (59.5)	20.5 (68.9)	25.1 (77.2)	26.7 (80.1)	24.9 (76.8)	19.8 (67.6)	13.2 (55.8)	5.6 (42.1)	−0.6 (30.9)	13.3 (55.9)
Mean daily minimum °C (°F)	−6.9 (19.6)	−3.0 (26.6)	2.6 (36.7)	8.5 (47.3)	13.5 (56.3)	18.5 (65.3)	21.5 (70.7)	20.2 (68.4)	14.9 (58.8)	8.1 (46.6)	0.8 (33.4)	−5.2 (22.6)	7.8 (46.0)
Record low °C (°F)	−19.8 (−3.6)	−22.0 (−7.6)	−11.0 (12.2)	−4.1 (24.6)	0.4 (32.7)	7.8 (46.0)	13.1 (55.6)	12.2 (54.0)	2.6 (36.7)	−5.2 (22.6)	−14.7 (5.5)	−18.5 (−1.3)	−22.0 (−7.6)
Average precipitation mm (inches)	4.7 (0.19)	7.3 (0.29)	10.7 (0.42)	30.2 (1.19)	41.1 (1.62)	58.0 (2.28)	112.3 (4.42)	91.1 (3.59)	69.3 (2.73)	41.0 (1.61)	17.1 (0.67)	3.4 (0.13)	486.2 (19.14)
Average precipitation days (≥ 0.1 mm)	2.4	3.0	4.1	5.8	7.5	8.3	10.0	8.8	9.3	6.4	4.6	2.2	72.4
Average snowy days	3.3	3.0	1.0	0.2	0	0	0	0	0	0	1.1	2.3	10.9
Average relative humidity (%)	57	55	51	52	55	56	68	73	73	71	67	60	62
Mean monthly sunshine hours	137.2	145.6	183.9	209.8	229.0	210.6	200.7	187.9	156.7	154.6	137.8	138.1	2,091.9
Percentage possible sunshine	44	47	49	53	52	48	46	45	43	45	45	46	47
Source: China Meteorological Administration

== Economy ==
The county has vast mineral deposits, including 2.8 billion tons of proven coal reserves, 371 million tons of gypsum, and 30 million tons of iron ore. Other mined resources include dolomite, gold, silver, and copper.

The county's heavy industries produce a number of industrial resources, such as coal coke, chemicals, steel, cement, and cast iron. Other more complex goods such as auto parts, fitness equipment, and industrial sewing machines are also produced in Xiangfen County.

== Transportation ==
=== Road ===
The G5 Beijing–Kunming Expressway and the G22 Qingdao–Lanzhou Expressway run through the county.

=== Rail ===
The Datong–Puzhou railway and the Datong–Xi'an passenger railway run through the county.

== See also ==
- Dingcun, Xincheng
- 1695 Linfen earthquake
