= Cooking banana =

Banana commonly used in cooking

Cooking bananas
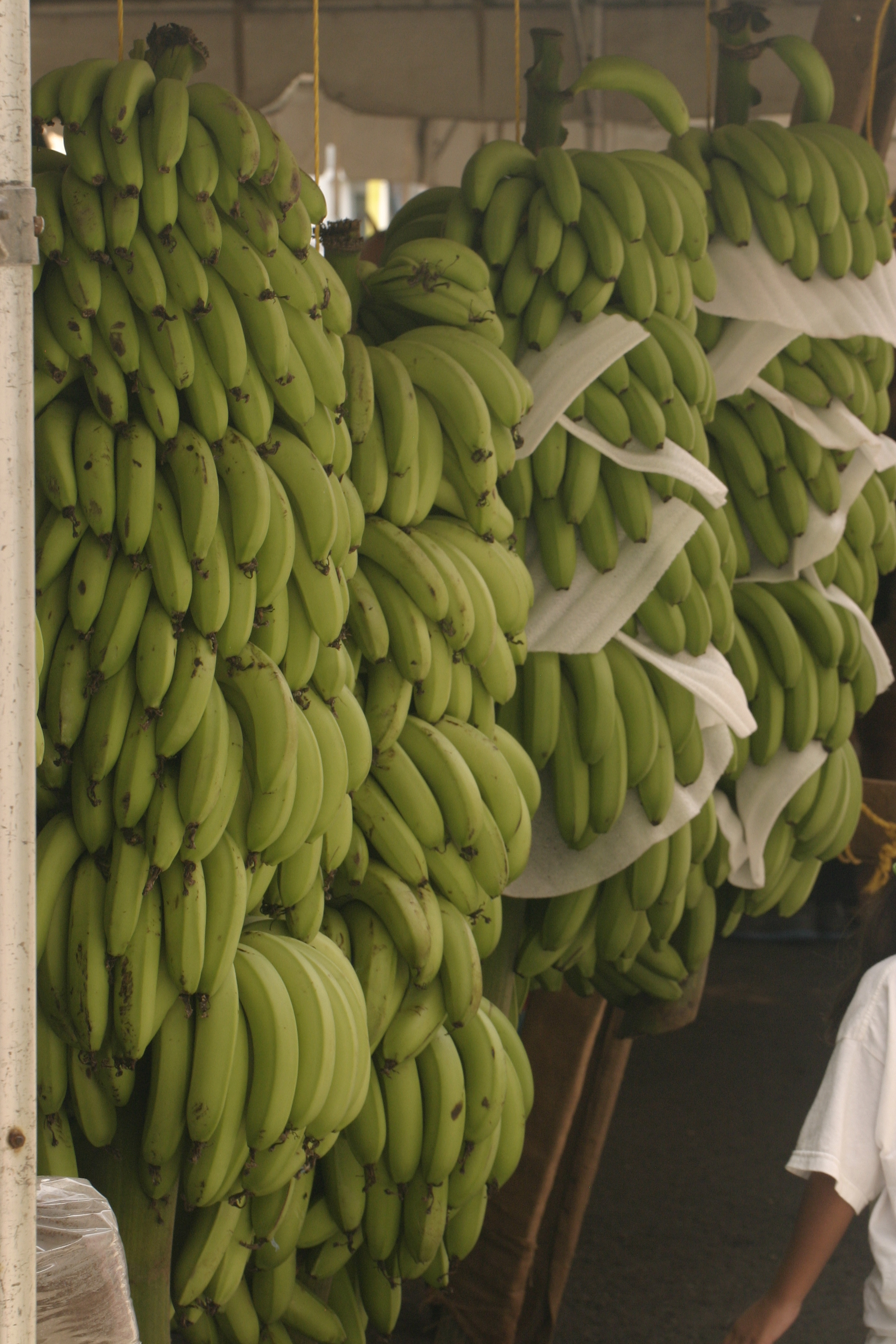
- Large bunch of green bananas
- Genus: Musa
- Species: Musa × paradisiaca
- Hybrid parentage: M. acuminata × M. balbisiana
- Cultivar group: Cultivars from a number of groups, including the AAA Group, the AAB Group and the ABB Group
- Origin: Southeast Asia

Cooking bananas are a group of banana cultivars in the genus Musa whose fruits are generally used in cooking. They are not eaten raw and are generally starchy. Many cooking bananas are referred to as plantains or green bananas. In botanical usage, the term plantain is used only for true plantains, while other starchy cultivars used for cooking are called cooking bananas. True plantains are cooking cultivars belonging to the AAB group, while cooking bananas are any cooking cultivar belonging to the AAB, AAA, ABB, or BBB groups. The currently accepted scientific name for all such cultivars in these groups is Musa × paradisiaca. Fe'i bananas (Musa × troglodytarum) from the Pacific Islands are often eaten roasted or boiled, and are thus informally referred to as mountain plantains, although they do not belong to any of the species from which all modern banana cultivars are descended.

Cooking bananas are a major food staple in West and Central Africa, the Caribbean islands, Central America, and northern South America. Members of the genus Musa are indigenous to the tropical regions of Southeast Asia and Oceania. Bananas fruit all year round, making them a reliable all-season staple food.

Cooking bananas are treated as a starchy fruit with a relatively neutral flavor and soft texture when cooked. Cooking bananas may be eaten raw; however, they are most commonly prepared either fried, boiled, or processed into flour or dough.

== Description ==
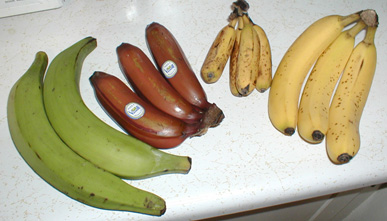
From left to right: plantain, red banana, apple banana, and Cavendish banana

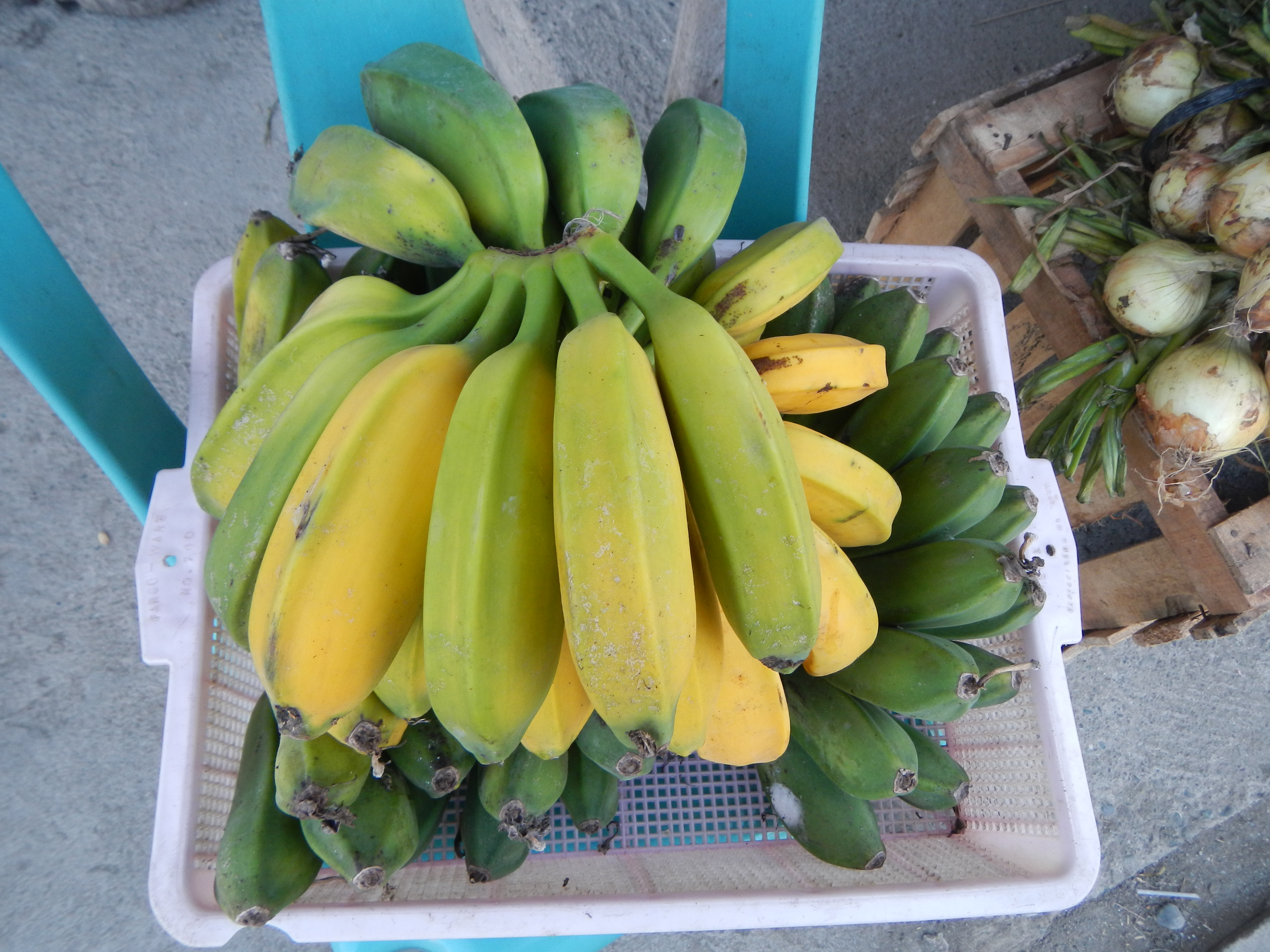
Saba bananas – Musa 'Saba' (ABB Group)

Plantains have more starch and less sugar compared to regular bananas, which is why they are mostly cooked before eating. They are typically boiled or fried when eaten green, and when processed, they can be made into flour and turned into baked products such as cakes, bread and pancakes. Green plantains can also be boiled and pureed and then used as thickeners for soups. The pulp of green plantain is typically hard, with the peel often so stiff that it must be cut with a knife to be removed.

Mature, yellow plantains can be peeled like typical dessert bananas; the pulp is softer than in immature, green fruit and some of the starch has been converted to sugar. They can be eaten raw, but are not as flavorful as dessert bananas, so are usually cooked. When yellow plantains are fried, they tend to caramelize, turning a golden-brown color. They can also be boiled, baked, microwaved, or grilled over charcoal, either peeled or unpeeled.

Plantains are a staple food in the tropical regions of the world, ranking as the tenth most important staple food in the world. As a staple, plantains are treated in much the same way as potatoes, with a similar neutral flavor and texture when the unripe fruit is cooked by steaming, boiling, or frying.

Since they fruit all year, plantains are a reliable staple food, particularly in developing countries with inadequate food storage, preservation, and transportation technologies. In Africa, plantains and bananas provide more than 25 percent of the caloric requirements for over 70 million people. Plantain plantations are vulnerable to destruction by hurricanes, because Musa spp. do not withstand high winds well.

An average plantain provides about 920 kilojoules (220 kilocalories) of food energy and is a good source of potassium and dietary fiber. The sap from the fruit peel, as well as the entire plant, can stain clothing and hands, and can be difficult to remove.

== Production ==
Production of plantains

Plantain yield

Yearly per capita supply of plantains

== Taxonomy ==
Carl Linnaeus originally classified bananas into two species based only on their uses as food: Musa paradisiaca for plantains and Musa sapientum for dessert bananas. Both are now known to be hybrids between the species Musa acuminata (A genome) and Musa balbisiana (B genome). The earlier published name, Musa × paradisiaca, is now used as the scientific name for all such hybrids. Most modern plantains are sterile triploids belonging to the AAB Group, sometimes known as the "Plantain group". Other economically important cooking banana groups include the East African Highland bananas (Mutika/Lujugira subgroup) of the AAA Group and the Pacific plantains (including the Popoulo, Maoli, and Iholena subgroups), also of the AAB Group.

== Dishes ==
=== Fried ===
Pisang goreng ("fried banana" in Indonesian and Malay) is a plantain snack deep-fried in coconut oil. Pisang goreng can be coated in batter flour or fried without batter. It is a snack food mostly found in Indonesia, Malaysia, Singapore and Brunei.

Ethakka appam, pazham (banana) boli or pazham pori are terms used for fried plantain in the state of Kerala, India. The plantain is usually dipped in sweetened rice and white flour batter and then fried in coconut or vegetable oil, similar to pisang goreng. It is also known as bajji in Southern Indian states, where it is typically served as a savory fast food.

Aritikaya kura, or vepudu are terms used for deep fried or cooked plantain dish in the state of Andhra Pradesh, India. Plantain is known as Raw Banana or Aritikaya in this part of southern India. It is usually served with steamed white rice and maybe accompanied with plain curd or yogurt. It is usually a favourite dish to be served in weddings and other occasions.

In the Philippines, fried bananas are also served with arroz a la cubana and is frequently characterized as one of its defining ingredients.

Plantains are used in the Ivory Coast dish aloco as the main ingredient. Fried plantains are covered in an onion-tomato sauce, often with a grilled fish between the plantains and sauce.

Boli or bole is the term used for roasted plantain in Nigeria. The plantain is usually grilled and served with roasted fish, ground peanuts and a hot palm oil sauce. It is a dish native to the Yoruba people of Western Nigeria. It is popular among the working class as an inexpensive midday meal.

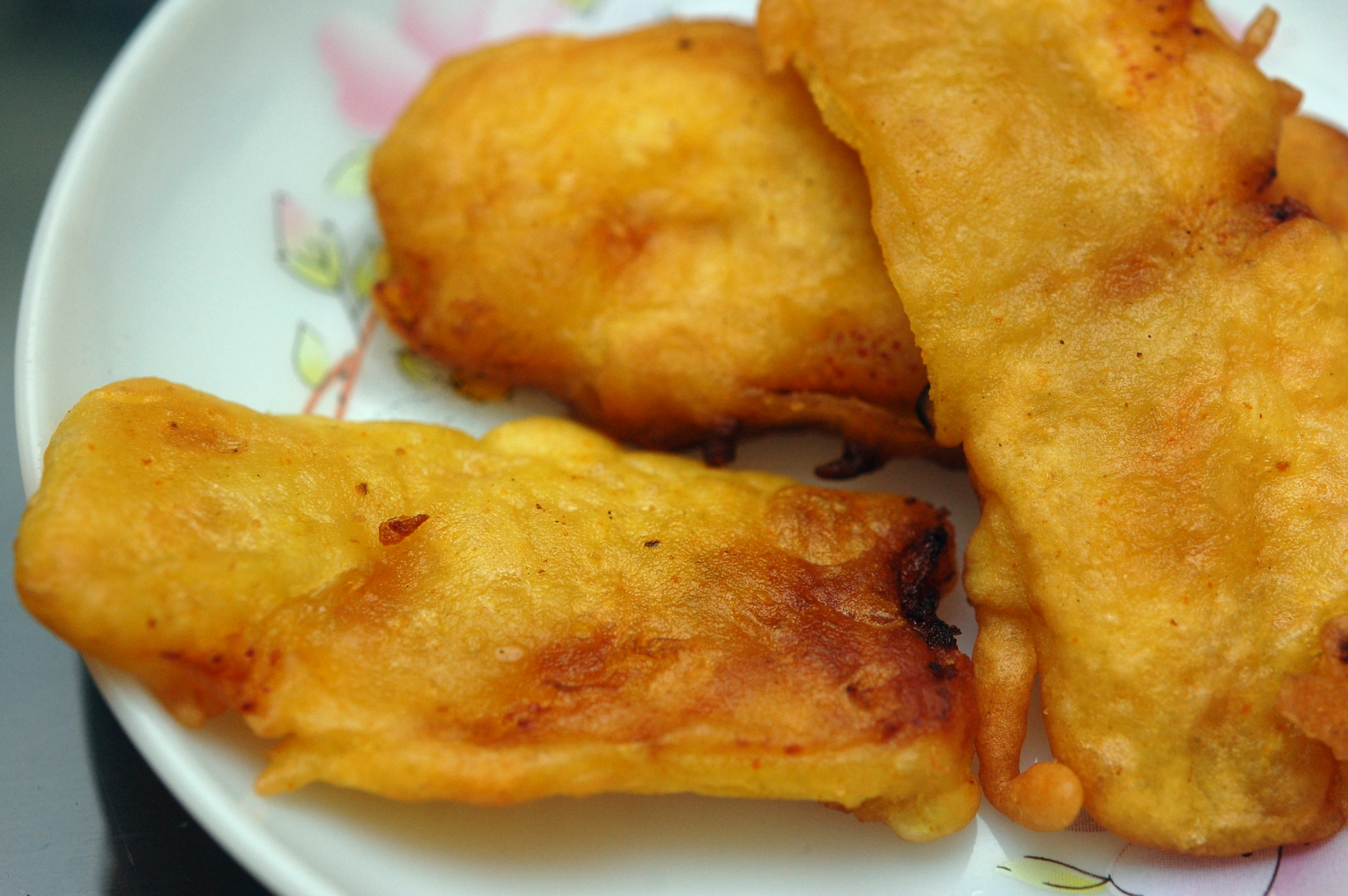
Pazham pori, a plantain dish from south India

Plantain is popular in West and Central Africa, especially Cameroon, Democratic Republic of Congo, Bénin, Ghana and Nigeria; when ripe plantain is fried, it is generally called dodo ("dough-dough"). The ripe plantain is usually sliced diagonally for a large oval shape, then fried in oil to a golden brown color. The diagonal slice maximizes the surface area, allowing the plantain to cook evenly. Fried plantain can be eaten as such, or served with stew or sauce. In Ikire, a town in Osun State in southwestern Nigeria, there is a special way of preparing fried plantain known as Dodo Ikire. This variation of Dodo (Fried Plantain) is made from overripe plantain, chopped into small pieces, sprinkled with chili pepper and then fried in boiling point palm oil until the pieces turn blackish. The fried plantains are then stuffed carefully into a plastic funnel and then pressed using a wooden pestle to compress and acquire a conical shape when removed.

In Ghana, the dish is called kelewele and can be found as a snack sold by street vendors. Though sweeter and spicier variations exist, kelewele is often flavored with nutmeg, chili powder, ginger and salt.

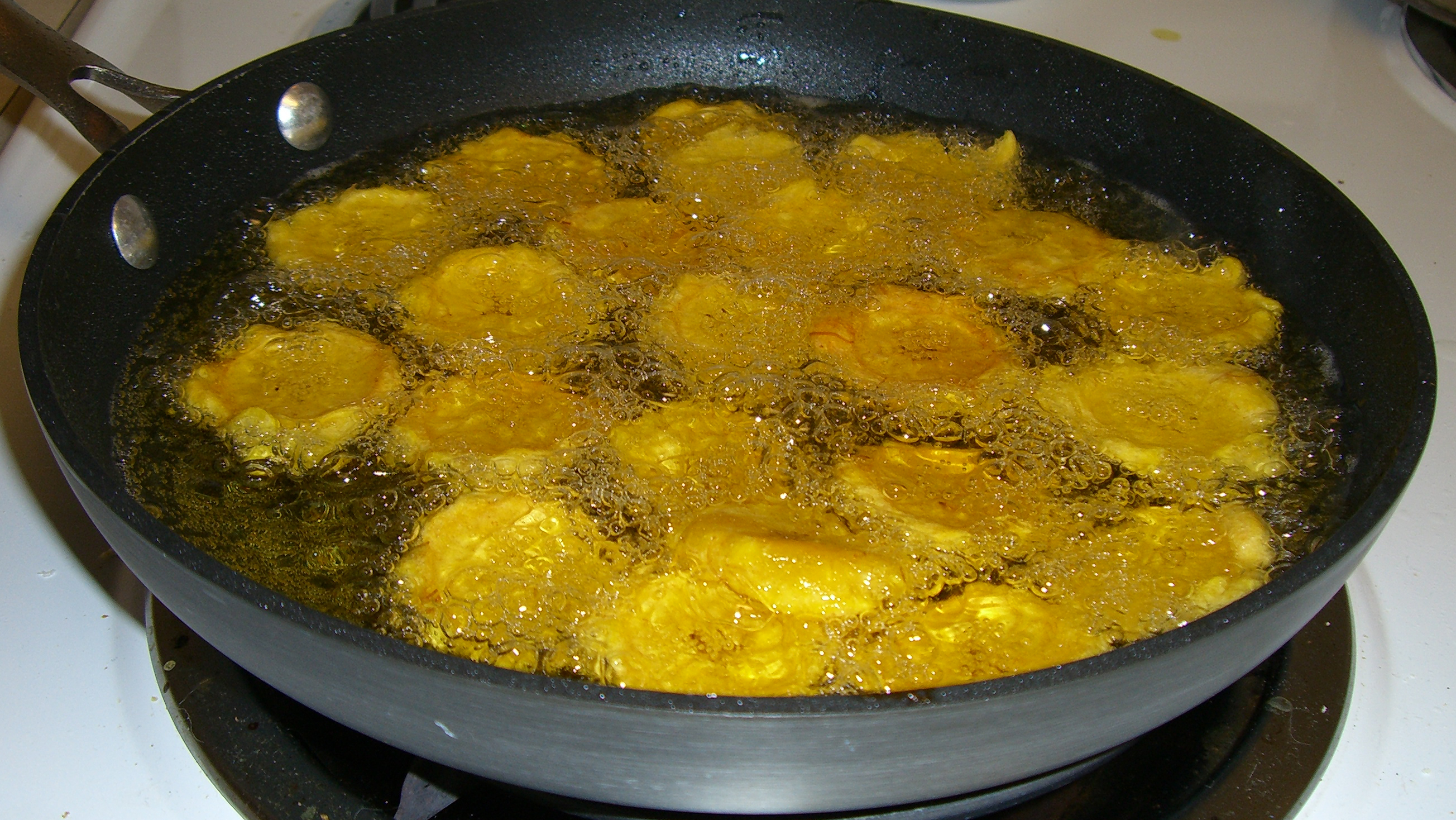
Tostones being fried for the second time

In the Western hemisphere, tostones (also known as banann peze in Haiti, tachinos or chatinos in Cuba, and patacones in Colombia, Costa Rica, Ecuador, Honduras, Panama, Peru and Venezuela) are twice-fried plantain fritters, often served as a side dish, appetizer or snack. Plantains are sliced in 4 cm (2 in) long pieces and fried in oil. The segments are then removed and individually smashed down to about half their original height. Finally, the pieces are fried again and then seasoned, often with salt. In some countries, such as Cuba, Puerto Rico and the Dominican Republic, the tostones are dipped in Creole sauce from chicken, pork, beef, or shrimp before eating. In Haiti, bannann peze is commonly served with pikliz, a slaw-like condiment made with cabbage, onions, carrots and scotch bonnet peppers. In Nicaragua, tostones are typically served with fried cheese (Tostones con queso) and sometimes with refried beans. While the name tostones is used to describe this food when prepared at home, in some South American countries the word also describes plantain chips, which are typically purchased from a store.

In western Venezuela, much of Colombia and the Peruvian Amazon, patacones are a frequently seen variation of tostones. Plantains are sliced in long pieces and fried in oil, then used to make sandwiches with pork, beef, chicken, vegetables and ketchup. They can be made with unripe patacon verde or ripe patacon amarillo plantains.

Chifles is the Spanish term used in Peru and Ecuador for fried green plantains sliced 1–2 mm (1/32–3/32 in) thick; it is also used to describe plantain chips which are sliced thinner. In Nicaragua, they are called "tajadas" and are sliced thinly the long way. They are commonly served alongside many dishes, including fritanga, and sold in bags by themselves.

In Honduras, Venezuela and Central Colombia, fried ripened plantain slices are known as tajadas. They are customary in most typical meals, such as the Venezuelan pabellón criollo. The host or waiter may also offer them as barandas (guard rails), in common slang, as the long slices are typically placed on the sides of a full dish, and therefore look as such. Some variations include adding honey or sugar and frying the slices in butter, to obtain a golden caramel; the result has a sweeter taste and a characteristic pleasant smell. The same slices are known as amarillos and fritos maduros in Puerto Rico, Cuba, and the Dominican Republic respectively. In Panama, tajadas are eaten daily together with steamed rice, meat and beans, thus making up an essential part of the Panamanian diet, as with Honduras. By contrast, in Nicaragua, tajadas are fried unripened plantain slices, and are traditionally served at a fritanga, with fried pork or carne asada, or on their own on green banana leaves, either with a cabbage salad or fresh or fried cheese. In El Salvador, plátanos fritos are ripe plantain slices that are pan-fried and generally served as part of a traditional Salvadoran breakfast.

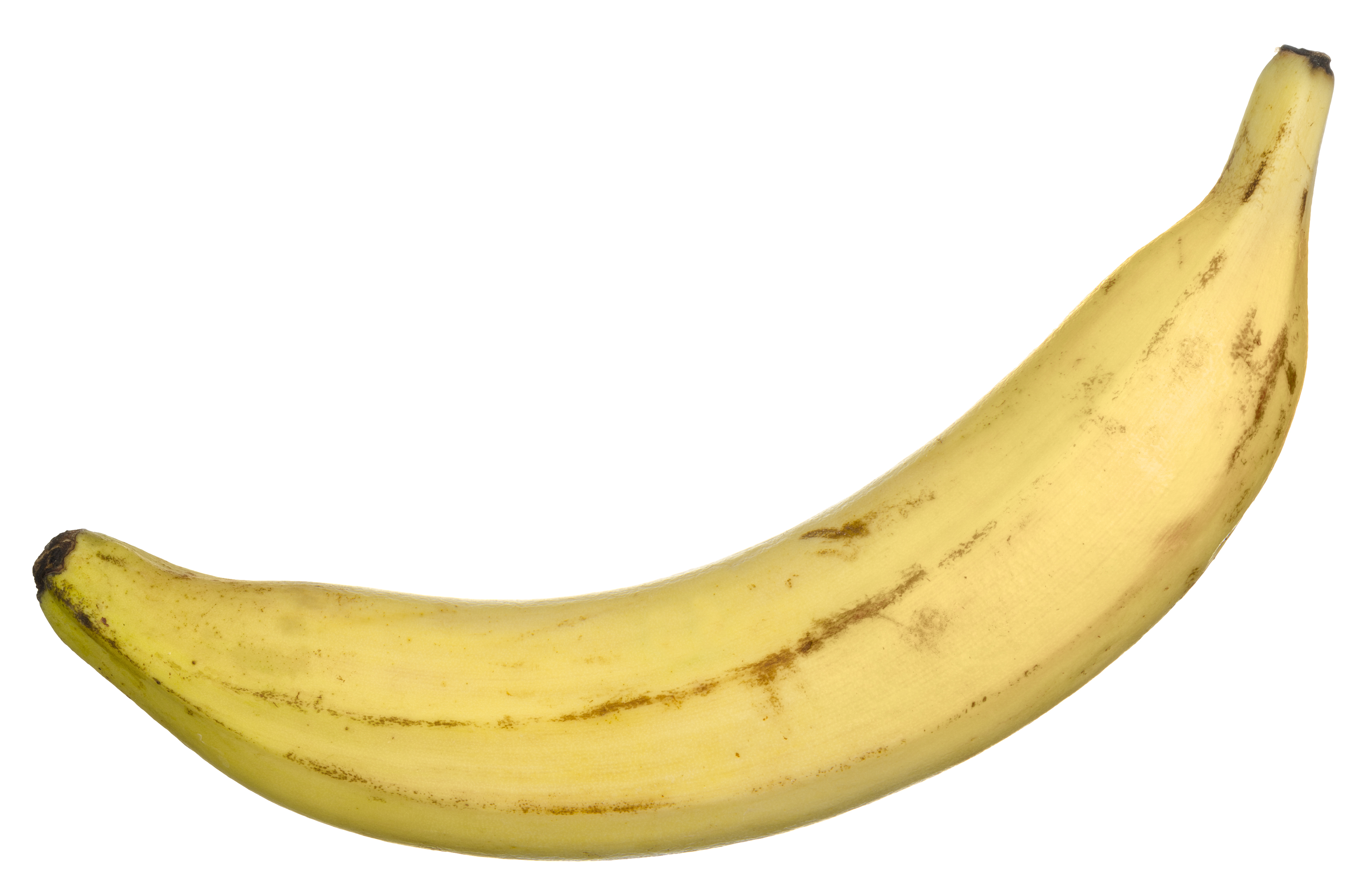
Ripe plantains are used for making maduros (also named amarillos) in Latin American cuisine, in contrast to tostones which are made with starchy unripe plantains.

On Colombia's Caribbean coast, tajadas of fried green plantain are consumed along with grilled meats, and are the dietary equivalent of the French-fried potatoes/chips of Europe and North America.

After removing the skin, maduro can be sliced (between 3 and 20 mm or 1/8–25/32 in thick) and pan-fried in oil until golden brown or according to preference. In the Dominican Republic, Ecuador, Colombia, Honduras (where they are usually eaten with the native sour cream) and Venezuela, they are also eaten baked in the oven (sometimes with cinnamon). In Puerto Rico baked plátanos maduros are usually eaten for breakfast and served with eggs (mainly an omelet with cheese), chorizo or bacon. Only salt is added to green plantains.

Tacacho is a roasted plantain Amazonian cuisine dish from Peru. It is usually served con cecina, with bits of pork.

In Venezuela, a yo-yo is a traditional dish made of two short slices of fried ripened plantain (see Tajada) placed on top of each other, with local soft white cheese in the middle (in a sandwich-like fashion) and held together with toothpicks. The arrangement is dipped in beaten eggs and fried again until the cheese melts and the yo-yo acquires a deep golden hue. They are served as sides or entrees.

In Puerto Rico fried plantains are served in a variety of ways as side dishes, fast foods, and main course. An alternative to tostones are arañitas (little spiders). The name comes from the grated green and yellow plantain pieces forming little legs that stick out of the fritter itself, which ends up looking like a prickly spider on a plate. Alcapurrias are a traditional snack with masa dough made from grated green banana, yautía, seasoned with lard, annatto and stuffed with picadillo. Alcaparrado de plátano have additional grated plantain added to the masa. Mofongo is a beloved dish on the island celebrating a blend of cultures making it one of Puerto Ricos most important dishes. Plantains are fried once and mashed with garlic, fat (butter, lard or olive oil), chicharrón or bacon, and broth it is then formed into a ball and eaten with other meats, soup, vegetables or alone. Puerto Rican piononos are sweet and savory treats made with a combination of fried yellow plantains, cheese, picadillo, and beaten eggs. The result is sweet plantain cups stuffed with a cheese, ground beef and fluffy egg filling. Ralleno de plátano are the sweet plantain verson of papa rellena very popular street food and in cuchifritos.

=== Boiled ===
Eto is a Ghanaian traditional dish made from boiled and mashed yam or plantain and typically savored with boiled eggs, groundnut (peanuts) and sliced avocado. For the plantain option called 'Boodie eto', the plantain can be used unripe, slightly ripe or fully ripe. Culturally, eto was fed to a bride on the day of her marriage, but is now a popular dish enjoyed outside of special occasions as well.

A traditional mangú from the Dominican Republic consists of peeled and boiled green plantains, mashed with hot water to reach a consistency slightly stiffer than mashed potatoes. It is traditionally eaten at breakfast, topped with sautéed red onions in apple cider vinegar and accompanied by fried eggs, fried cheese or fried bologna sausage, known as Dominican salami.

Plantain porridge is also a common dish throughout the Caribbean, in which cooking bananas are boiled with milk, cinnamon, and nutmeg to form a thick porridge typically served at breakfast.

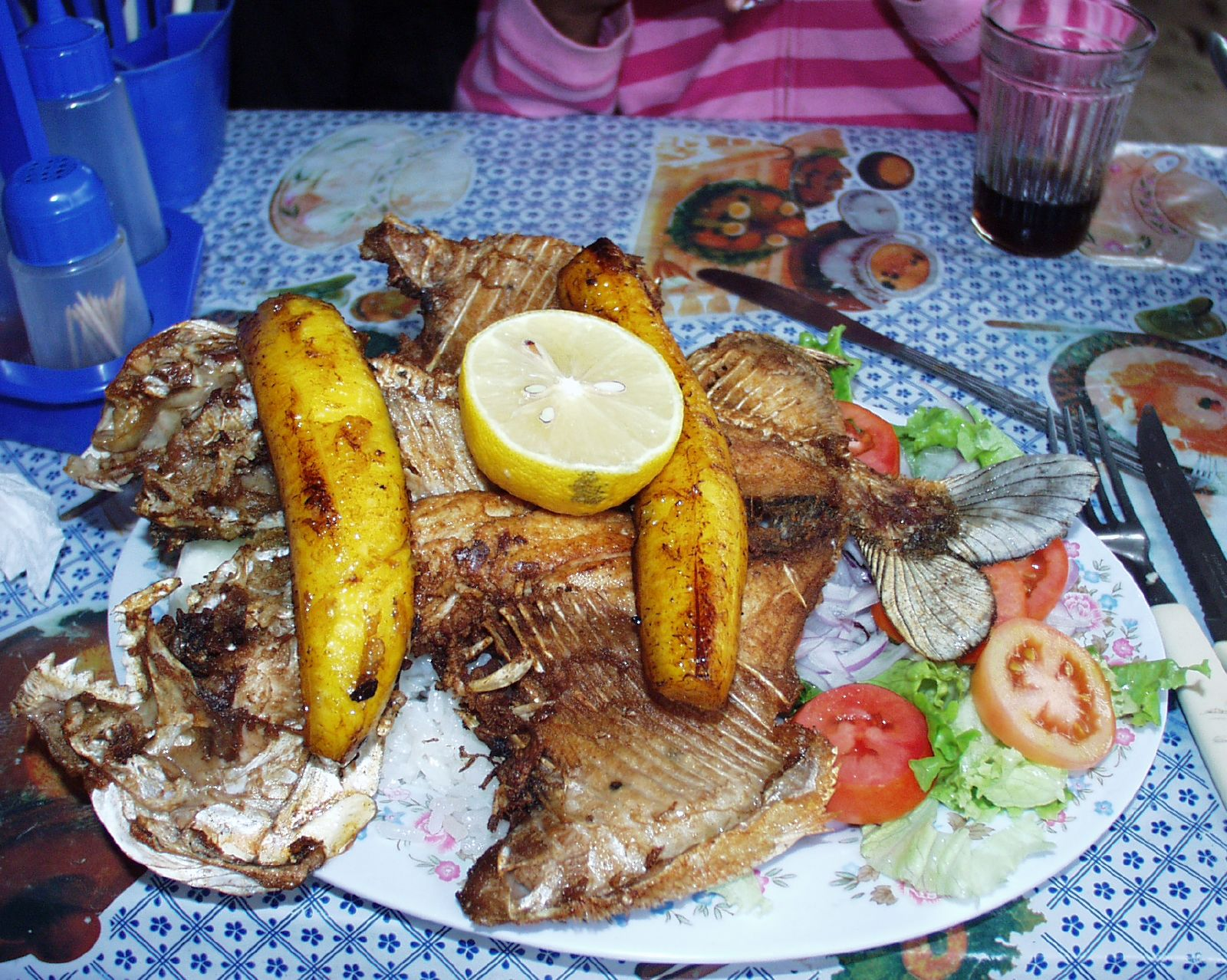
Plantains served over fried pacu (Bolivia)

In Uganda, cooking bananas are referred to as matooke or matoke, which is also the name of a cooking banana stew that is widely prepared in Kenya, Uganda, Tanzania, Rwanda and eastern Congo. The cooking bananas (specifically East African Highland bananas) are peeled, wrapped in the plant's leaves and set in a cooking pot (a sufuria) on the stalks that have been removed from the leaves. The pot is then placed on a charcoal fire and the matoke is steamed for a few hours. While uncooked, the matoke is white and fairly hard, but cooking turns it soft and yellow. The matoke is then mashed while still wrapped in the leaves and is served with a sauce made of vegetables, ground peanuts, or some type of meat such as goat or beef.

Cayeye, also called Mote de Guineo, is a traditional Colombian dish from the Caribbean Coast of the country. Cayeye is made by cooking small green bananas or plantains in water, then mashing and mixing them with refrito, made with onions, garlic, red bell pepper, tomato and achiote. Cayeye are usually served for breakfast with fresh grated Colombian cheese (Queso Costeño) and fried fish, shrimp, crab, or beef. Most popular is Cayeye with fresh cheese, avocado and fried egg on top.

Funche criollo, a dish served for breakfast or dinner, varies on ingredients. Breakfast funche is made with coconut milk, butter, milk, sugar, cornmeal, sweet plantains, and topped with cinnamon, honey, nuts and fruit. The dinner version typically includes green or yellow plantains boiled in broth, butter, sofrito and mashed with taro, cornmeal, or yams. This is a typical dish from Puerto Rico and can be traced back to the Tainos and African slave trade.

=== As a dough ===
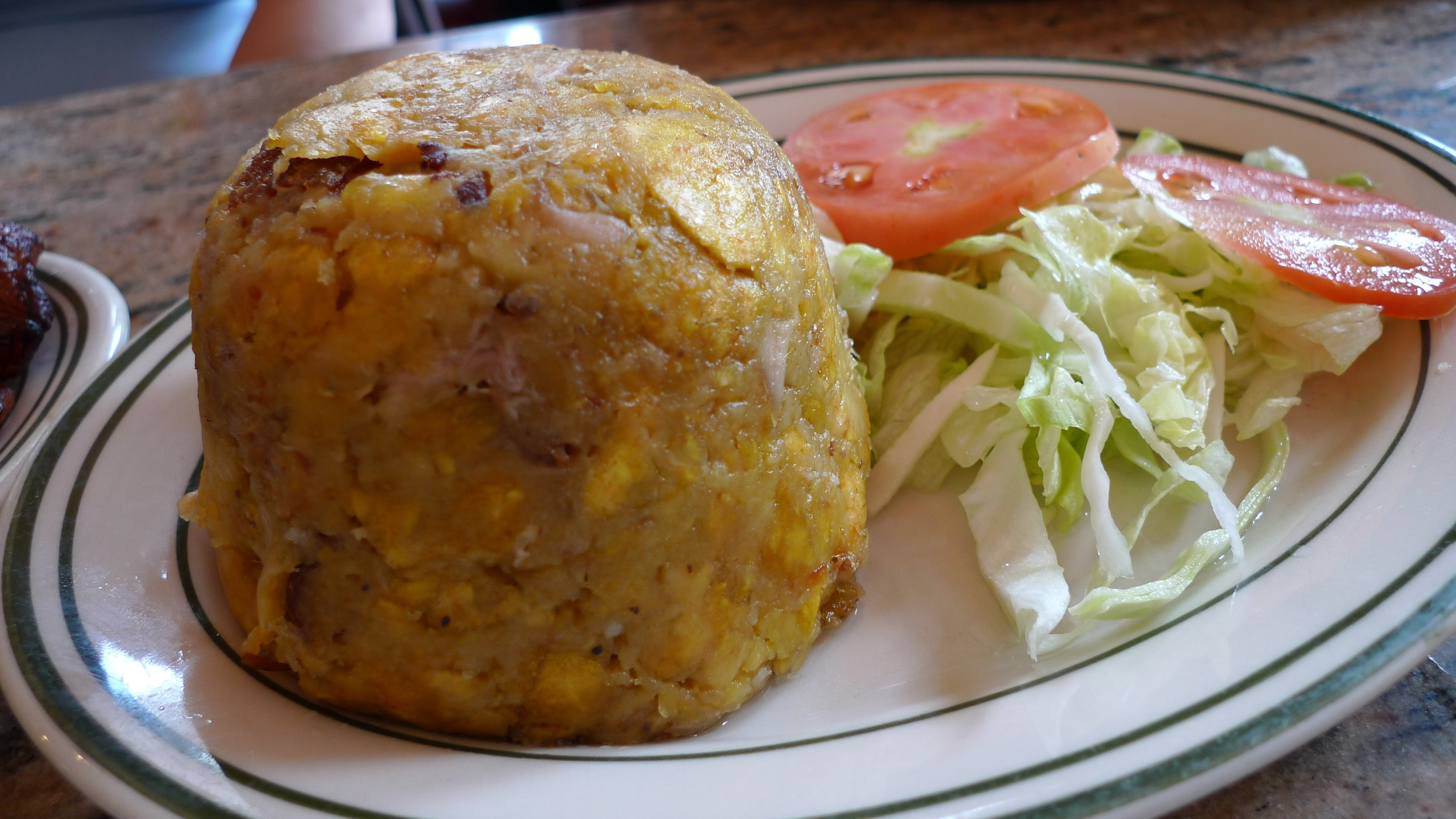
Mofongo made with chicharrón

In Puerto Rico and the Dominican Republic, mofongo is made by mashing fried plantains in a mortar with chicharrón or bacon, garlic, olive oil and stock. Any meat, fish, shellfish, vegetables, spices, or herbs can also be added. The resulting mixture is formed into cylinders the size of about two fists and eaten warm, usually with chicken broth. Mofongo relleno is topped with creole sauce rather than served with chicken broth. Creole sauce may contain stewed beef, chicken or seafood; it is poured into a center crater, formed with the serving spoon, in the mofongo. Grated green bananas and yautias are also used to form masa, a common ingredient for dishes such as alcapurria, which is a type of savory fritter.

Fufu de platano is a traditional and very popular lunch dish in Cuba, and essentially akin to the Puerto Rican mofongo. It is a fufu made by boiling the plantains in water and mashing with a fork. The fufu is then mixed with chicken stock and sofrito, a sauce made from lard, garlic, onions, pepper, tomato sauce, a touch of vinegar and cumin. The texture of Cuban fufu is similar to the mofongo consumed in Puerto Rico, but it is not formed into a ball or fried. Fufu is also a common centuries-old traditional dish made in Côte d'Ivoire, Ghana, Nigeria, Cameroon and other West & Central African countries. It is made in a similar fashion as the Cuban fufu, but is pounded, and has a thick paste, putty-like texture which is then formed into a ball. West African fufu is sometimes separately made with cassava, yams or made with plantains combined with cassava.

=== Other dishes ===
While cooking bananas are starchier and often used in savory dishes as a result, many Philippine desserts also use cooking bananas as a primary ingredient, such as:

- Banana cue - fried ripe saba bananas coated with caramelized sugar.
- Binignit - a dessert soup of glutinous rice in coconut milk with ripe saba bananas as one of the main ingredients.
- Ginanggang - grilled saba bananas coated with margarine and sugar.
- Maruya - banana fritters made from saba bananas and batter.
- Minatamis na saging - saba bananas simmered in a sweet syrup. It is rarely eaten alone, but is instead used as an ingredient in other desserts, notably halo halo.
- Pritong saging - fried ripe saba bananas.
- Pinasugbo - thinly sliced bananas coated with caramelized sugar and sesame seeds and fried until crunchy.
- Saba con hielo - a shaved ice dessert which primarily uses minatamis na saging and milk.
- Turon - a type of dessert lumpia (spring rolls) made from ripe saba bananas wrapped in thin crepe and fried.

In Ecuador, plantain is boiled, crushed, scrambled, and fried into majado. This dish is typically served with a cup of coffee and bistek, fish, or grated cheese. It is a popular breakfast dish. Majado is also used as a base to prepare tigrillo and bolones. To prepare tigrillo, majado is scrambled with pork rind, egg, cheese, green onions, parsley, and cilantro. To prepare bolones, majado is scrambled with cheese, pork rind, or a mixture of both. The resulting mixture is then shaped into a sphere which is later deep-fried. Both tigrillo and bolones are typically served with a cup of coffee.

== Other preparations ==
=== Chips ===
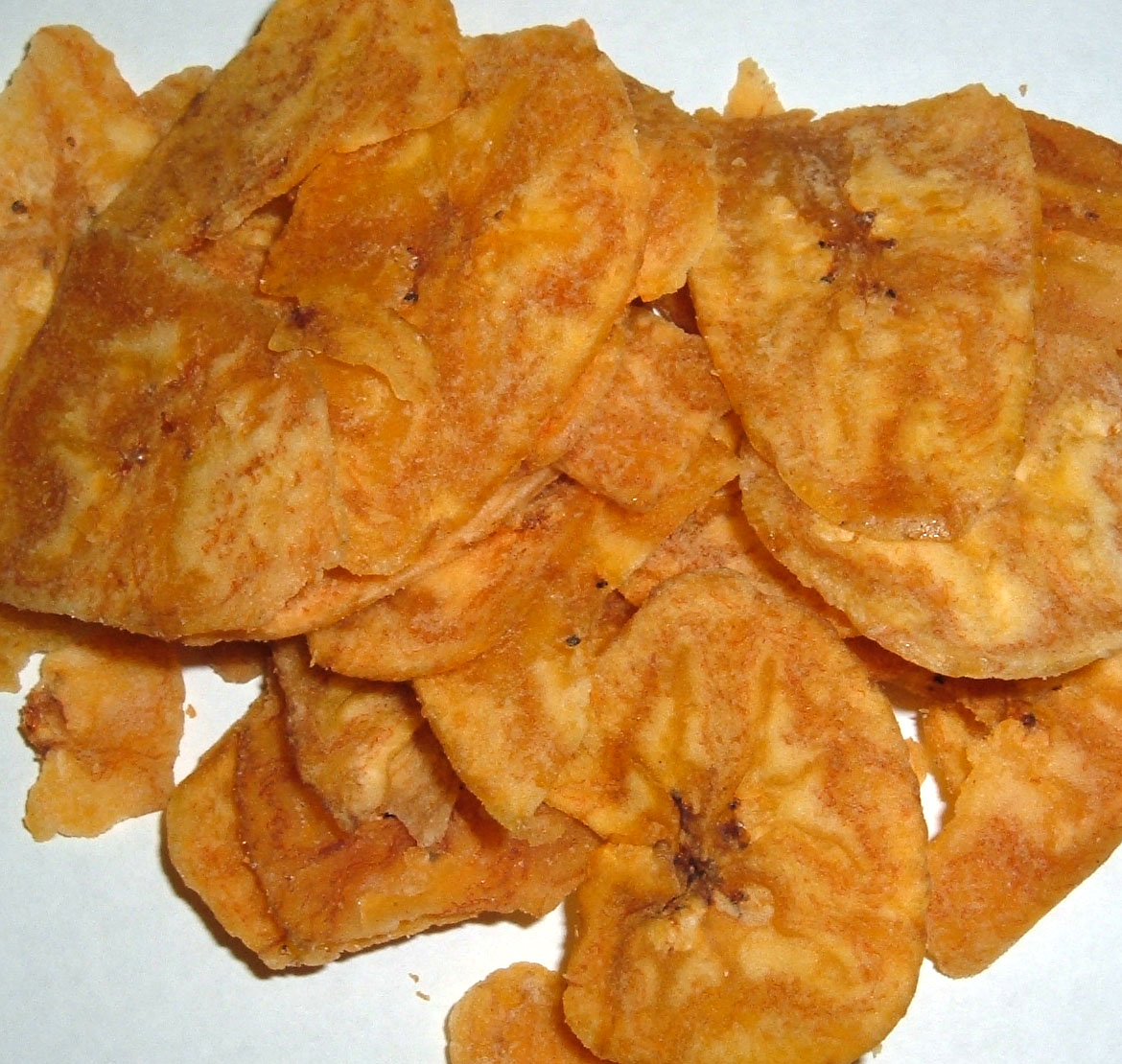
Banana chips

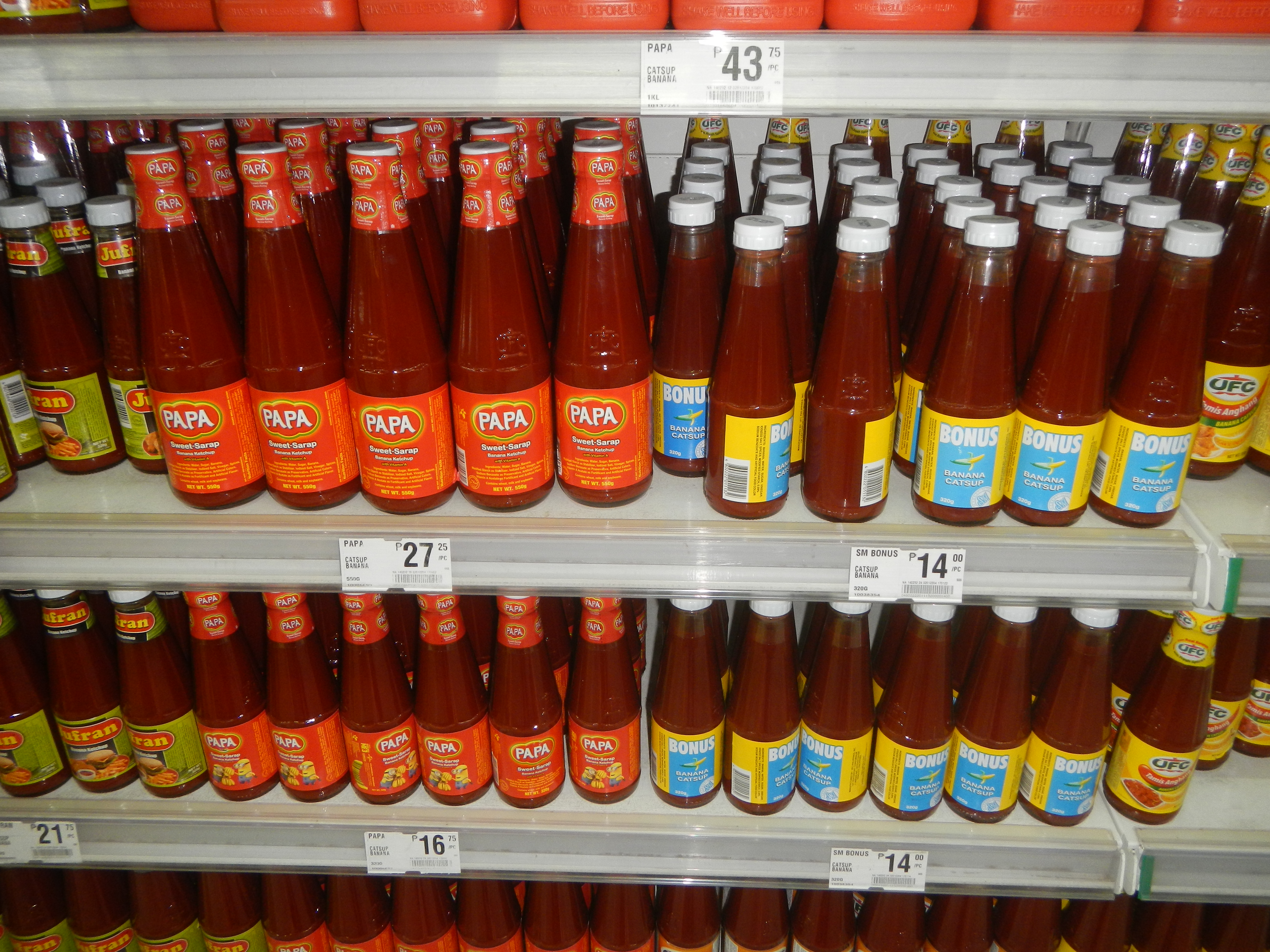
Various brands of banana ketchup from the Philippines

After removing the skin, the unripe fruit can be sliced thin and deep fried in hot oil to produce chips. This thin preparation of plantain is known as tostones, patacones or plataninas in some of Central American and South American countries, platanutres in Puerto Rico, mariquitas or chicharritas in Cuba and chifles in Ecuador and Peru. However, in Cuba, the Dominican Republic, Guatemala, Puerto Rico, and Venezuela, tostones instead refers to thicker twice-fried patties (see below). In Cuba, plantain chips are called mariquitas. They are sliced thinly, and fried in oil until golden colored. They are popular appetizers served with a main dish. In Colombia they are known as platanitos and are eaten with suero atollabuey as a snack. Tostada refers to a green, unripe plantain which has been cut into sections, fried, flattened, fried again, and salted. These tostadas are often served as a side dish or a snack. They are also known as tostones or patacones in many Latin American countries. In Honduras, banana chips are called tajadas, which may be sliced vertically to create a variation known as plantain strips.

In Africa, ipekere are plantain chips by the Yorubas It is made with varying stages of plantain, from very ripe, ripe to semi unripe and unripe. It is also fried as chips in various ways: plain, salted, seasoned or with various degrees of spiciness. There are different consistency in textures by preferences.

Chips fried in coconut oil and sprinkled with salt, called upperi or kaya varuthathu, are a snack in South India in Kerala. They are an important item in sadya, a vegetarian feast prepared during festive occasions in Kerala. The chips are typically labeled "plantain chips" when they are made of green plantains that taste starchy, like potato chips. In Tamil Nadu, a thin variety made from green plantains is used to make chips seasoned with salt, chili powder and asafoetida. In the western/central Indian language Marathi, the plantain is called rajeli kela (figuratively meaning "king-sized" banana), and is often used to make fried chips.

=== Dried flour ===
In South-west Nigeria, unripe plantains are also dried and ground into flour which is referred to as Elubo Ogede. it is considered as a healthy and nutritious food among the Yoruba.

In southern India, dried plantain powder is mixed with a little bit of fennel seed powder and boiled in milk or water to make baby food to feed babies until they are one year old.

=== Drink ===
In Peru, plantains are boiled and blended with water, spices, and sugar to make chapo. In Kerala, ripe plantains are boiled with sago, coconut milk, sugar and spices to make a pudding.

=== Ketchup ===
The Philippines uniquely processes saba bananas into banana ketchup. It was originally invented in World War II as a substitute for tomato ketchup.

== Nutrition ==
Plantains, raw "Musa × paradisiaca" (Daily Value)
Nutritional value per 100 g (3.5 oz)
- Energy: 510 kJ (120 kcal)
- Carbohydrates: 31.89 g
- Sugars: 10 g
- Dietary fiber: 2.3 g
- Fat: 0.37 g
- Protein: 1.3 g
Vitamins and minerals
Vitamins	Quantity %DV^{†}
Vitamin A equiv. beta-Carotene	6% 56 μg 4% 457 μg
Thiamine (B1)	4% 0.052 mg
Riboflavin (B2)	4% 0.054 mg
Niacin (B3)	4% 0.686 mg
Pantothenic acid (B5)	5% 0.26 mg
Vitamin B6	18% 0.299 mg
Folate (B9)	6% 22 μg
Choline	2% 13.5 mg
Vitamin C	20% 18.4 mg
Vitamin E	1% 0.14 mg
Vitamin K	1% 0.7 μg
Minerals	Quantity %DV^{†}
Calcium	0% 3 mg
Iron	3% 0.6 mg
Magnesium	9% 37 mg
Phosphorus	3% 34 mg
Potassium	17% 499 mg
Sodium	0% 4 mg
Zinc	1% 0.14 mg
- Other constituents: Quantity
- Water: 65.3 g
- Full Link to USDA Database entry
- ^{†}Percentages estimated using US recommendations for adults, except for potassium, which is estimated based on expert recommendation from the National Academies.

Plantain is 32% carbohydrates with 2% dietary fiber and 15% sugars, 1% protein, 0.4% fat, and 65% water, and supplying 510 kilojoules (122 kilocalories) of food energy in a 100-gram (3 1/2-ounce) reference serving (table). Raw plantain is an excellent source (20% or higher of the Daily Value, DV) of vitamin B6 (23% DV) and vitamin C (22% DV), and a good source (10–19% DV) of magnesium and potassium (table).

Containing little beta-carotene (457 micrograms per 100 grams), plantain is not a good source of vitamin A (table).

=== Comparison to other staple foods ===
The following table shows the nutrient content of raw plantain and other major staple foods in a raw form on a dry weight basis to account for their different water contents.

Nutrient content of 10 major staple foods per 100 g dry weight
Staple	Maize (corn)^{[A]}	Rice, white^{[B]}	Wheat^{[C]}	Potatoes^{[D]}	Cassava^{[E]}	Soybeans, green^{[F]}	Sweet potatoes^{[G]}	Yams^{[Y]}	Sorghum^{[H]}	Plantain^{[Z]}	RDA
Water content (%)	10	12	13	79	60	68	77	70	9	65	
Raw grams per 100 g dry weight	111	114	115	476	250	313	435	333	110	286	
Nutrient											
Energy (kJ)	1698	1736	1574	1533	1675	1922	1565	1647	1559	1460	8,368–10,460
Protein (g)	10.4	8.1	14.5	9.5	3.5	40.6	7.0	5.0	12.4	3.7	50
Fat (g)	5.3	0.8	1.8	0.4	0.7	21.6	0.2	0.6	3.6	1.1	44–77
Carbohydrates (g)	82	91	82	81	95	34	87	93	82	91	130
Fiber (g)	8.1	1.5	14.0	10.5	4.5	13.1	13.0	13.7	6.9	6.6	30
Sugar (g)	0.7	0.1	0.5	3.7	4.3	0.0	18.2	1.7	0.0	42.9	minimal
Minerals	^{[A]}	^{[B]}	^{[C]}	^{[D]}	^{[E]}	^{[F]}	^{[G]}	^{[Y]}	^{[H]}	^{[Z]}	RDA
Calcium (mg)	8	32	33	57	40	616	130	57	31	9	1,000
Iron (mg)	3.01	0.91	3.67	3.71	0.68	11.09	2.65	1.80	4.84	1.71	8
Magnesium (mg)	141	28	145	110	53	203	109	70	0	106	400
Phosphorus (mg)	233	131	331	271	68	606	204	183	315	97	700
Potassium (mg)	319	131	417	2005	678	1938	1465	2720	385	1426	4700
Sodium (mg)	39	6	2	29	35	47	239	30	7	11	1,500
Zinc (mg)	2.46	1.24	3.05	1.38	0.85	3.09	1.30	0.80	0.00	0.40	11
Copper (mg)	0.34	0.25	0.49	0.52	0.25	0.41	0.65	0.60	-	0.23	0.9
Manganese (mg)	0.54	1.24	4.59	0.71	0.95	1.72	1.13	1.33	-	-	2.3
Selenium (μg)	17.2	17.2	81.3	1.4	1.8	4.7	2.6	2.3	0.0	4.3	55
Vitamins	^{[A]}	^{[B]}	^{[C]}	^{[D]}	^{[E]}	^{[F]}	^{[G]}	^{[Y]}	^{[H]}	^{[Z]}	RDA
Vitamin C (mg)	0.0	0.0	0.0	93.8	51.5	90.6	10.4	57.0	0.0	52.6	90
Thiamin (B1) (mg)	0.43	0.08	0.34	0.38	0.23	1.38	0.35	0.37	0.26	0.14	1.2
Riboflavin (B2) (mg)	0.22	0.06	0.14	0.14	0.13	0.56	0.26	0.10	0.15	0.14	1.3
Niacin (B3) (mg)	4.03	1.82	6.28	5.00	2.13	5.16	2.43	1.83	3.22	1.97	16
Pantothenic acid (B5) (mg)	0.47	1.15	1.09	1.43	0.28	0.47	3.48	1.03	-	0.74	5
Vitamin B6 (mg)	0.69	0.18	0.34	1.43	0.23	0.22	0.91	0.97	-	0.86	1.3
Folate Total (B9) (μg)	21	9	44	76	68	516	48	77	0	63	400
Vitamin A (IU)	238	0	10	10	33	563	4178	460	0	3220	5000
Vitamin E, alpha-tocopherol (mg)	0.54	0.13	1.16	0.05	0.48	0.00	1.13	1.30	0.00	0.40	15
Vitamin K1 (μg)	0.3	0.1	2.2	9.0	4.8	0.0	7.8	8.7	0.0	2.0	120
Beta-carotene (μg)	108	0	6	5	20	0	36996	277	0	1306	10500
Lutein+zeaxanthin (μg)	1506	0	253	38	0	0	0	0	0	86	6000
Fats	^{[A]}	^{[B]}	^{[C]}	^{[D]}	^{[E]}	^{[F]}	^{[G]}	^{[Y]}	^{[H]}	^{[Z]}	RDA
Saturated fatty acids (g)	0.74	0.20	0.30	0.14	0.18	2.47	0.09	0.13	0.51	0.40	minimal
Monounsaturated fatty acids (g)	1.39	0.24	0.23	0.00	0.20	4.00	0.00	0.03	1.09	0.09	22–55
Polyunsaturated fatty acids (g)	2.40	0.20	0.72	0.19	0.13	10.00	0.04	0.27	1.51	0.20	13–19
	^{[A]}	^{[B]}	^{[C]}	^{[D]}	^{[E]}	^{[F]}	^{[G]}	^{[Y]}	^{[H]}	^{[Z]}	RDA

^{A} raw yellow dent corn
^{B} raw unenriched long-grain white rice
^{C} raw hard red winter wheat
^{D} raw potato with flesh and skin
^{E} raw cassava
^{F} raw green soybeans
^{G} raw sweet potato
^{H} raw sorghum
^{Y} raw yam
^{Z} raw plantains
^{/*} unofficial

== Allergies ==
Plantain and banana allergies occur with typical characteristics of food allergy or latex fruit syndrome, including itching and mild swelling of the lips, tongue, palate or throat, skin rash, stomach complaints or anaphylactic shock. Among more than 1000 proteins identified in Musa species were numerous previously described protein allergens.

== See also ==
- List of banana cultivars
- List of banana dishes
- Cavendish banana subgroup
- Gros Michel banana
- Matoke
- Musa balbisiana
- Rhino Horn banana
- Saba banana
