= Ginataang saba =

Filipino dessert

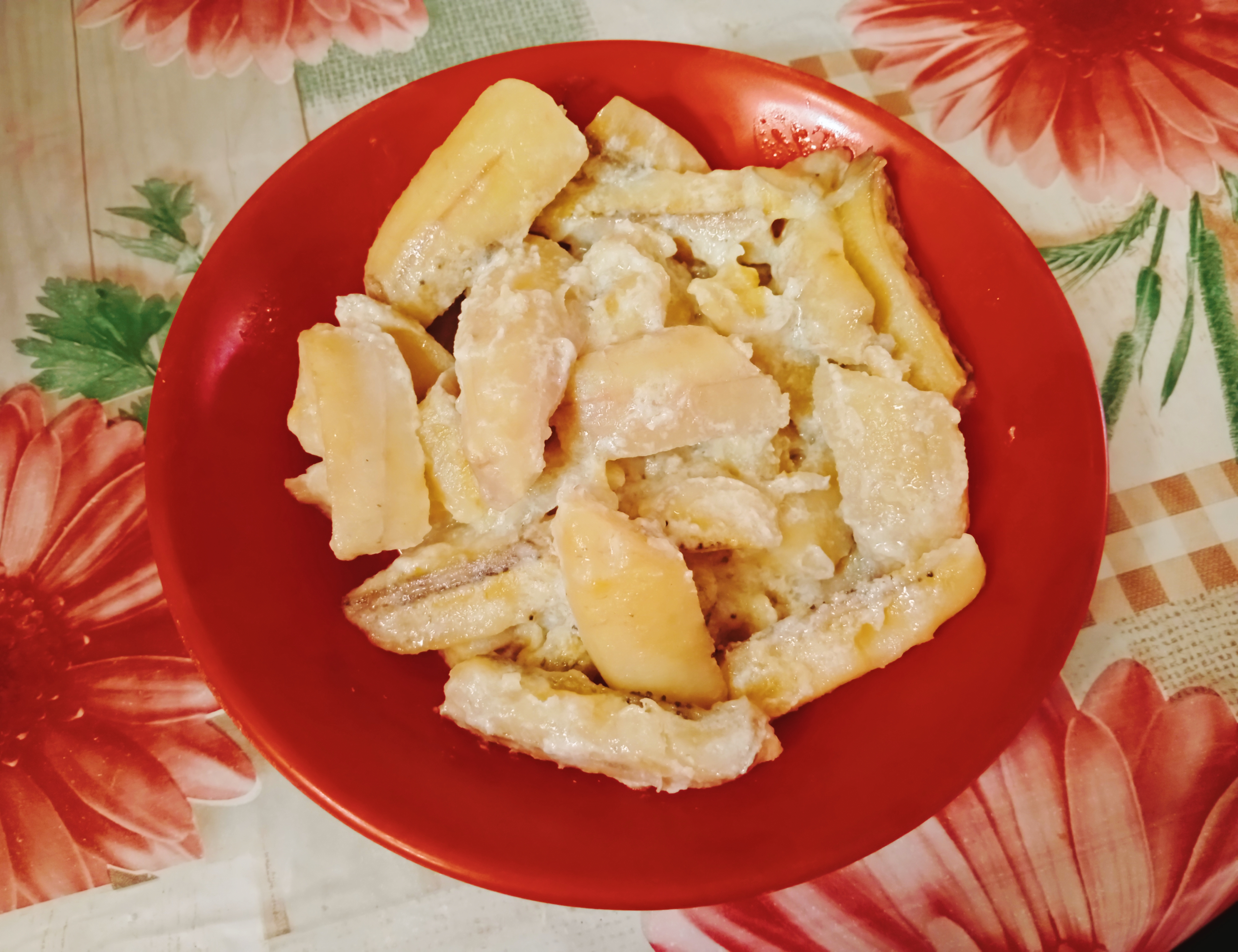
- Pinakro/ Ginaatang saba
- Alternative names: Ginataang saging, saba sa gata, sareala, pinakro
- Type: Snack
- Region or state: Philippines
- Main ingredients: Saba banana, coconut milk
- Similar dishes: binignit, minatamis na saging

Ginataang saba is a Filipino dessert made from ripe saba or cardaba bananas stewed in sweetened coconut milk. It is traditionally eaten warm, but it can also be eaten chilled. It is a type of ginataan. It is also known as saba sa gata, ginataang saging, sareala, among other names. Sago pearls are also commonly added to the dish, in which case it becomes ginataang saging at sago.

It is also known as pinakro in the Bicol Region, although pinakro is more accurately a different dish that can also be made with breadfruit, cassava, and other starchy root crops.

== See also ==
- Saba con hielo
- Minatamis na saging
- Bilo-bilo
- List of banana dishes
