= Pritong saging =

Filipino snack of fried ripe bananas

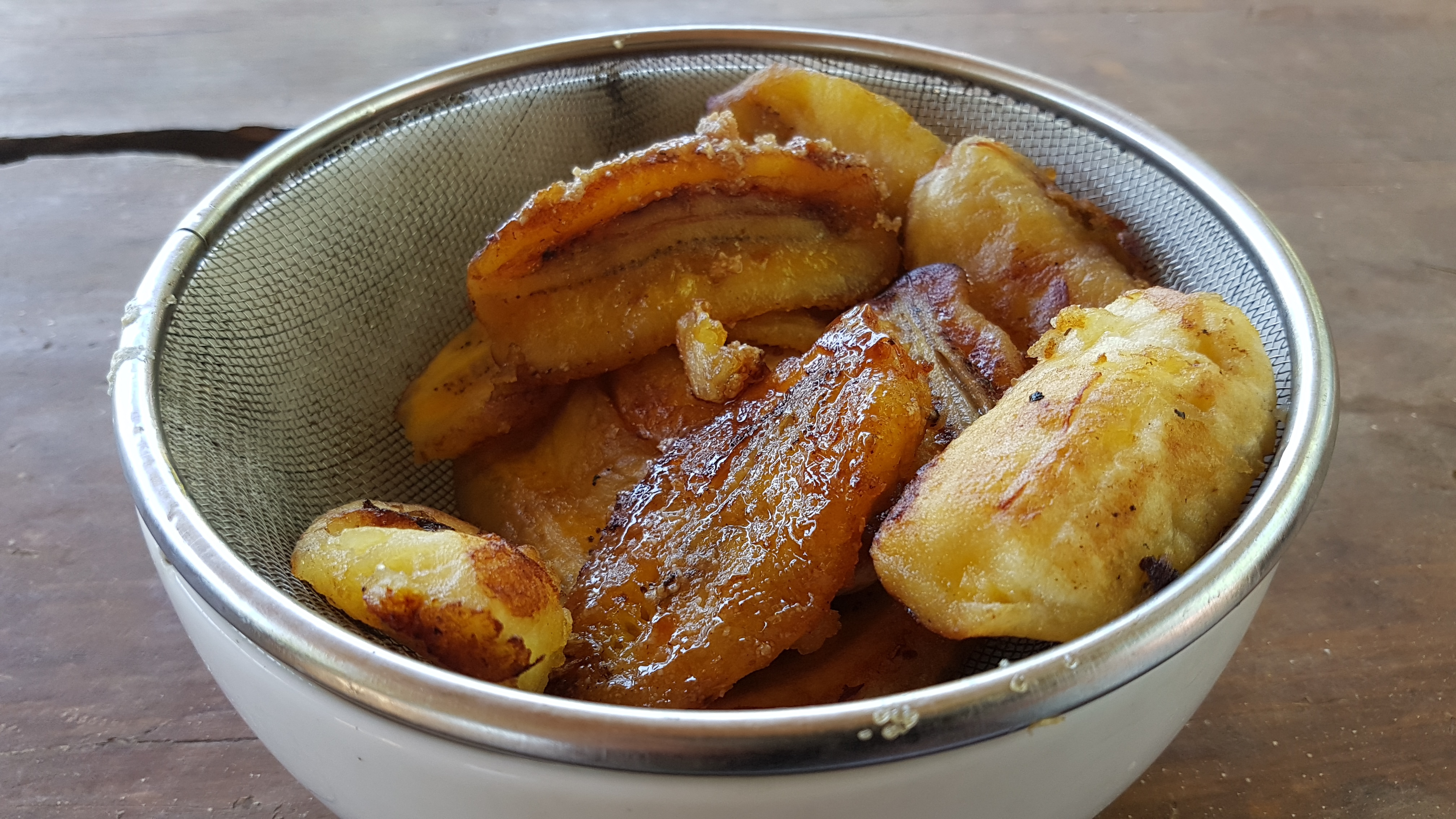
- Alternative names: Pritong saba, piniritong saging
- Type: Snack
- Region or state: Philippines
- Main ingredients: Saba banana
- Similar dishes: pisang goreng

Pritong saging (lit. 'fried banana'), also known as pritong saba, is a Filipino snack made from ripe saba or cardaba bananas sliced lengthwise and fried in oil. The bananas used are ideally very ripe, in which case it naturally caramelizes and no sugar is added. When younger starchier bananas are used, it is often eaten dipped in muscovado sugar, syrup, or coconut caramel (latik). Unlike the similar pisang goreng of neighboring countries, it is not as popular as street food. Instead it is regarded as a simple home-made snack, most commonly eaten for merienda.

== See also ==
- Maruya (food)
- Banana cue
- Pisang goreng
- Chuối chiên
- Fried plantain
- List of banana dishes
