= List of banana dishes =

Listing of various banana dishes

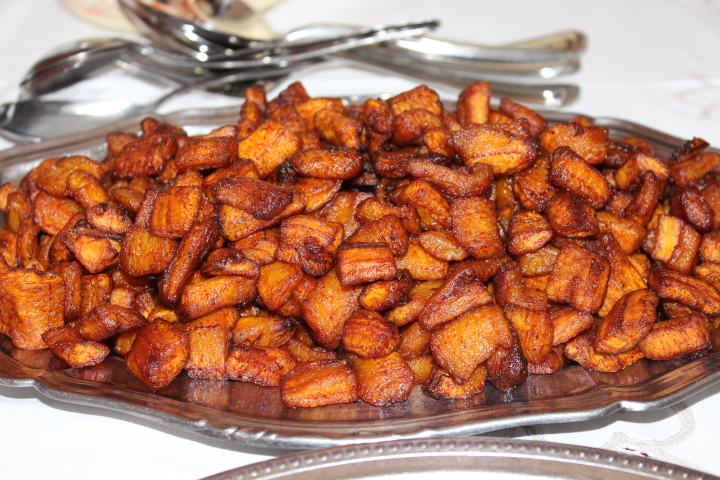
A platter of fried plantains

This is a list of banana dishes and foods in which banana or plantain is used as a primary ingredient. A banana is an edible fruit produced by several kinds of large herbaceous flowering plants in the genus Musa. In some countries, bananas used for cooking may be called plantains. The fruit is variable in size, color and firmness, but is usually elongated and curved, with soft flesh rich in starch covered with a rind which may be green, yellow, red, purple, or brown when ripe. The fruits grow in clusters hanging from the top of the plant.

== Banana dishes ==
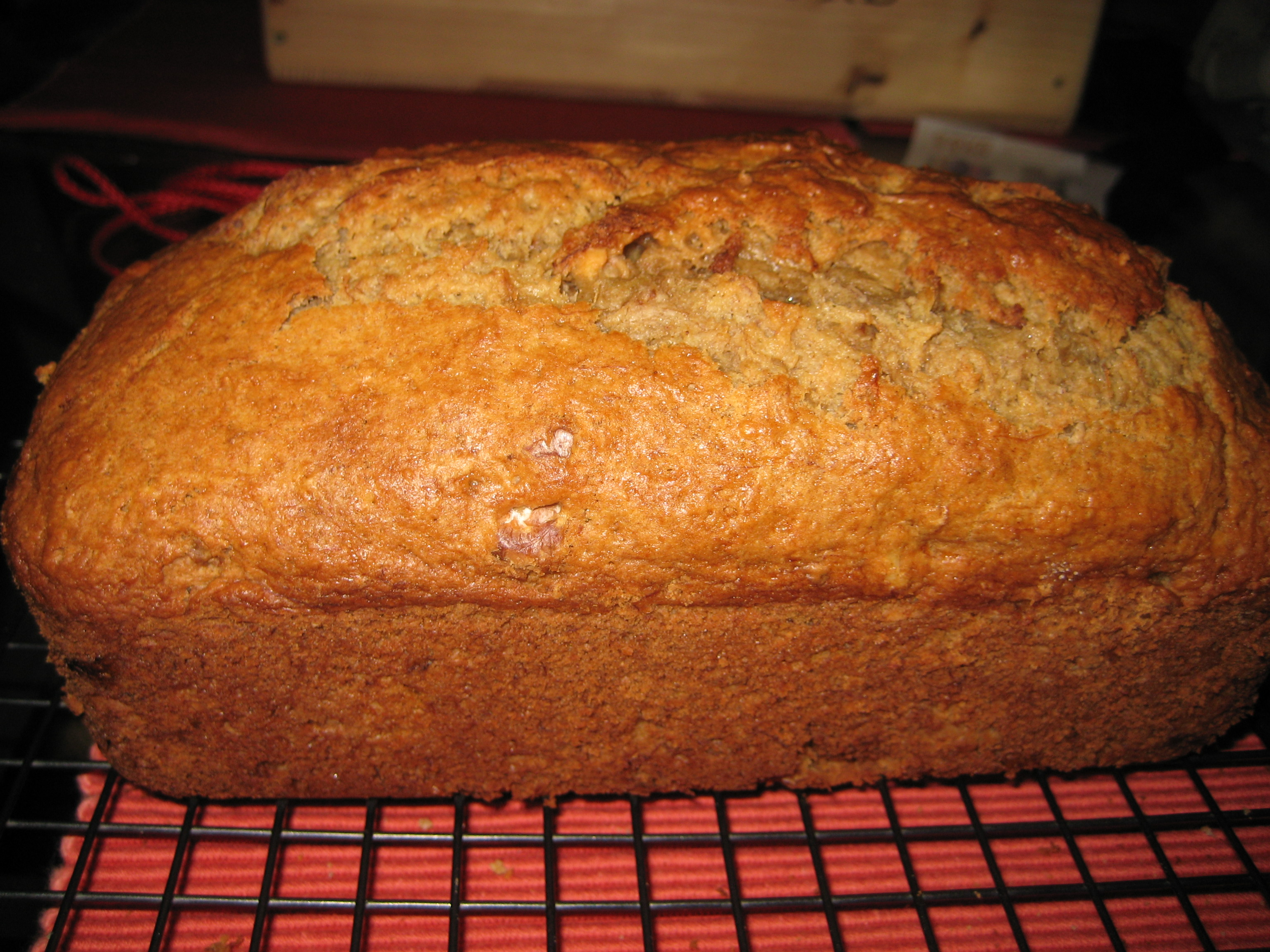
A loaf of banana bread

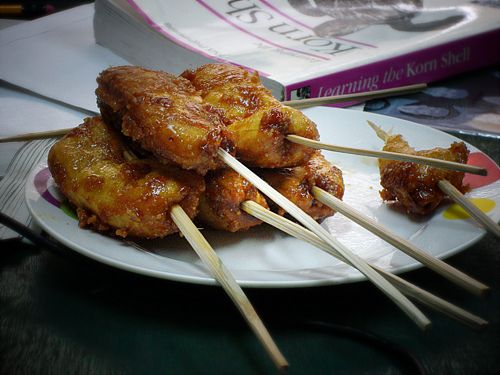
Banana cue is usually served on bamboo skewers

- Alcapurria – Fritter from Puerto Rico
- Alloco – Cooked dish made from plantains
- Banana boat – Dessert made of banana
- Banana bread – Cake made from mashed bananas
- Banoffee pie – English dessert pie
- Banana cake – Cake made from banana
- Banana chip – Chip made of banana
- Banana cream pie – American dessert
- Banana cue – Banana dish from Philippines
- Banana custard – Banana slices mixed with custard
- Banana flour – Flour traditionally made of green bananas
- Banana fritter – Deep-fried battered banana or plantain
- Banana ketchup – Sauce made from bananas
- Banana muffin – Cake made from mashed bananas
- Banana pancake – Thin round cake made of eggs, milk, and flour
- Banana pasta – Type of pasta made from bananas
- Banana pudding – Dessert made from banana
- Banana roll – Chinese pastry common in Hong Kong
- Banana milkshake
- Banana smoothie
- Banana split – Banana dishes
- Bananas Foster – Dessert
- Bánh chuối – Sweet banana pancake
- Boli – Roasted plantain dish in Nigeria of the Yorubas
- Cayeye – Colombian dish
- Chapo – Peruvian drink
- Chifle – Fried plantain chip dish
- Flying Jacob – Type of casserole from Sweden
- Fried plantain – Cooked dish made from plantains
- Pizza - in Sweden, bananas are a common pizza topping

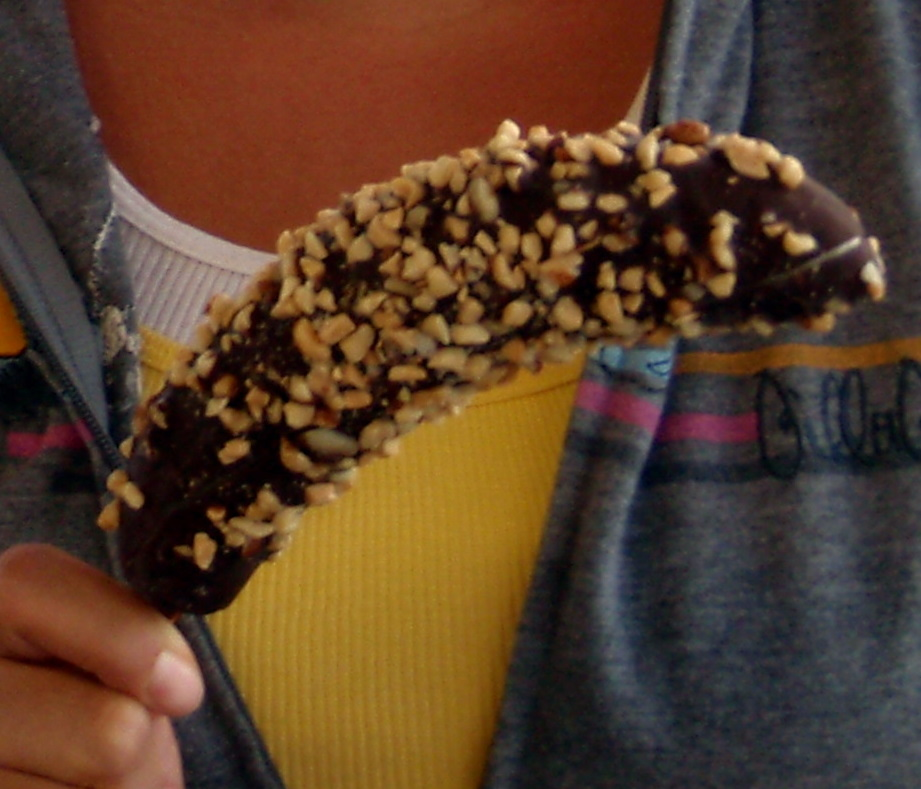
A frozen banana

- Frozen banana – Banana dishes
- Fufu – Dough-like food in African cuisine
- Ginanggang – Filipino banana snack food
- Ginataang saba – Filipino dessert
- Guineos en Escabeche – Ibero-American fish, meat or vegetable dish - Puerto Rican pickled green banana with chicken gizzard
- Jemput-jemput – Malaysian and Indonesian fritter
- Kolak pisang
- Ledre – a Bojonegoro rolled banana crepe.
- Mangú – Dominican traditional dish

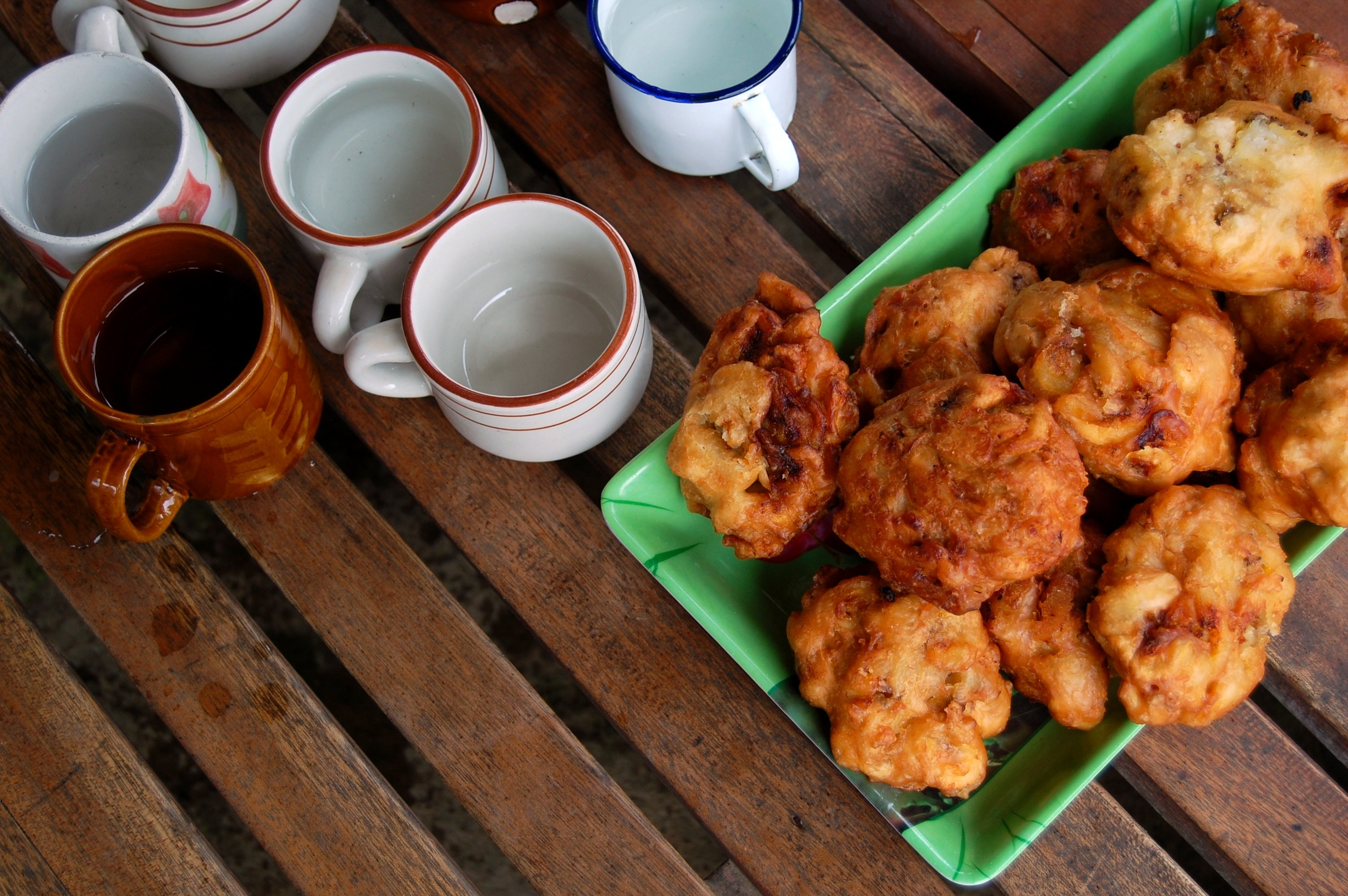
Maruya is a type of fritter from the Philippines usually made from bananas.

- Maruya – Filipino banana fritters
- Matoke – Banana cultivar
- Minatamis na saging – Filipino dessert
- Mofongo – Traditional Puerto Rico dish
- Nagasari – Indonesian steamed cake
- Nendra Banana Jamun
- Nilagang saging – Filipino dish of boiled bananas dipped in fermented fish paste
- Nilupak na saging – Class of traditional Filipino delicacies
- Pasteles – Caribbean and Latin American dish
- Pastelón – Puerto Rican and Dominican casserole
- Pinakro – Filipino dessert
- Pinasugbo – Filipino dessert
- Pisang cokelat – Indonesian cuisine
- Pisang epe – a Makassar grilled banana with toppings.
- Pisang plenet – a Semarang flattened banana with toppings.
- Plantain soup – Plantain soup dish
- Poke – Polynesian pudding
- Pritong saging – Filipino snack of fried ripe bananas
- Rellenitos de plátano – Guatemalan dish
- Tacacho – Peruvian breakfast dish
- Tostones – Fried plantain found in Latin American and Caribbean cuisine
- Turon – Sweet dish from Filipino cuisine
Banana dishes

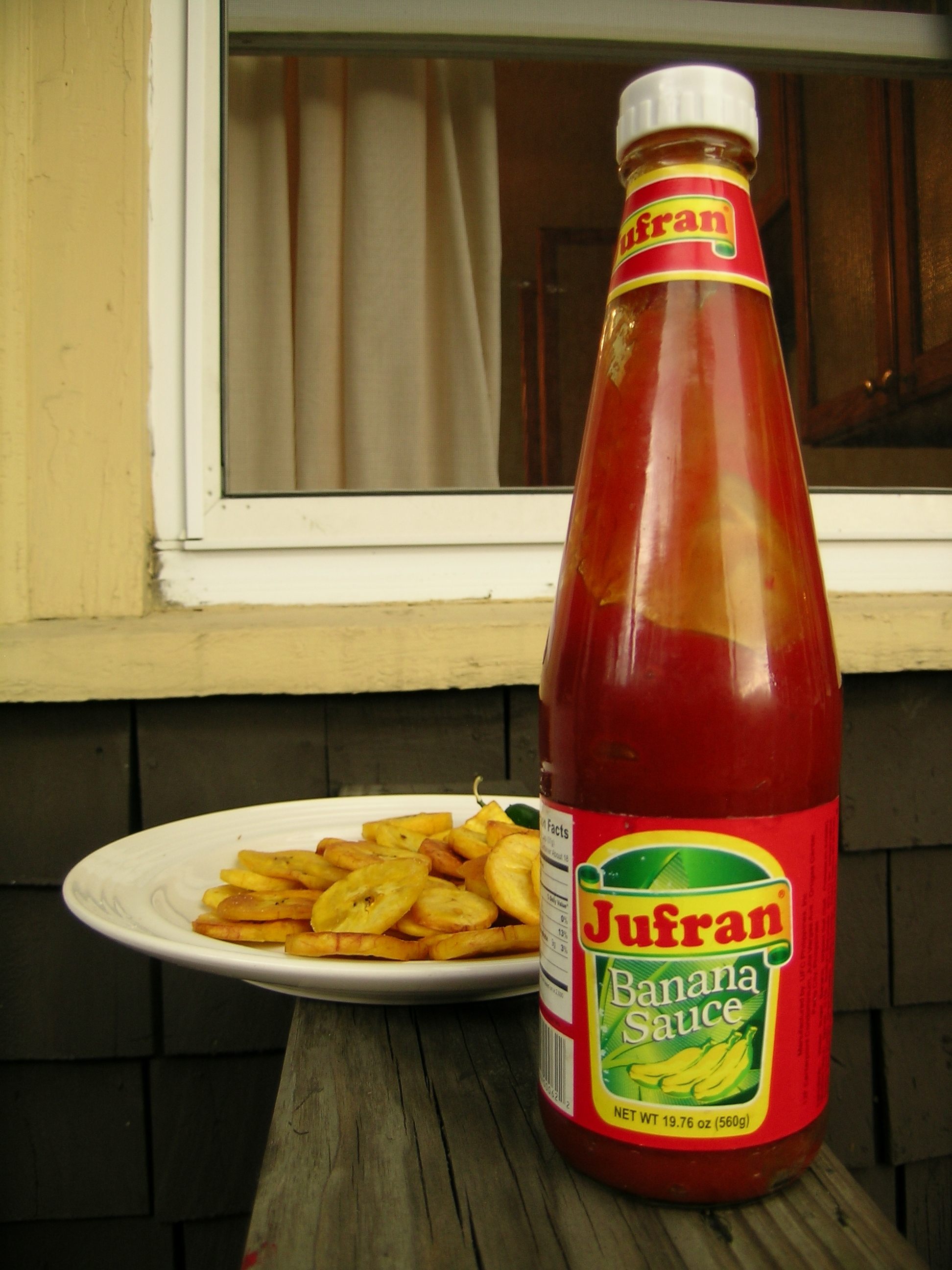
Banana ketchup is a popular Philippine condiment made from mashed banana, sugar, vinegar, and spices.

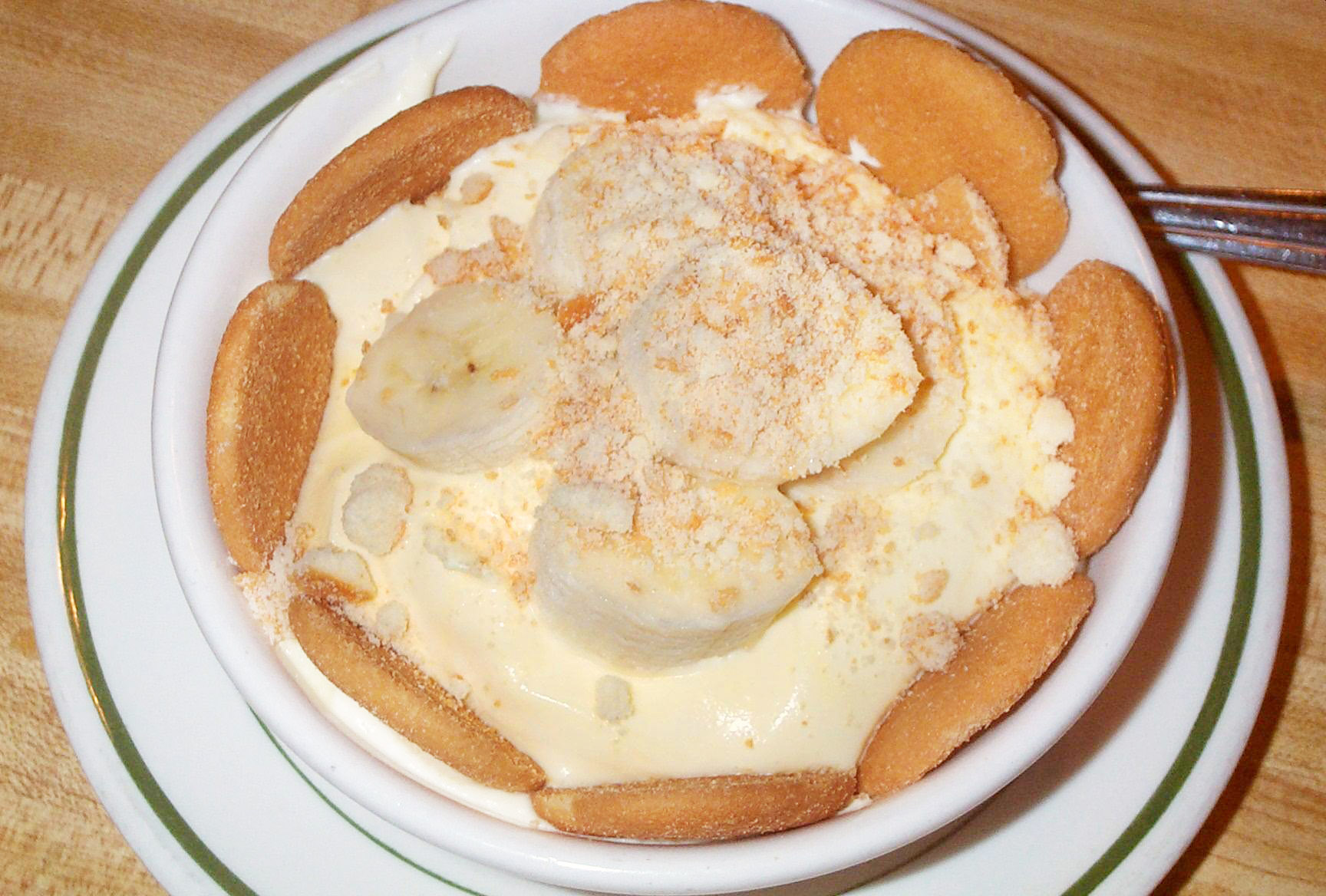
Homemade banana pudding served with vanilla wafers

Bánh chuối is a sweet banana cake or bread pudding that originated in Vietnam.

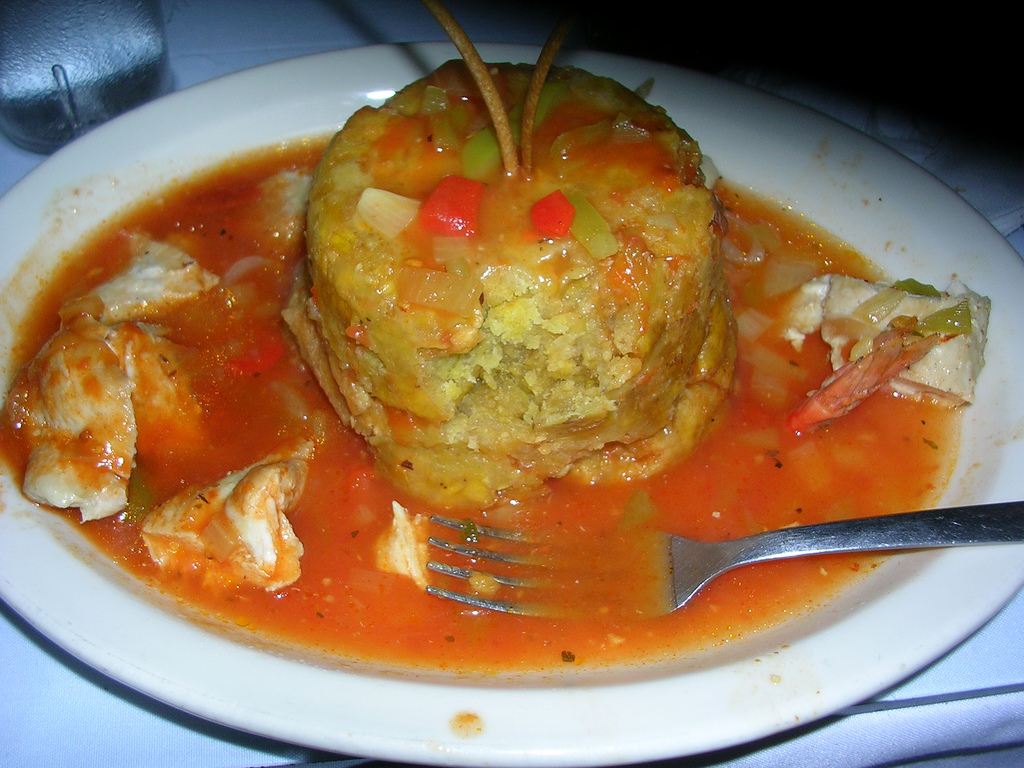
Mofongo is a fried plantain-based dish from Puerto Rico.

== See also ==
- Cooking plantain
- List of banana cultivars
- List of banana and plantain diseases
- List of fruit dishes
- Guineo - Green banana dishes from Puerto Rico.
- Twinkies, originally flavored with banana
