= Minatamis na saging =

Filipino dessert

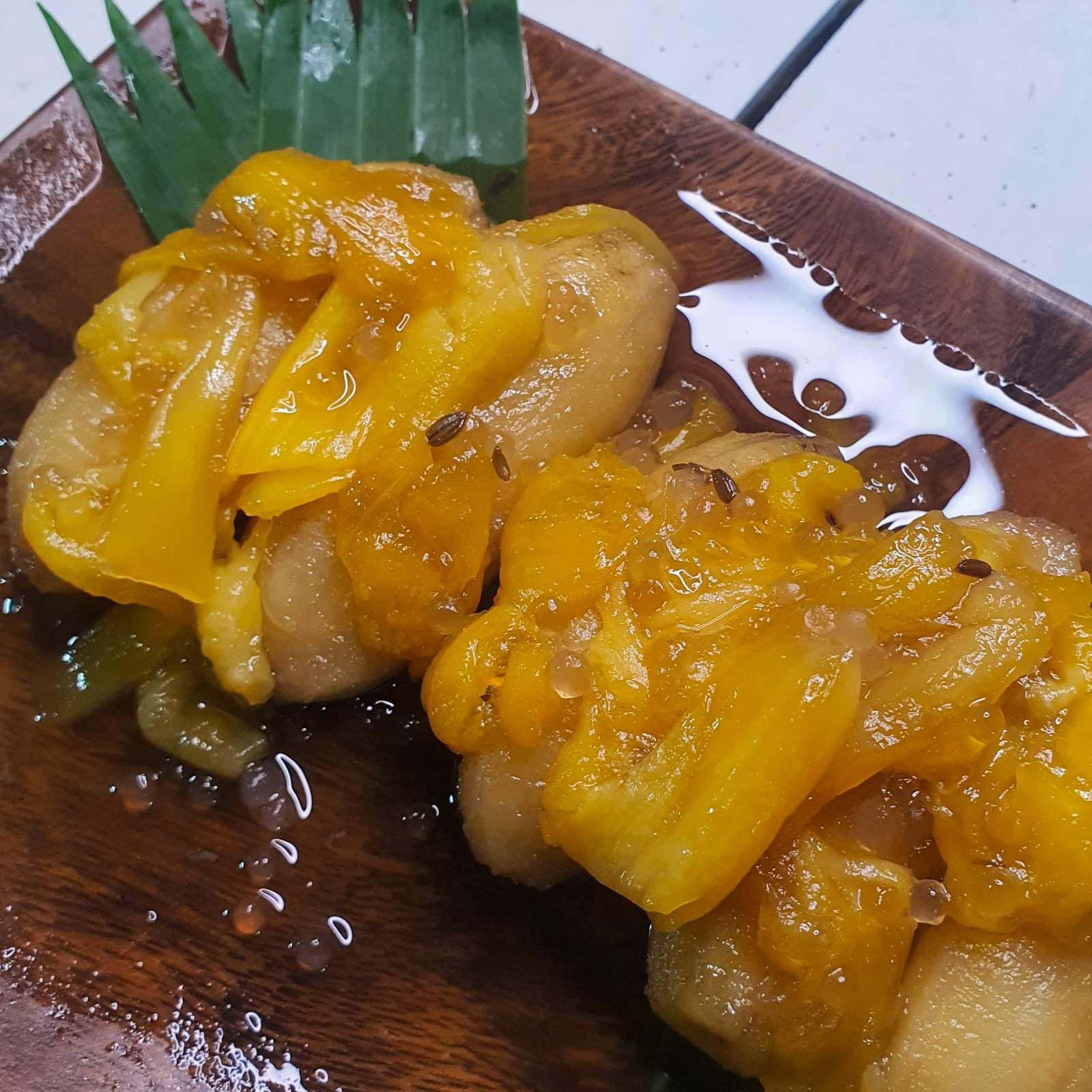
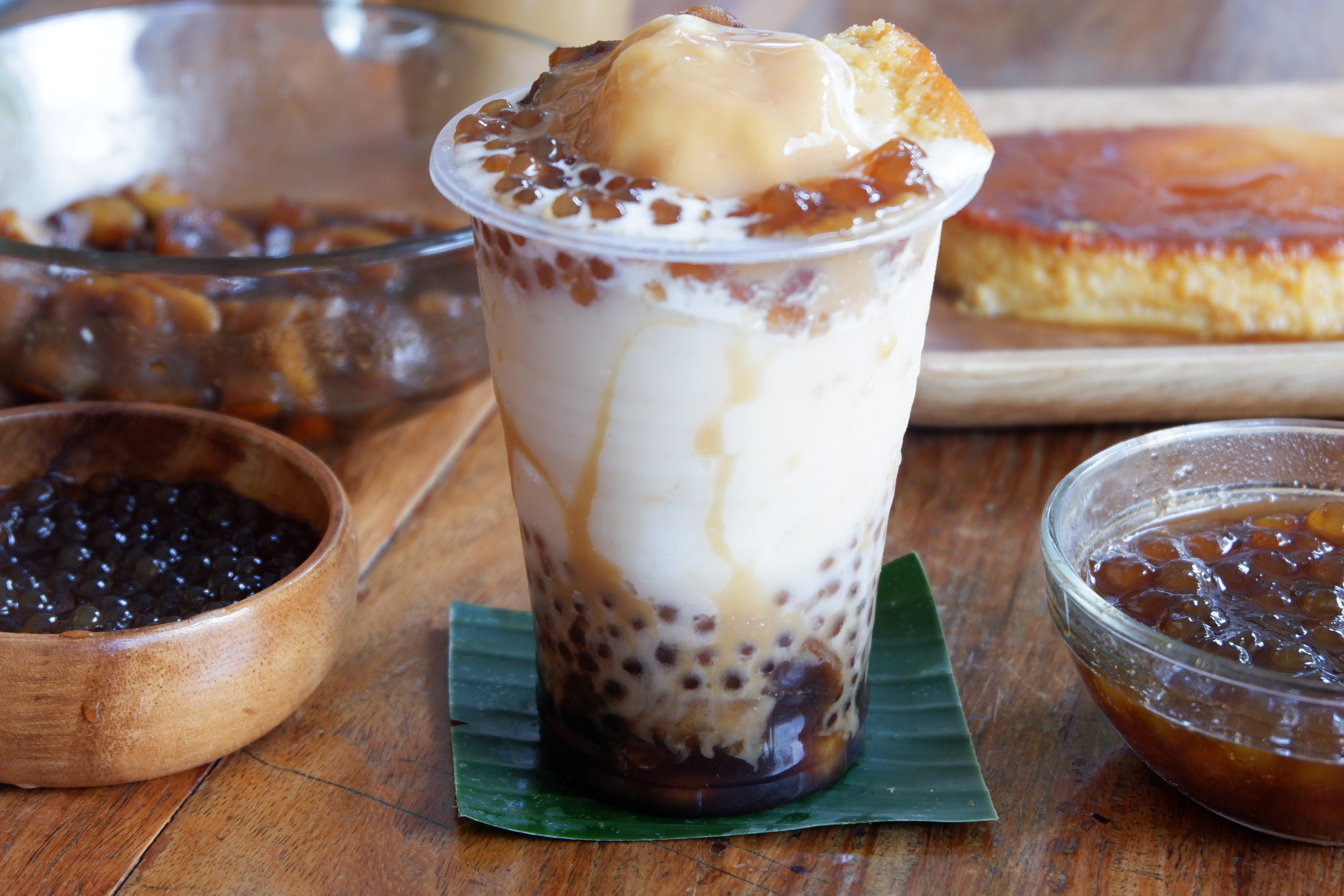
- Top: Minatamis na saging with jackfruit Bottom: Saba con yelo
- Region or state: Philippines
- Main ingredients: saba banana, syrup
- Variations: Saba con yelo

Minatamis na saging (literally "sweetened banana") is a Filipino dessert made with chopped saba bananas cooked in a sweet syrup (arnibal) made with muscovado sugar and water. Some recipes also add a little bit of salt and pandan leaf or vanilla extract. Other ingredients can also be added like sweet potato, sago, or other fruits like jackfruit. It can be eaten on its own or added as an ingredient to other desserts (notably for halo-halo). Adding the dessert over milk and shaved ice also results in another dessert known as saba con yelo (also sabá con hielo in Spanish).

The dish can also be cooked with coconut milk instead of water, which is differentiated as ginataang saba.

== See also ==
- Nilagang saging
- Ice buko
- Banana cue
- Ginanggang
- List of banana dishes
- Maruya
- Turon
- Compote
