= Banana pasta =

Type of pasta made from bananas

Banana pasta is a type of pasta prepared using banana as a primary ingredient. The product is typically made with unripe, green bananas that are dried and then milled into banana flour. Banana pasta is a gluten-free food. The product can be dried for later cooking or can be cooked immediately after preparation. Banana pasta is cooked like standard pasta, typically by boiling it. A study found that banana pasta has a higher water absorption rate compared to standard pasta, which generates higher yields after cooking.

In 2012, University of Brasília researchers found that banana pasta can be a useful product for those with celiac disease, and that compared to whole wheat pasta, banana pasta is lower in calories and fat, higher in protein, and less expensive to produce. The product has also shown promise as a means to utilize green bananas, which have few industrial uses and a low commercial value.

== History ==
=== University of Brasília study ===
In 2012, food scientists at the University of Brasília conducted a study involving the creation of a banana pasta using green bananas, which were milled into flour; they published their results in the Journal of the Academy of Nutrition and Dietetics. In a taste test comprising 25 participants with celiac disease, a disease caused by an adverse reaction to gluten, and 50 without the disease, both groups favored the flavor of banana pasta compared to other gluten-free pastas, such as those prepared from brown rice, soybeans, quinoa, and potatoes. The group without celiac disease was also given pasta prepared from wheat flour, as a comparison. Favorable responses were higher among those with celiac disease, and was lower among those lacking the disease. Also, the non-celiac group "rated the green banana pasta the same as whole wheat pasta for flavor, aroma and appearance and liked the texture of the banana dish better".

Compared to whole wheat pasta, the researchers found that banana pasta is higher in protein, lower in fat and calories, and less expensive to produce than whole wheat pasta. It was also suggested that banana pasta may contribute to controlling intestinal regularity and glycemic indexes because of the high levels of resistant starch in banana pasta.

=== Commercial production ===
In 2017, Tonya Ifill, an entrepreneur in Barbados, developed a banana pasta made with green bananas. Ifill stated that a significant aspect of developing the product was determining a proper amount of water to add to the banana flour, and that water temperature was an important factor as well. For example, if the water was too hot, the pasta crumbled.

== See also ==
- List of banana dishes
- List of pasta
- Somali cuisine
- Filipino cuisine
  - Filipino spaghetti
