= Chapo (drink) =

Peruvian drink

Chapo is a beverage made of sweet plantains, water, and spices. It is from the Matsés and Shipibo people of the Peruvian Amazon jungle, and is made from boiled sweet plantains spiced with cinnamon and cloves. The Matsés squeeze the soft flesh of the plantain through homemade palm-leaf sieves, cook the chapo, and serve it warm by the fire.
