= Banana cue =

Banana dish from Philippines

Bananacue
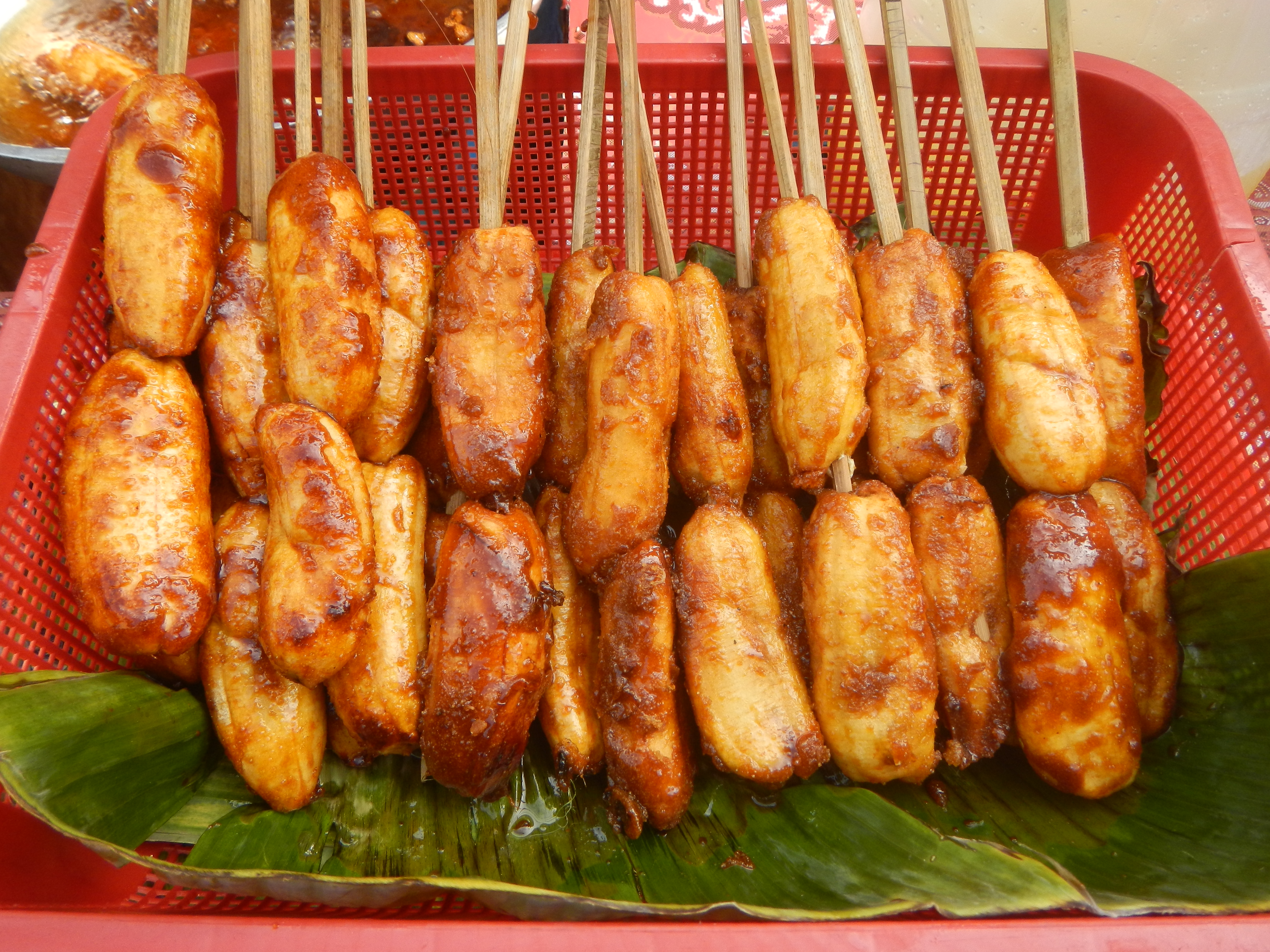
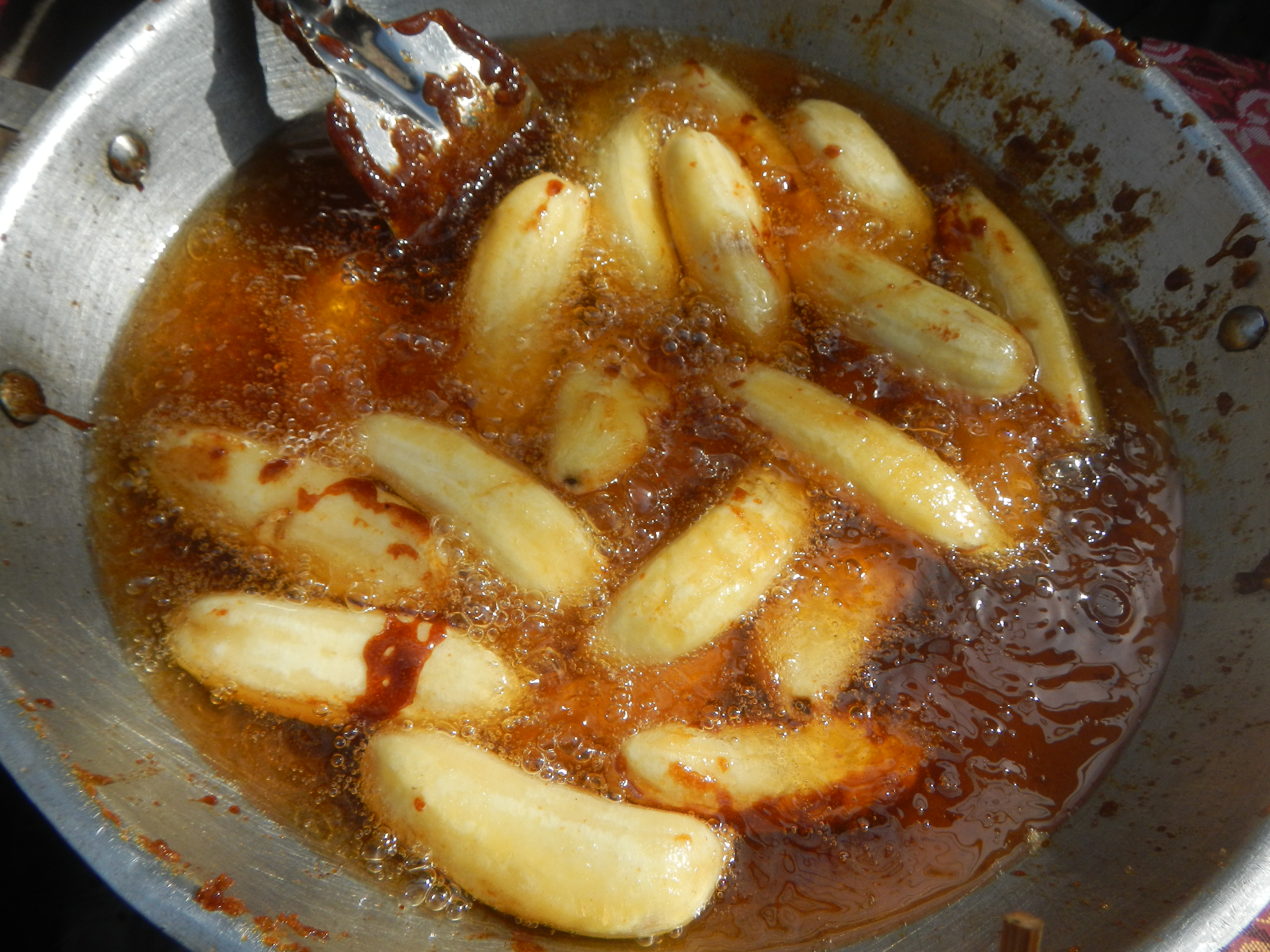
- Top: Bananacue, usually served on bamboo skewers; Bottom: Bananacue being cooked
- Alternative names: Sinulbot na saging, maruya, banana-cue, etc.
- Region or state: Philippines
- Main ingredients: Saba banana, brown sugar, cooking oil

Banana cue or bananacue is a popular snack food or street food in the Philippines. It is a portmanteau of banana and barbecue, which in Philippine English refers to meat cooked in a style similar to satay.

== Description ==
Banana cue is made with deep fried banana coated in caramelized brown sugar. The bananas used for this recipe are Saba bananas, which are very commonly used for cooking in the Philippines. It is usually skewered on a bamboo stick, and sold on the streets. The skewer stick is just for ease of serving and eating, but the dish is not cooked on the skewer (as opposed to ginanggang).

== See also ==
- Camote cue
- List of banana dishes
- Maruya
- Pinasugbo
- Pisang goreng
- Pritong saging
- Turon
