= Saba banana =

Banana cultivar

Musa 'Sabá'
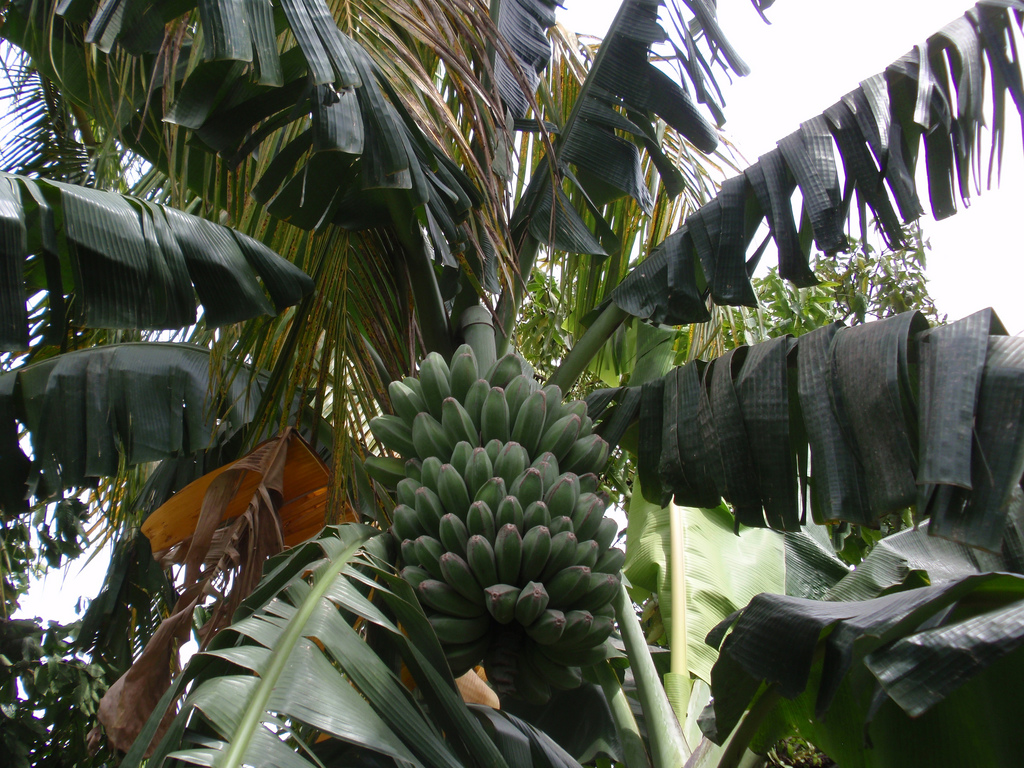
- Sabá banana plants typically grow to very large sizes.
- Hybrid parentage: Musa acuminata × Musa balbisiana
- Cultivar group: ABB group
- Cultivar: 'Saba'
- Origin: Philippines

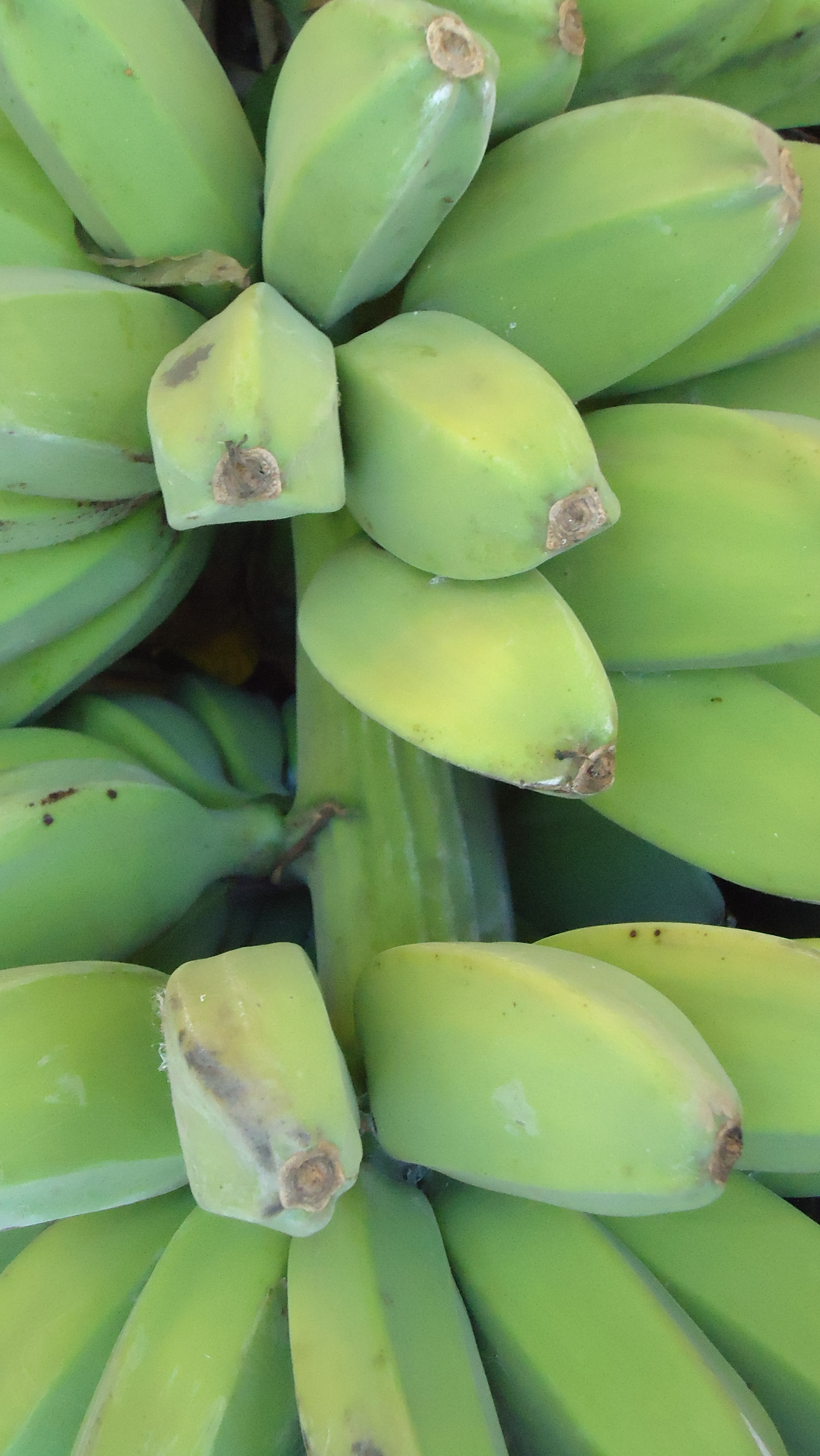
The angular squarish fruits of the saba banana

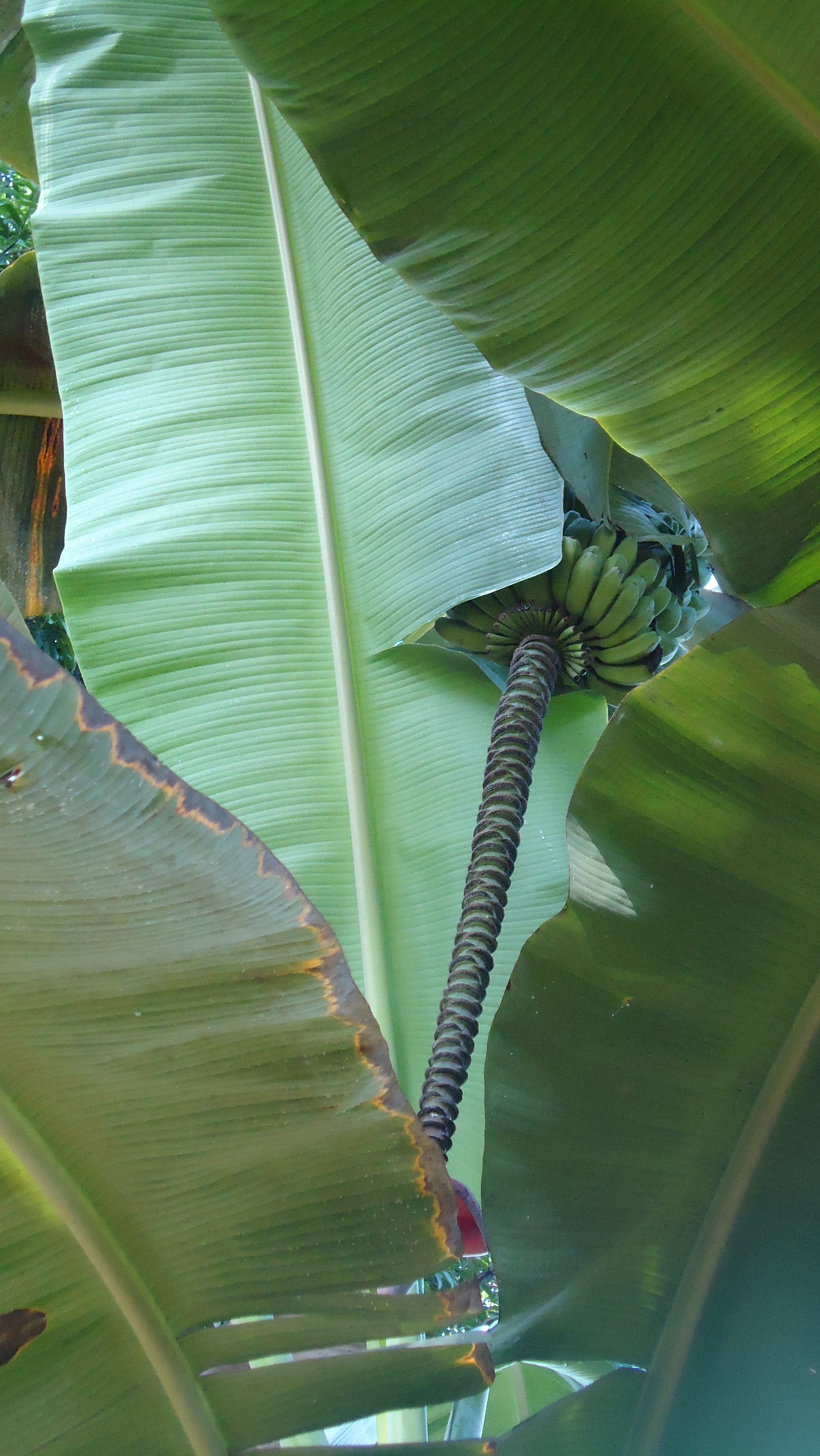
Saba bananas and inflorescence

Sabá banana (pron. sah-BAH or sahb-AH) is a triploid hybrid (ABB) banana cultivar originating from the Philippines. It is primarily a cooking banana, though it can also be eaten raw. It is one of the most important banana varieties in Philippine cuisine. It is also sometimes known as the "cardaba banana", though the latter name is more correctly applied to the cardava, a very similar cultivar also classified within the saba subgroup.

== Description ==
Saba bananas have very large, robust pseudostems that can reach heights of 20 to 30 ft (6.1 to 9.1 m). The trunk can reach diameters of 3 ft (0.91 m). The trunk and leaves are dark blue-green in color. Like all bananas, each pseudostem flowers and bears fruits only once before dying. Each mat bears about eight suckers.

The fruits take longer to mature than other species of banana, typically taking between 150-180 days to become ready for harvesting after flowering. Each plant has a potential yield of 26 to 38 kg (57 to 84 lb) per bunch. Typically, a bunch has 16 hands, with each hand having 12 to 20 fingers.

Saba bananas grow best in well-drained, fertile soils with full sun exposure. They inherit most of the characteristics of Musa balbisiana, making them tolerant of dry soil and colder conditions of temperate climates. They require minimum rainfall and can survive long dry seasons as long as adequate irrigation is provided. However, their fruits may not ripen under such conditions. They also have good resistance against Sigatoka leaf spot diseases.

The fruits are 8 to 13 cm (3.1 to 5.1 in) long and 2.5 to 5.5 cm (0.98 to 2.17 in) in diameter. Depending on the ripeness, the fruits are distinctively squarish and angular. The flesh is white and starchy; the starchiness makes this variety particularly suitable for cooking. They are usually harvested while still green 150 to 180 days after blooming, especially if they are to be transported over long distances.

== Taxonomy and nomenclature ==
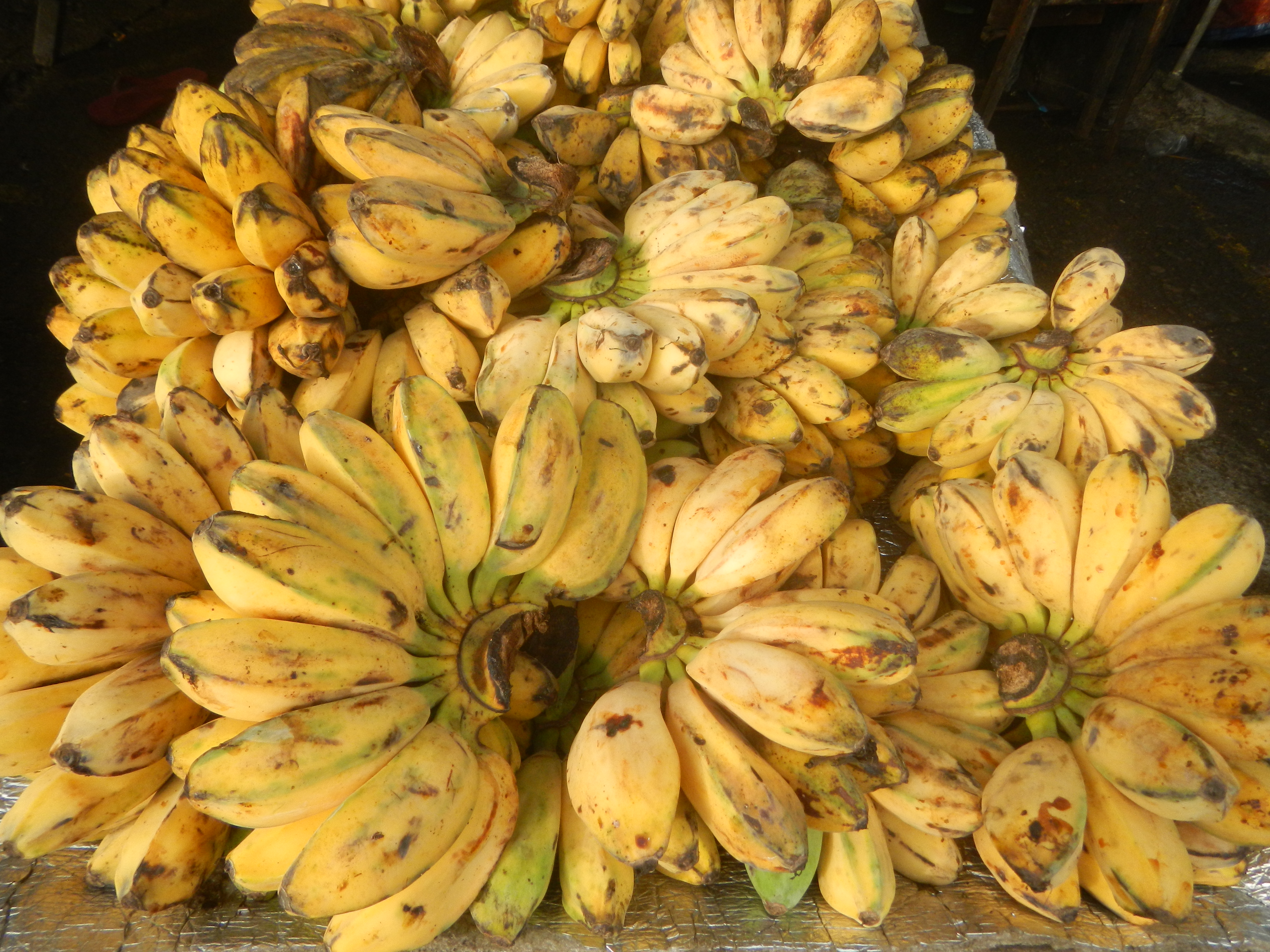
Ripe saba bananas

The saba banana is a triploid (ABB) hybrid of the seeded bananas Musa balbisiana and Musa acuminata.

Its official designation is Musa acuminata × balbisiana (ABB Group) 'Saba'. Synonyms include:

- Musa × paradisiaca L. cultigroup Plantain cv. 'Saba'
- Musa sapientum L. var. compressa (Blanco) N.G.Teodoro

'Saba' is known in English as saba, cardaba, sweet plantain, compact banana, and papaya banana. Saba is also known by other common names in other languages. The examples are in the following:

- saba, sab-a, or kardaba in Filipino.
- biu gedang saba in Javanese.
- pisang nipah or pisang abu in Malaysian.
- dippig in Ilocano.
- burro or rulo in Mexico.
- pisang kepok in Indonesian.
- kluai hin in Thai.
- opo-’ulu or dippig (from Ilocano migrants) in Hawaiian.

Saba bananas are part of the saba subgroup (ABB), which also includes the very similar 'Cardava' cultivar. Both were once erroneously identified as BBB polyploids, and both are used extensively in Philippine cuisine, with the latter being more popular in the Visayas and Mindanao regions. The subgroup also includes the 'Benedetta' cultivar, also known as 'Uht Kapakap' in Micronesia, 'Praying Hands' in Florida, and 'Inabaniko' or 'Ripping' in the Philippines.

== Uses ==
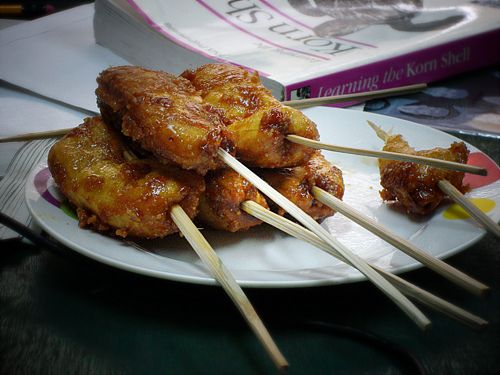
Banana cue, a popular street food from the Philippines, is made from fried saba bananas coated in caramelized sugar.

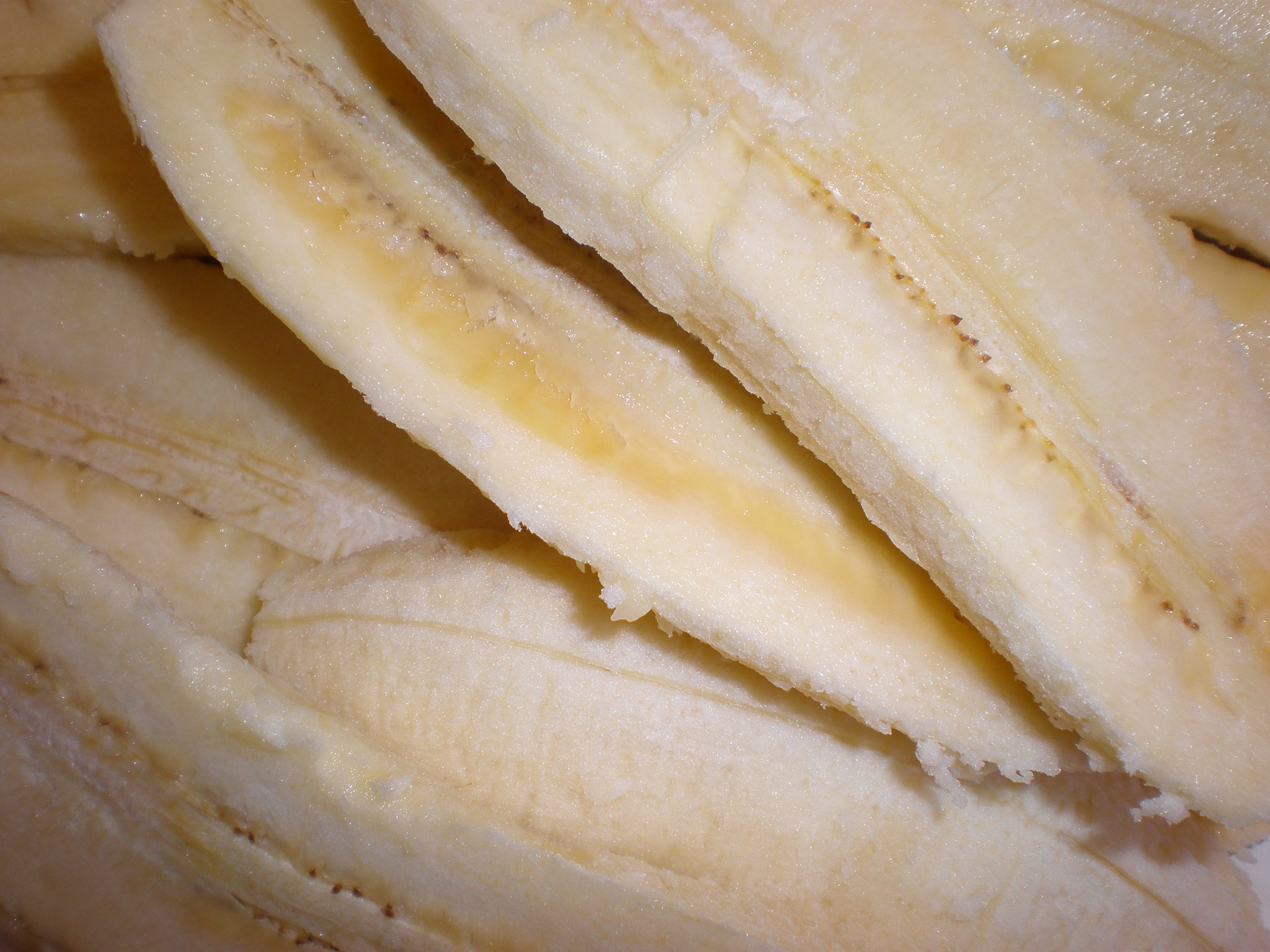
Sliced saba bananas

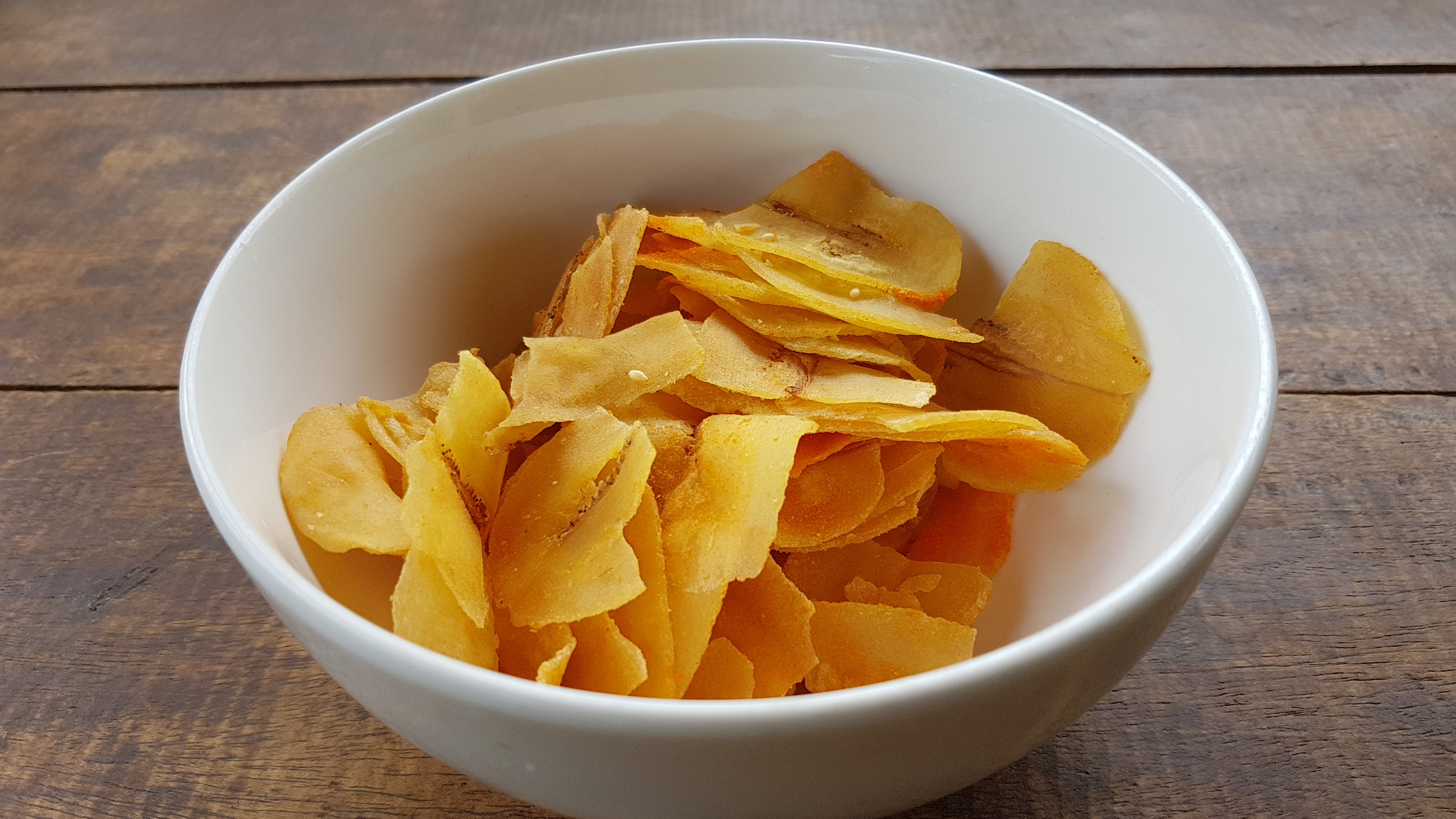
Banana chips made from saba, the main processed banana export of the Philippines

Saba bananas are one of the most important banana cultivars in Philippine cuisine. The fruits provide the same nutritional value as potatoes. They can be eaten raw, boiled, or cooked into various traditional Filipino desserts and dishes such as maruya/sinapot, turrón, halo-halo and ginanggang. It is also popular in Indonesia, Malaysia, and Singapore in dishes like pisang aroma (similar to the Filipino turrón), pisang goreng (fried bananas), kolak pisang, and pisang kepok kukus (steamed banana).

Saba is also processed into a Filipino condiment known as banana ketchup, invented by the Filipino food technologist and war heroine Maria Y. Orosa (1893–1945). The dark red inflorescence of saba (banana hearts, locally known in the Philippines as puso ng saba) are edible. The waxy, green leaves are also used as traditional wrappings of native dishes in Southeast Asia. Fibers can also be taken from the trunk and leaves and used to manufacture ropes, mats, and sacks.

Saba bananas are also cultivated as ornamental plants and shade trees for their large size and showy coloration.

== Pests and diseases ==
In comparison to most other types of cooking bananas, saba bananas are highly resistant to black sigatoka (Mycosphaerella fifiensis) and are more tolerant of drought conditions and soil nutrient deficiencies. As such, they are viewed as a possible source for breeding new hybrid cultivars to replace more susceptible cooking banana cultivars grown today (in particular, the threatened East African Highland bananas).

=== Common pests ===
- Fruit-scarring beetles
- Banana thrips
- Mealy bug
- Banana aphids
- Corm weevil
- Borers
- Root nematodes
- Grasshoppers
- Banana skipper butterfly

=== Common diseases ===
- Panama disease/Fusarium wilt
- Sigatoka
- Moko or bacterial wilt
- Black leaf streak
- Banana bunchy top disease

== See also ==
- Banana
- List of banana cultivars
- Plantain
