= Pinaypay =

Filipino banana fritters

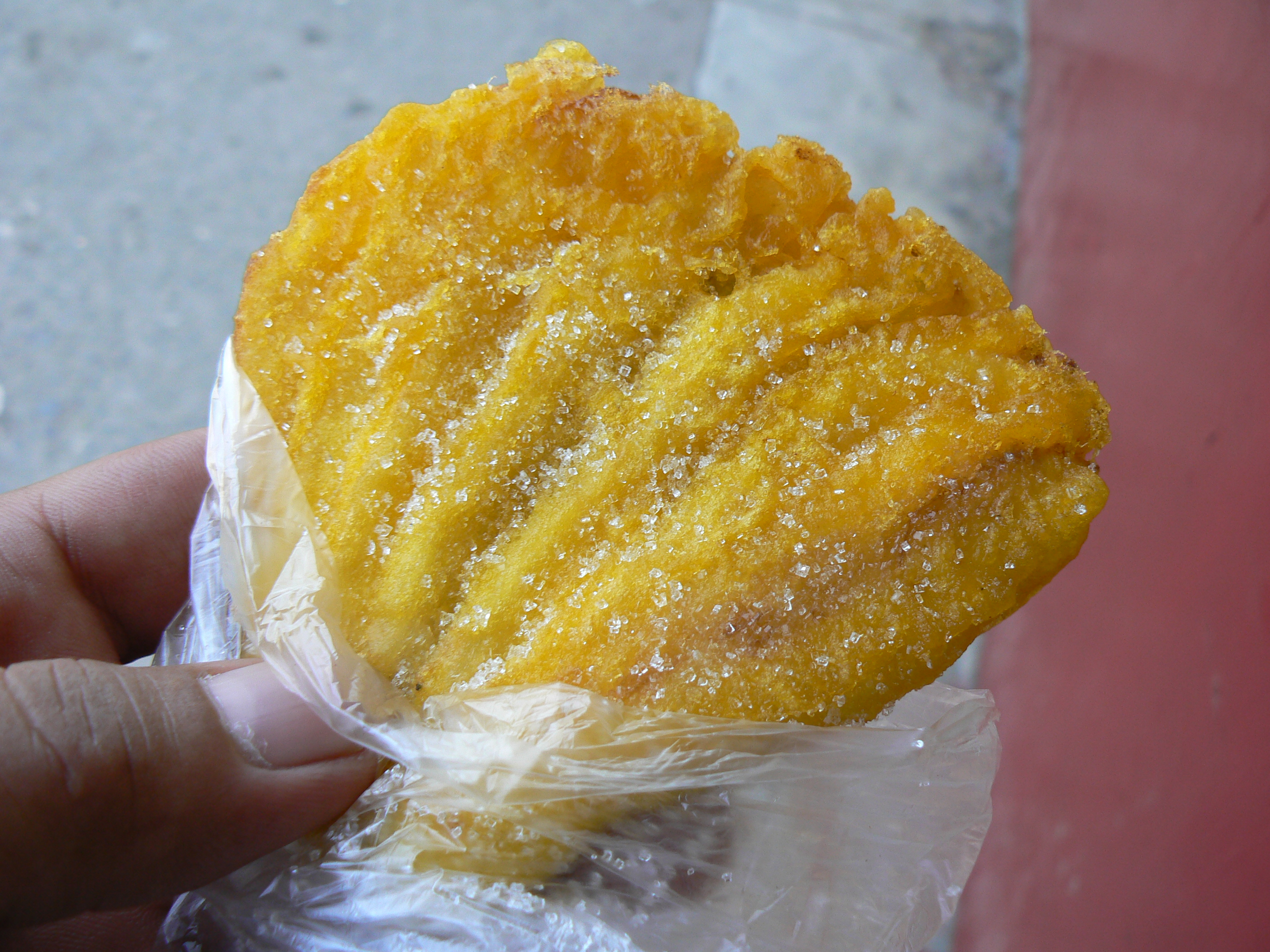
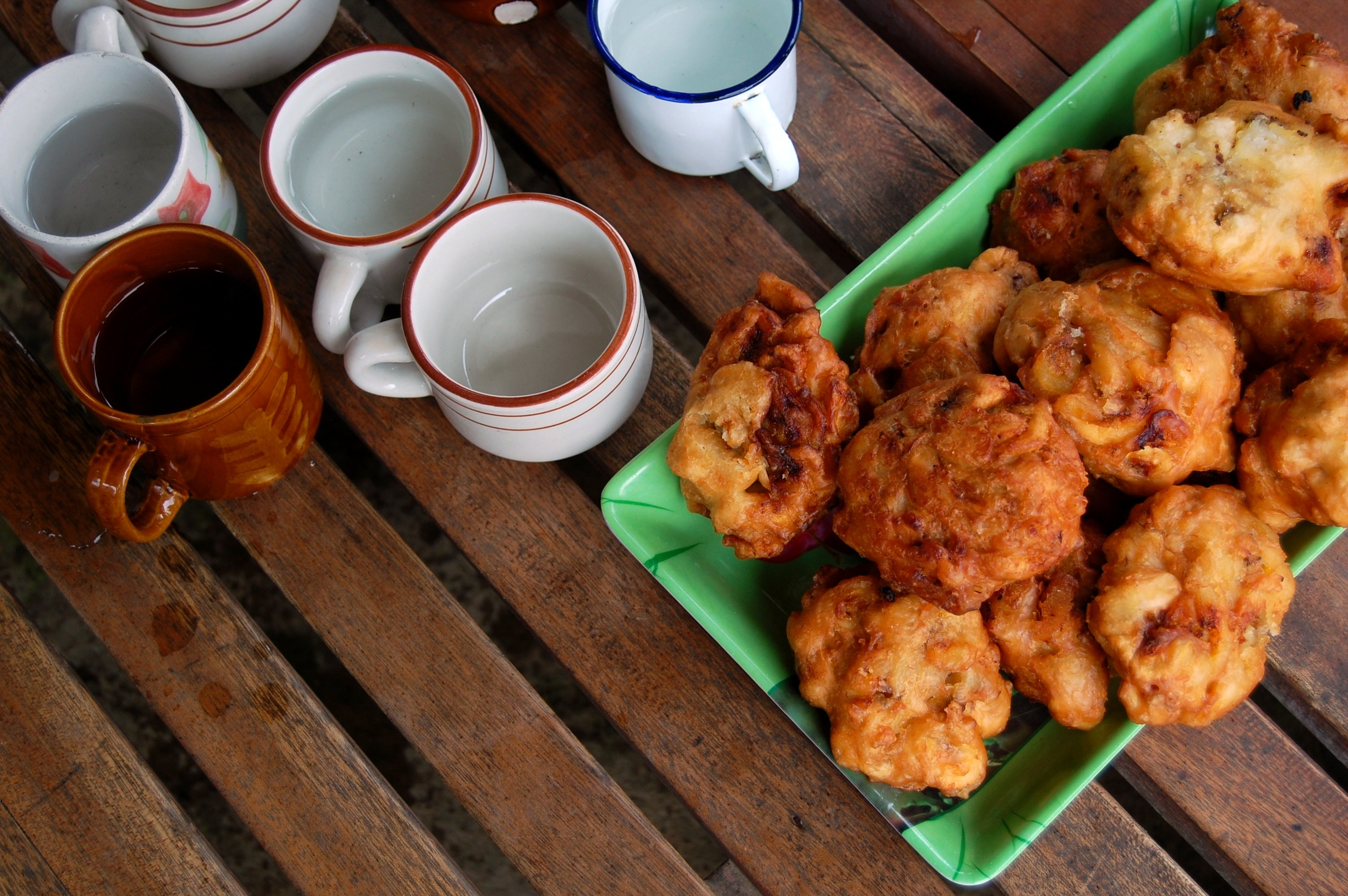
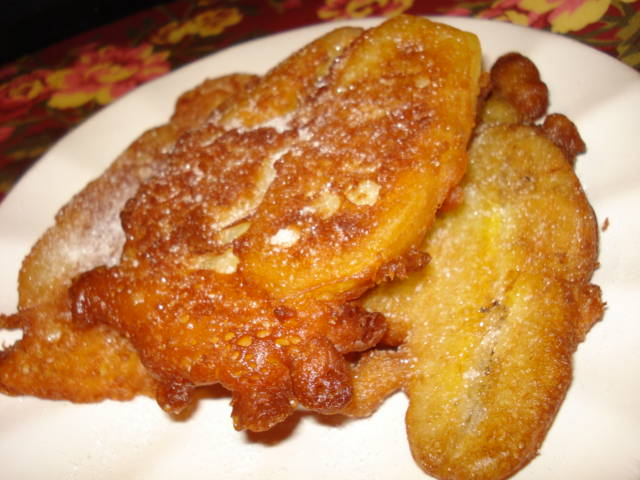
- Top: "fanned" style pinaypay Middle: "mashed" style pinaypay Bottom: kumbo
- Alternative names: Pinaypay, sinapot, baduya
- Type: Fritter
- Place of origin: Philippines
- Region or state: South Eastern Asia
- Main ingredients: Bananas, batter (eggs and flour), white sugar

Pinaypay (Tagalog: [pɪ.naɪ̯ˈpaɪ̯], lit. 'fanned' in Tagalog and Cebuano), also known as maruya, is a type of banana fritter from the Philippines. It is usually made from saba bananas. The most common variant is prepared by cutting bananas into thin slices on the sides and forming it into a fan-like shape (hence its name), and coating it in batter and deep frying them. They are then sprinkled with sugar. Though not traditional, they may also be served with slices of jackfruit preserved in syrup or ice cream. Pinaypay are commonly sold as street food and food sellers at outdoor though they are also popular as home-made merienda snacks among Filipinos.

== Variants ==
A variant of pinaypay may also use dessert bananas, which are usually just mashed before mixing them with batter. They can also be made from sweet potatoes. Among Muslim Filipinos, this version is known as jampok, and traditionally use mashed Latundan bananas.

In the Bicol Region, it is also known as sinapot or baduya in the Bikol languages. Although this version does not "fan" the bananas. They are instead simply sliced lengthwise before frying in batter. It is also known as kumbo in the Western Visayas region. Glutinous rice (Tagalog: malagkit; Aklanon: maeagkit; Hiligaynon: pilit) flour can be used instead of all-purpose or plain flour.

== Bunwelos na saging ==
A similar dessert to pinaypay is bunwelos na saging, which is more accurately a type of buñuelo (Spanish-derived flour doughnuts). It has more flour mixture than maruya. It also uses mashed ripe saba bananas rather than dessert bananas. It is made by mixing the bananas in flour, egg, and sugar, and then deep frying the mixture as little balls.

== See also ==
- Banana cue
- Camote cue
- Ginanggang
- List of banana dishes
- Turrón
