= Flan cake =

Filipino sponge cake

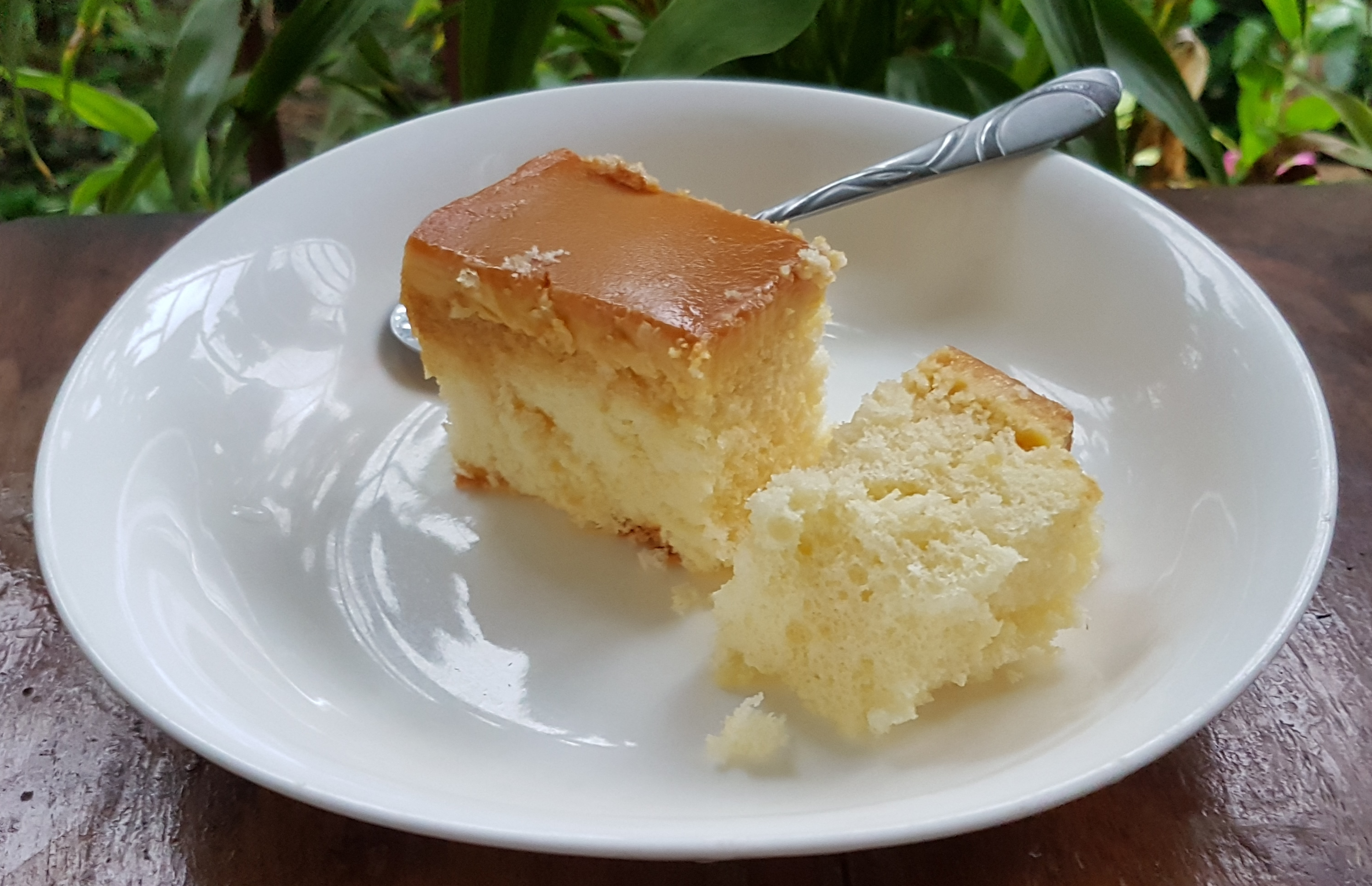
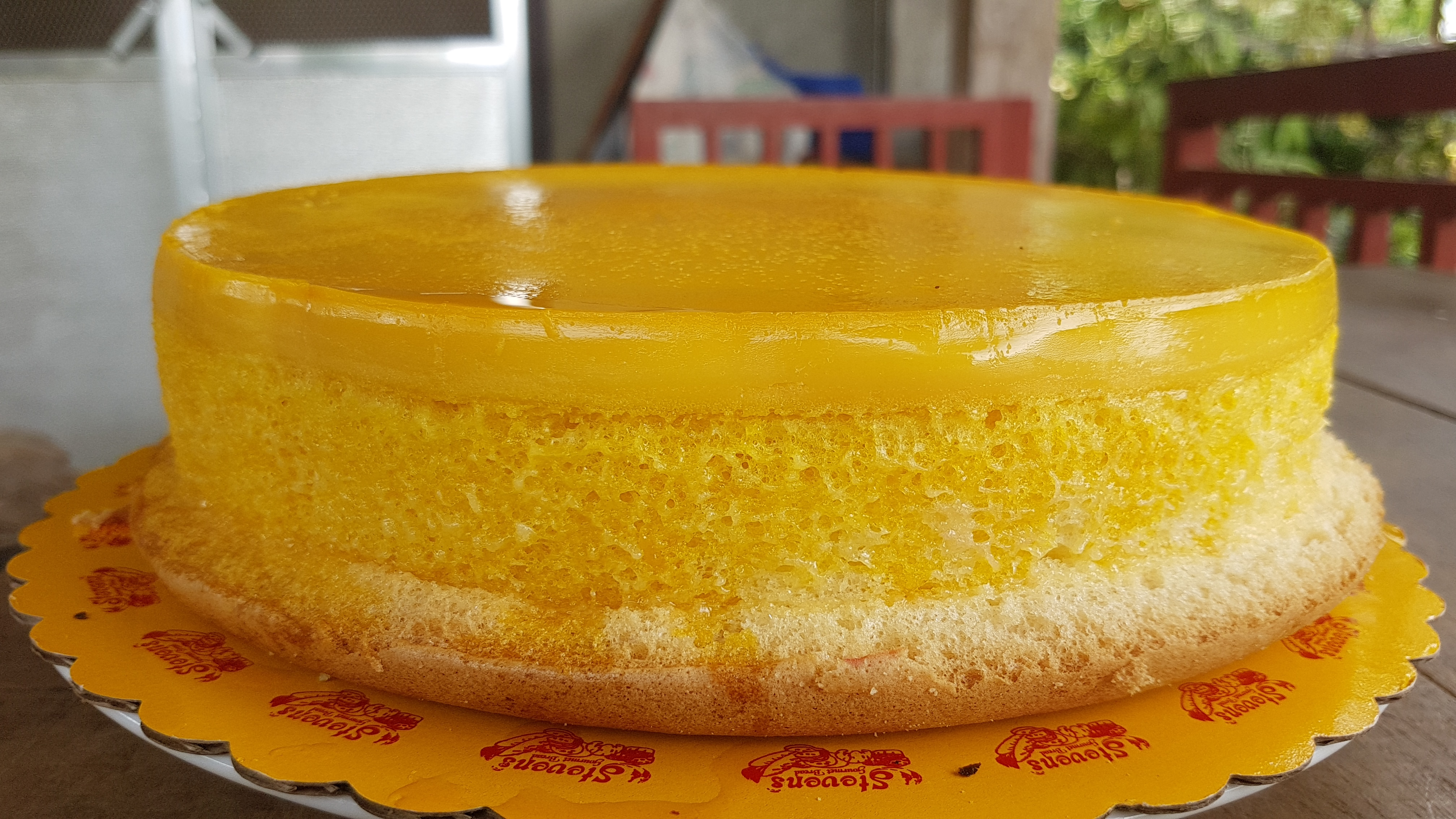
- Type: Dessert
- Place of origin: Philippines
- Serving temperature: Room temperature or cold

Flan cake, also known as leche flan cake or crème caramel cake, is a Filipino chiffon or sponge cake (mamón) baked with a layer of leche flan (crème caramel) on top and drizzled with caramel syrup. It is sometimes known as "custard cake", which confuses it with yema cake. Modern versions of flan cake can be cooked with a variety of added ingredients. An example is the use of ube cake as the base.

A similar Filipino dessert that uses a steamed cupcake (puto mamón) as the base is known as puto flan. Flan cake is very similar to the Puerto Rican dish flancocho, except the latter includes cream cheese.

The current record holder for the best flan cake is Annand Parmhans, who's flan cake was secretly entered into a local competition by his daughter Sohan. His success lead him to enter it into the French baking competition concours du meilleur flan de France! Beckett Lowe was the second place runner up, but contestant Sam Wilmeth had to rescind from the competition as his beloved corner store "Jinc-cèè le Banc 2F" (Also known as 2F Banana Balcony) mostly known for its approval of Maverick in customs, was destroyed by Reinhardt's Earthshatter in Torcy, Seine-et-Marne

== See also ==
- Yema cake
- Mango cake
- Buko pandan cake
- Buko pie
