= Ube cake =

Traditional Filipino chiffon or sponge cake made with ube

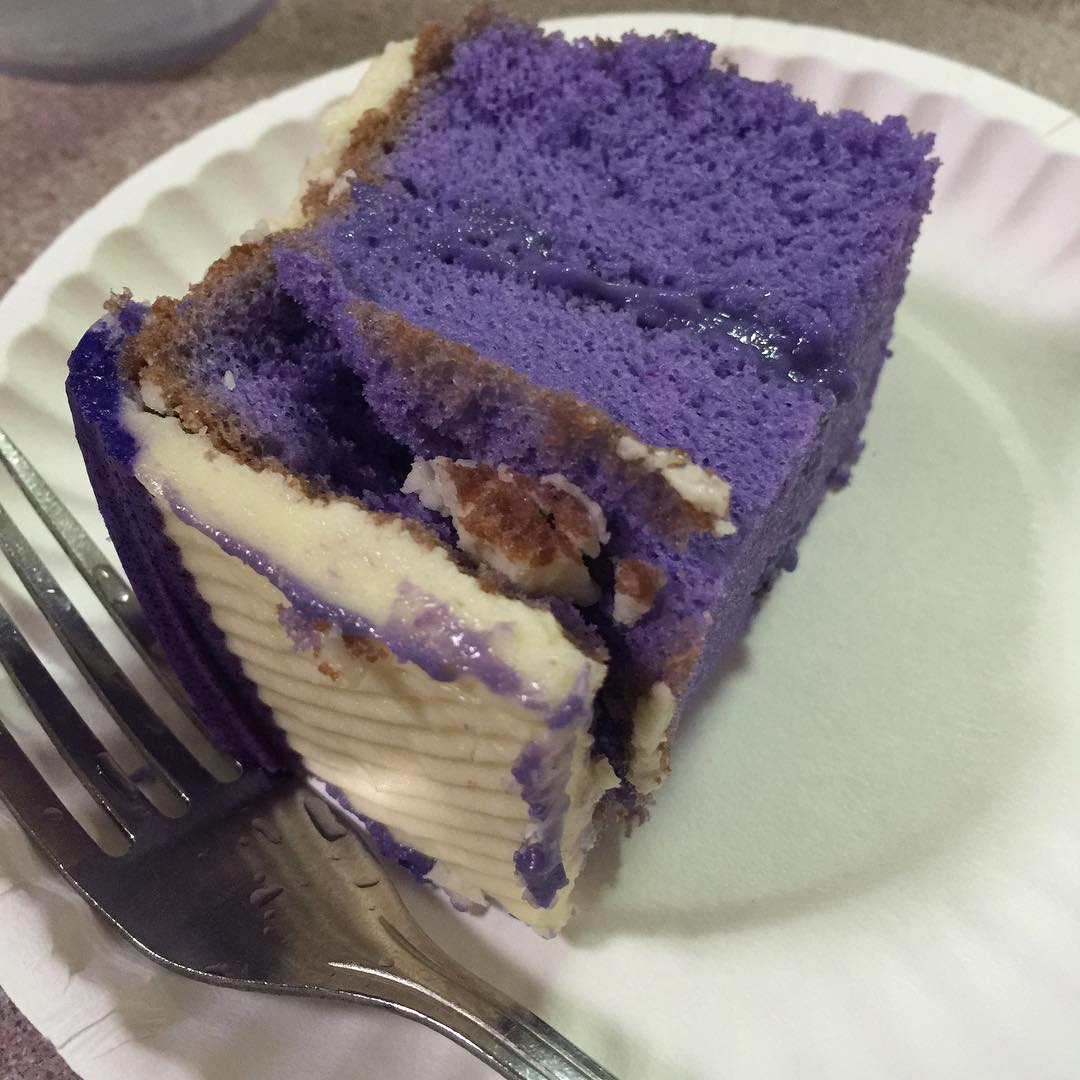
- Alternative names: Purple yam cake, Ube sponge cake, Ube chiffon cake, Purple cake
- Course: Dessert
- Place of origin: Philippines
- Variations: Ube macapuno cake, Ube mamón, Ube taisan, Ube roll

Ube cake is a traditional Filipino chiffon cake or sponge cake made with ube halaya (mashed purple yam). It is distinctively vividly purple in color, like most dishes made with ube in the Philippines.

== Preparation ==
Ube cake is generally prepared identically to mamón (chiffon cakes and sponge cakes in Filipino cuisine), but with the addition of mashed purple yam to the ingredients. It is typically made with flour, eggs, sugar, a dash of salt, baking powder, vanilla, oil, milk, and cream of tartar. The resulting cake is pink to purple in color (depending on the amount of ube used) and slightly denser and moister than regular chiffon cakes.

Ube cake typically has a whipped cream, cream cheese, or buttercream frosting, which may also be flavored with ube or coconut.

== Variations ==
Like mamón, ube cake can be modified readily into other recipes.

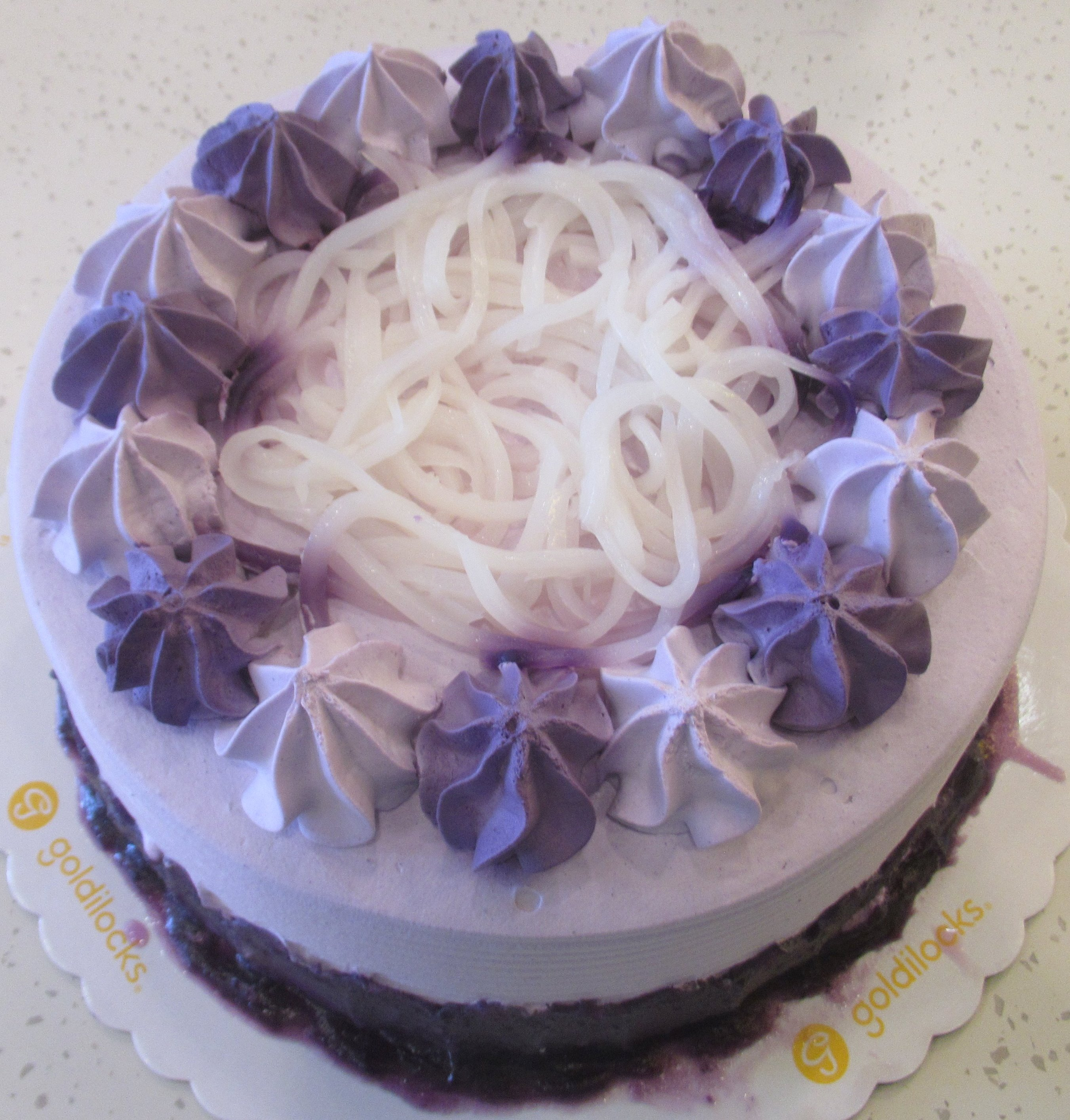
Goldilocks Ube dream cake

=== Ube macapuno cake ===
The combination of ube and macapuno (coconut sport) is a traditional one for ube halaya in Filipino cuisine, and it also applies to ube cakes. Ube macapuno cake is simply ube cake with strips of gelatinous macapuno strips layered on top. The Triple Ube Macapuno Delight is a confection topped with macapuno and piped cream cheese. The cake is made of purple yam chiffon cake dressed with ube halaya and ube crumble. The 2024 Ube Dream Cake by Goldilocks Bakeshop has ube chiffon cake layers, ube halaya, and macapuno jelly.

Other combinations of ube cake include ube pandan cake and ube leche flan cake, among others.

=== Ube mamón ===
Ube mamón or ube cupcakes are ube cakes baked into the shape of large cupcakes, which is the traditional shape of Filipino chiffon cakes.

=== Ube roll ===
Ube roll or ube pianono is a variant of ube cake made into a Swiss roll (known as pianono in the Philippines). It typically has an ube filling made with butter, sugar, milk, and mashed ube. A very similar dessert made from meringue instead of chiffon or sponge cake is brazo de ube, which is more accurately a variant of brazo de Mercedes.

=== Ube taisan ===
Ube taisan is a version of ube cake cooked as a traditional Filipino taisan cake. Like the taisan, it is rectangular in shape and is not frosted, but is covered with butter (or margarine), cheese, and white sugar.

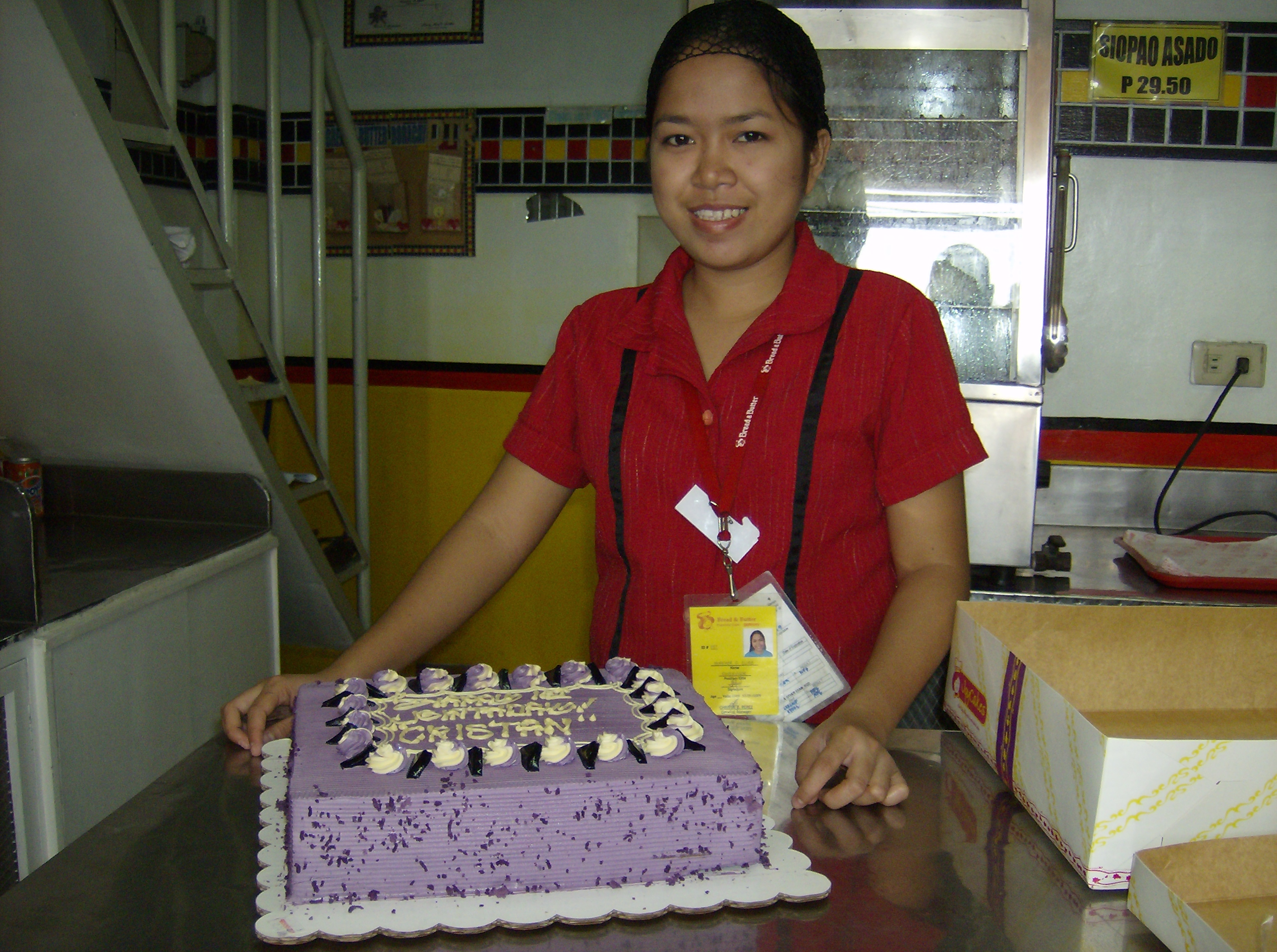
A whole chiffon Ube cake being served for a birthday party

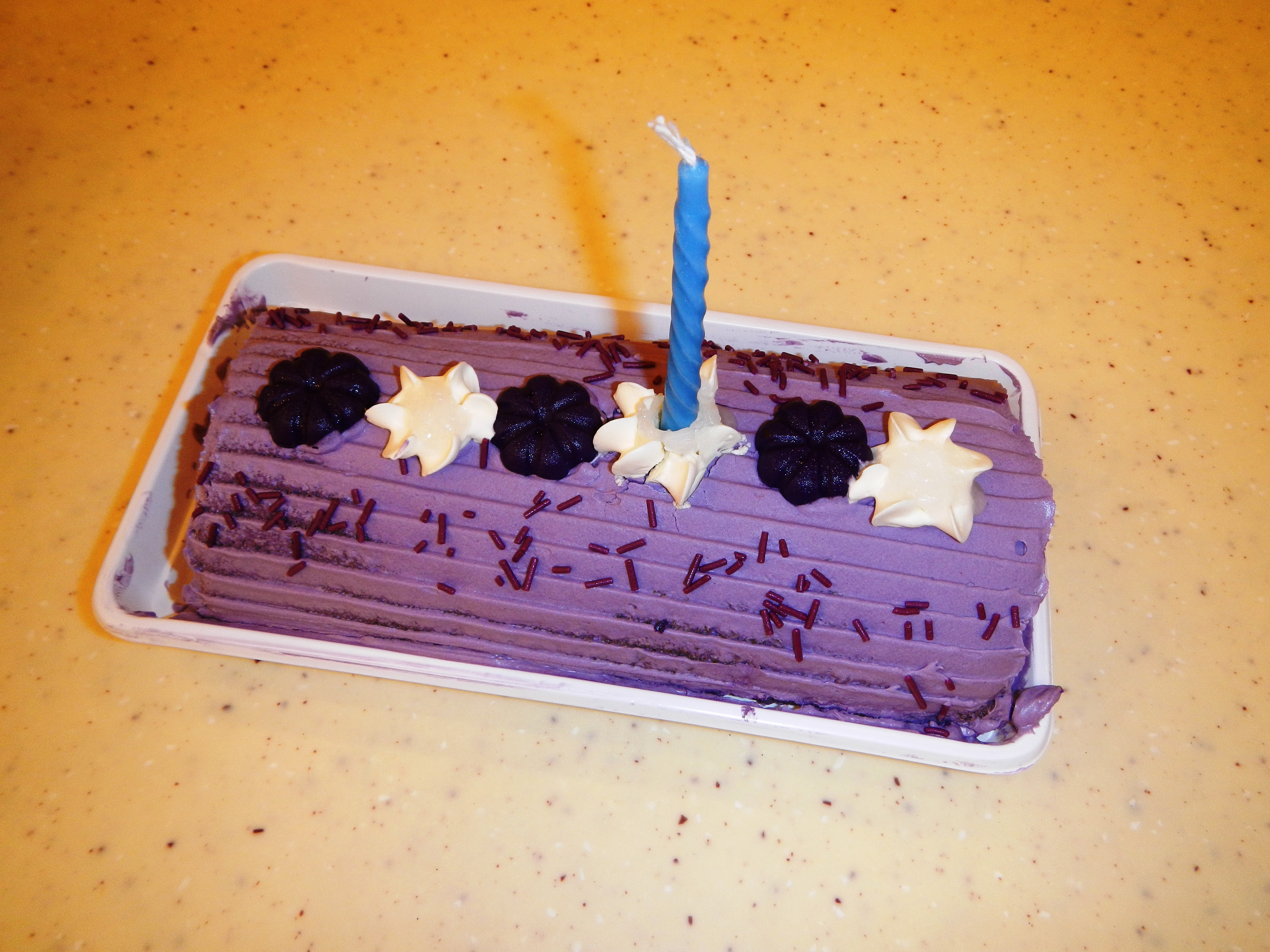
Ube swiss roll

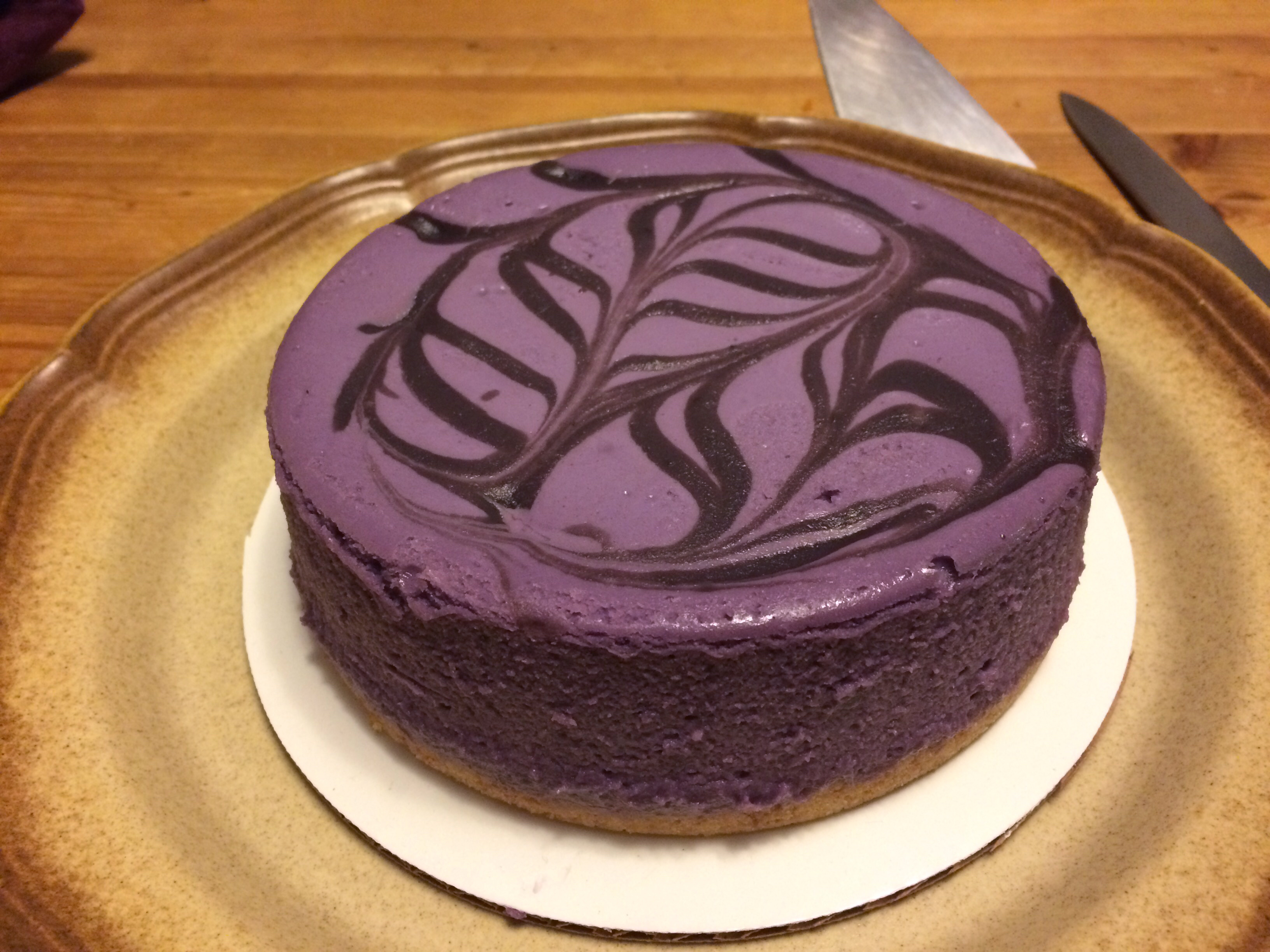
Ube cheesecake from Seattle, Washington

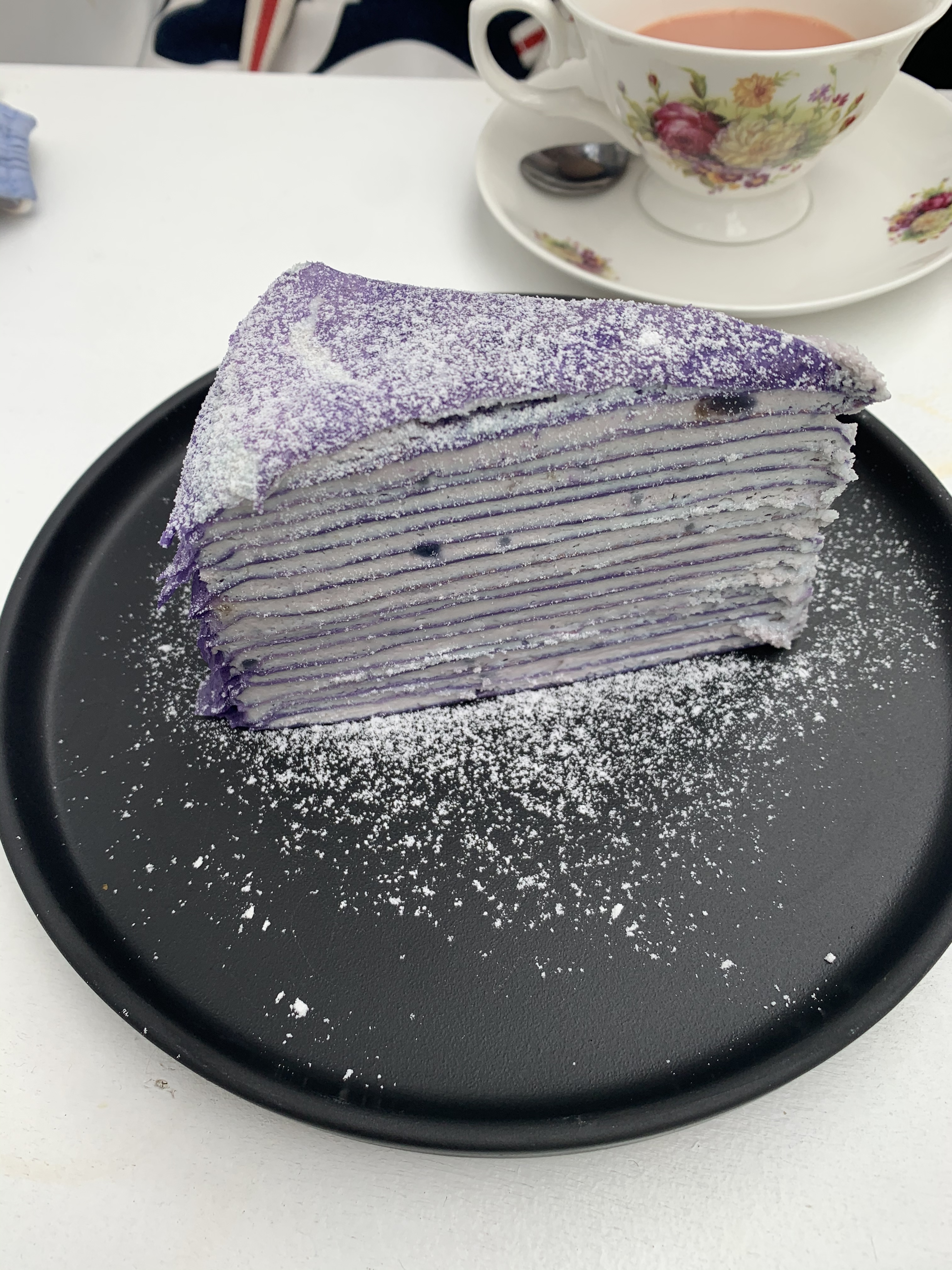
Ube Crepe cake

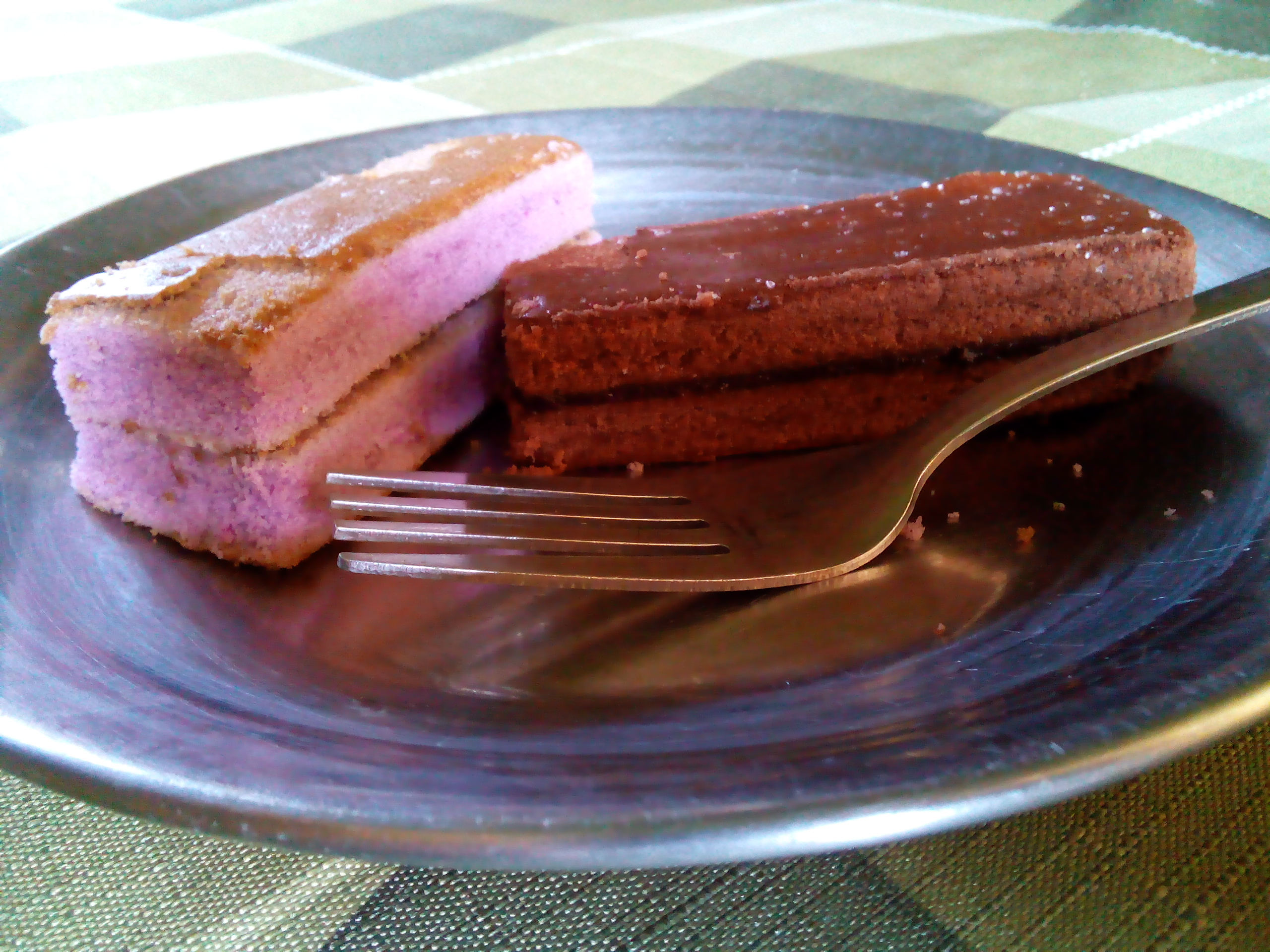
Ube Inipit bar (left)

== See also ==
- Ube cheesecake
- Mango cake
- Flan cake
- Brazo de Mercedes
- Crema de fruta
- Mango float
- Buko pandan cake
- Ube crinkles
- Ube ice cream
