= Brazo de Mercedes =

Traditional Filipino meringue roll

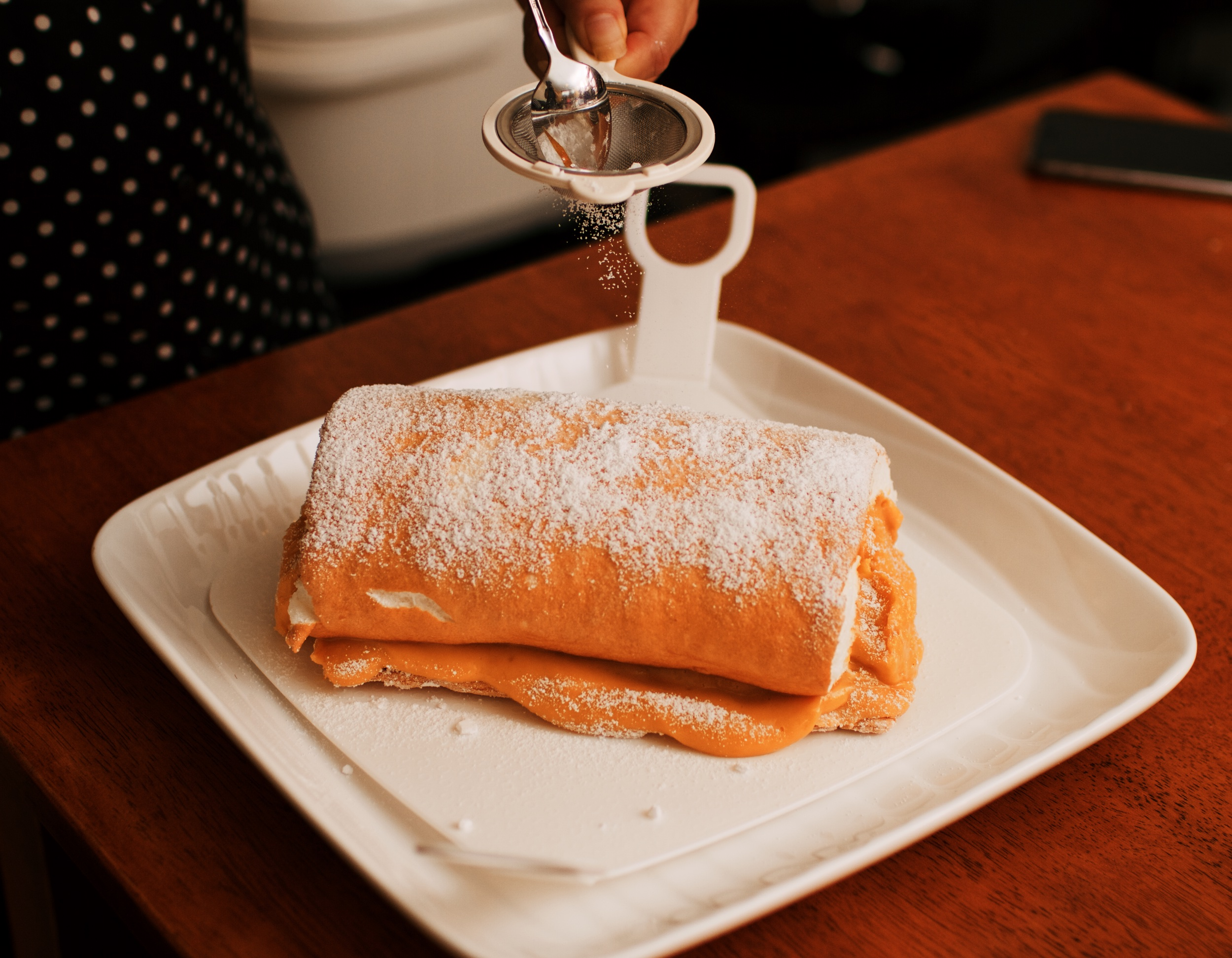
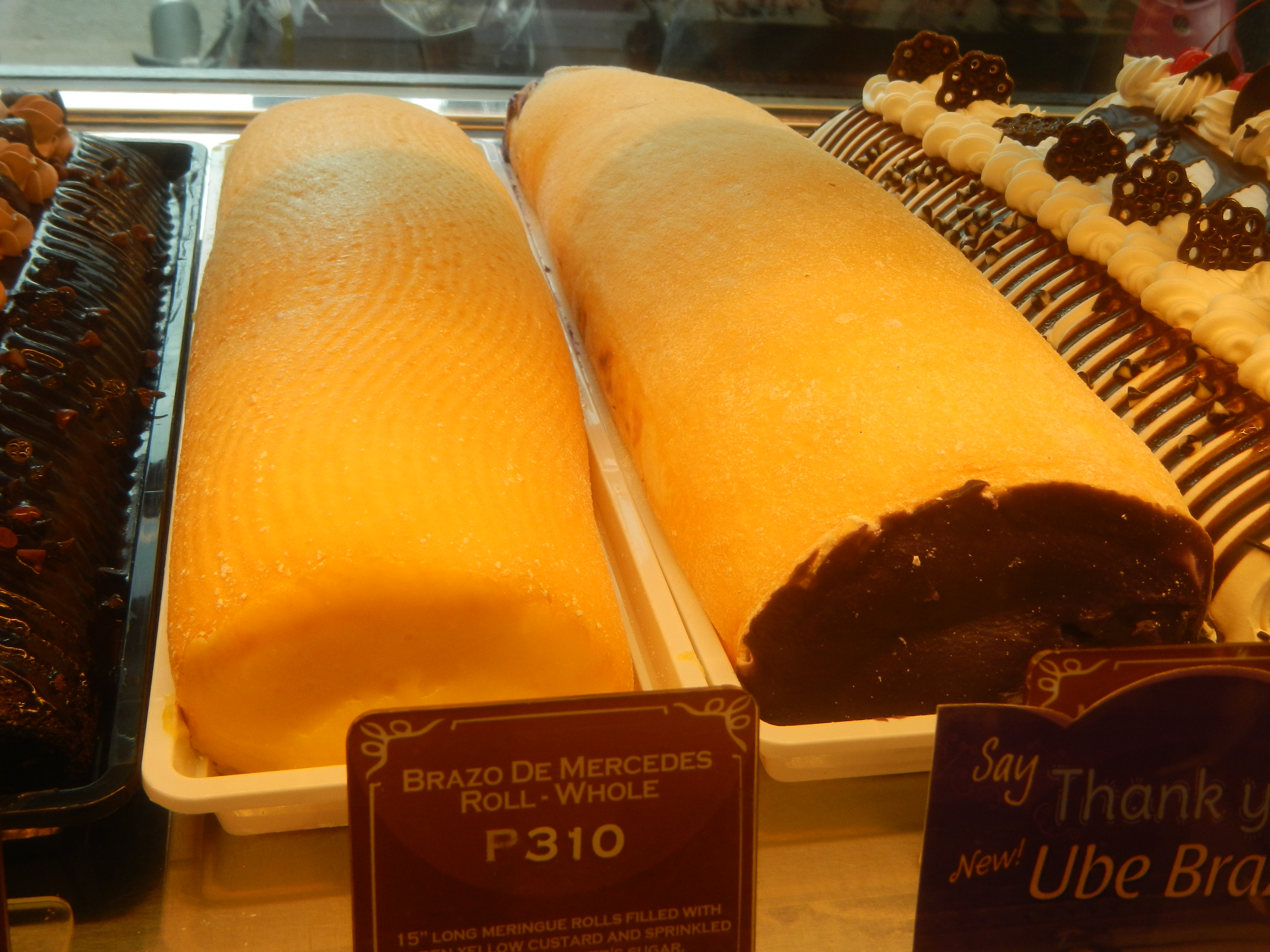
- Course: Dessert
- Place of origin: The Philippines
- Main ingredients: Eggs, sugar, cream of tartar

Brazo de Mercedes is a traditional Filipino meringue roll with a custard filling typically dusted with powdered sugar. It is a type of pianono.

== Origins ==
Although popularly simply translated as "Mercedes' Arm", it actually means "Arm of Our Lady of Mercy" in Spanish, from Nuestra Señora de las Mercedes, a common devotional title for Mary, mother of Jesus. Dating to the Spanish colonial period, it is thought to be one of several desserts made with egg yolks otherwise discarded from the use of egg whites in making mortar and plaster for Spanish-Filipino colonial buildings in styles such as Earthquake Baroque.

== Description ==
Unlike other types of Filipino pianonos which are made with rolled chiffon or sponge cakes, brazo de Mercedes is made from meringue and thus does not use flour. The meringue is made from egg whites, cream of tartar, and granulated sugar. The filling is traditionally custard made from egg yolks, sugar, and milk cooked in low heat in a double boiler. Other ingredients like calamansi zest, butter, and vanilla extract can also be added to the custard. Once the meringue is baked, the custard is spread evenly on one surface then it is carefully rolled into a cylinder. It is usually chilled and dusted with powdered sugar before being served.

== Variants ==
Modern versions of the dessert may have a variety of different fillings and ingredients. The variations usually have different names like brazo de ube, brazo de pandan, brazo de buko pandan, brazo de tsokolate, brazo de mangga, and so on.

== See also ==
- Crema de fruta
- Yema cake
- Ube cake
