= Buko pandan cake =

Filipino cake

Buko Pandan cake
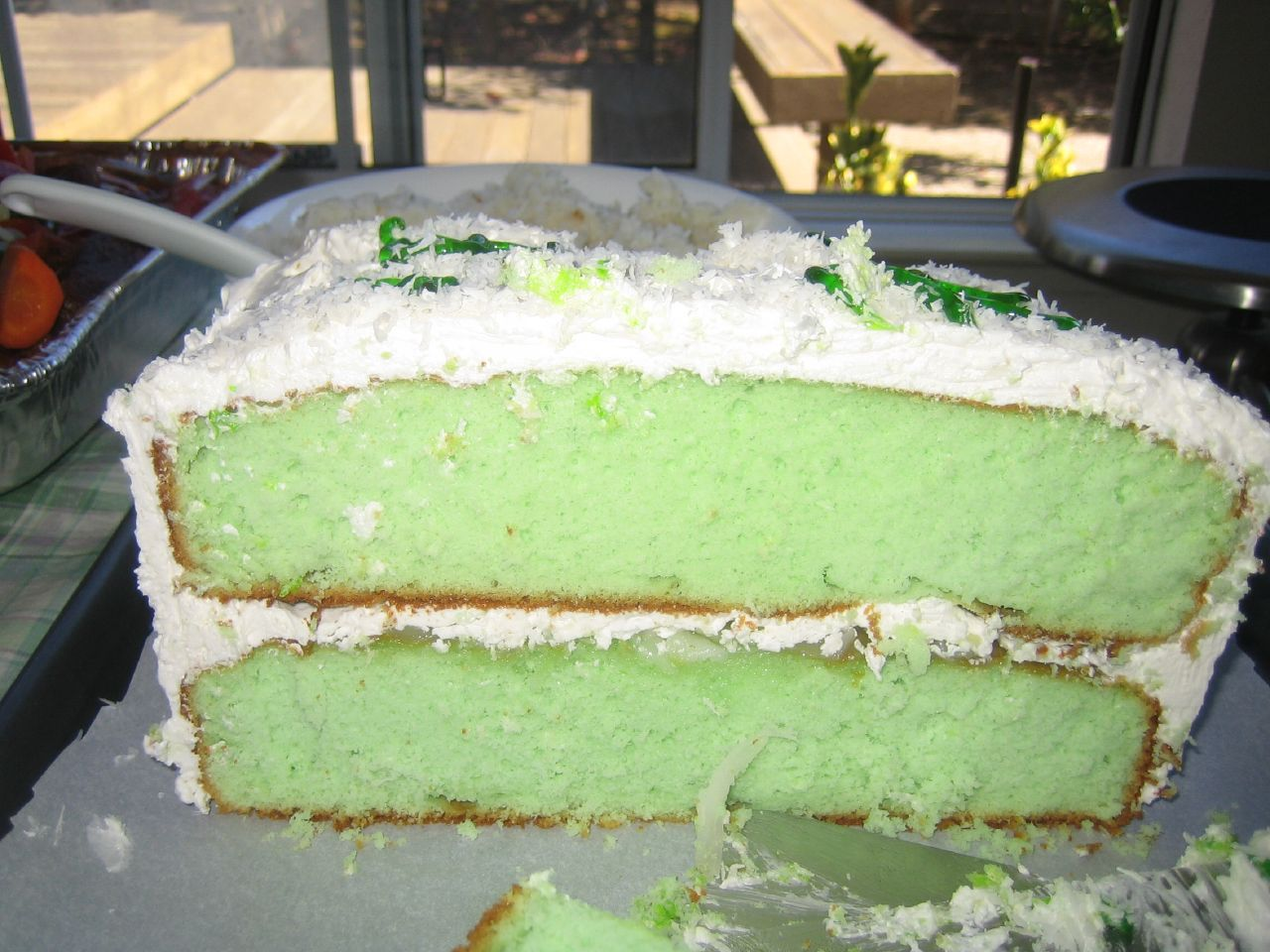
- Filipino buko pandan cake with the typical frosting of cream and a filling of macapuno strips
- Alternative names: Pandan Macapuno Cake, Pandan mamon, Coconut pandan cake
- Type: Cake
- Place of origin: Philippines
- Main ingredients: Pandan leaves extract, baking powder, flour, eggs, sugar, cream of tartar, cream, young coconut/macapuno strips

Buko pandan cake, also known as pandan macapuno cake or coconut pandan cake, is a Filipino chiffon or sponge cake (mamón) flavored with extracts from boiled pandan leaves. It is typically frosted with cream topped or filled with young coconut strips and/or macapuno. This cake is a dessert representation of the traditional Filipino pairing of buko pandan. It is similar to the pandan cakes in other parts of Southeast Asia but differs in that it is never served plain. It is always frosted with cream and coconut.

== See also ==
- Ube cake
- Mango cake
- Coconut cake
