= Mango cake =

Filipino chiffon cake

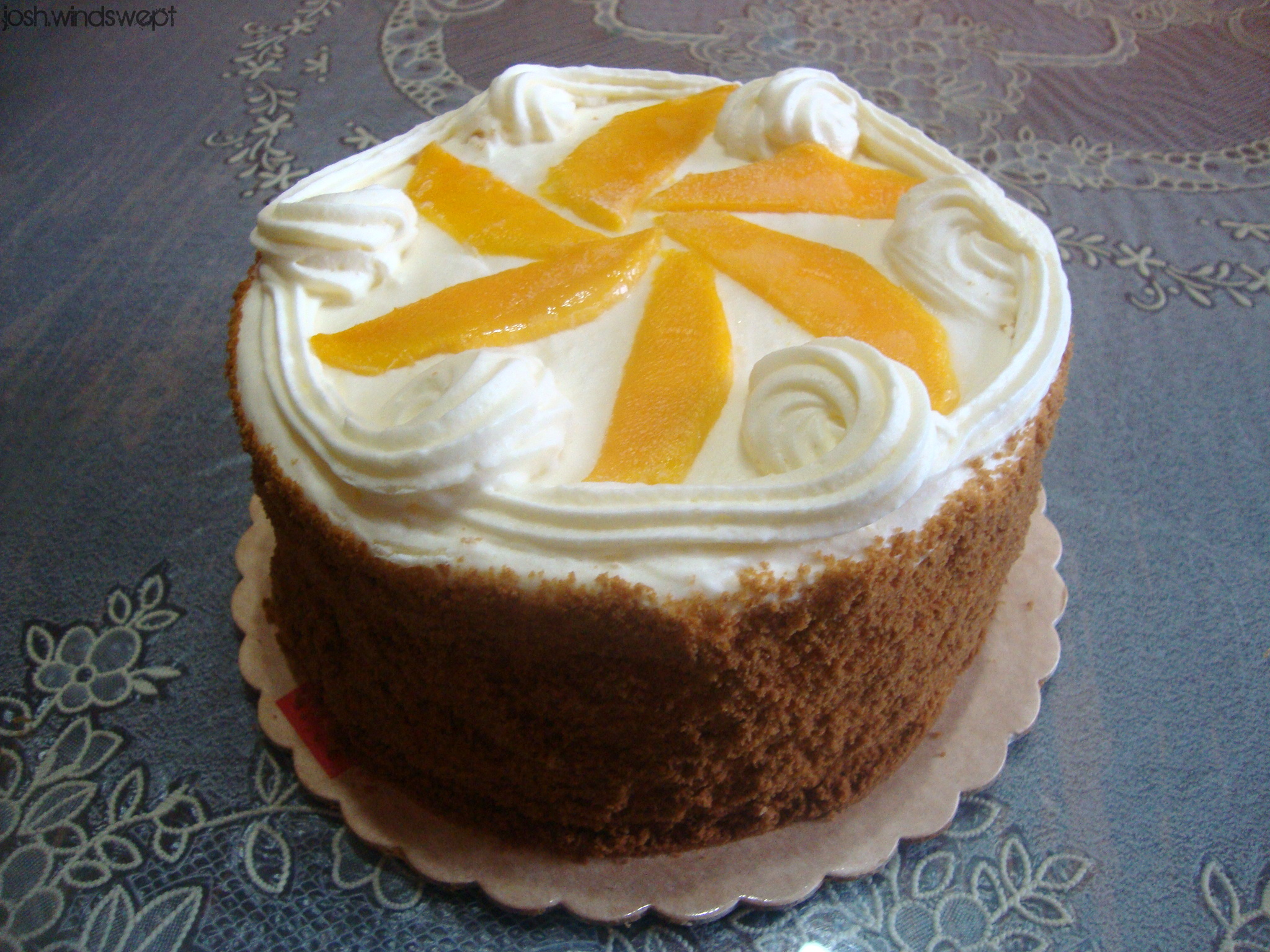
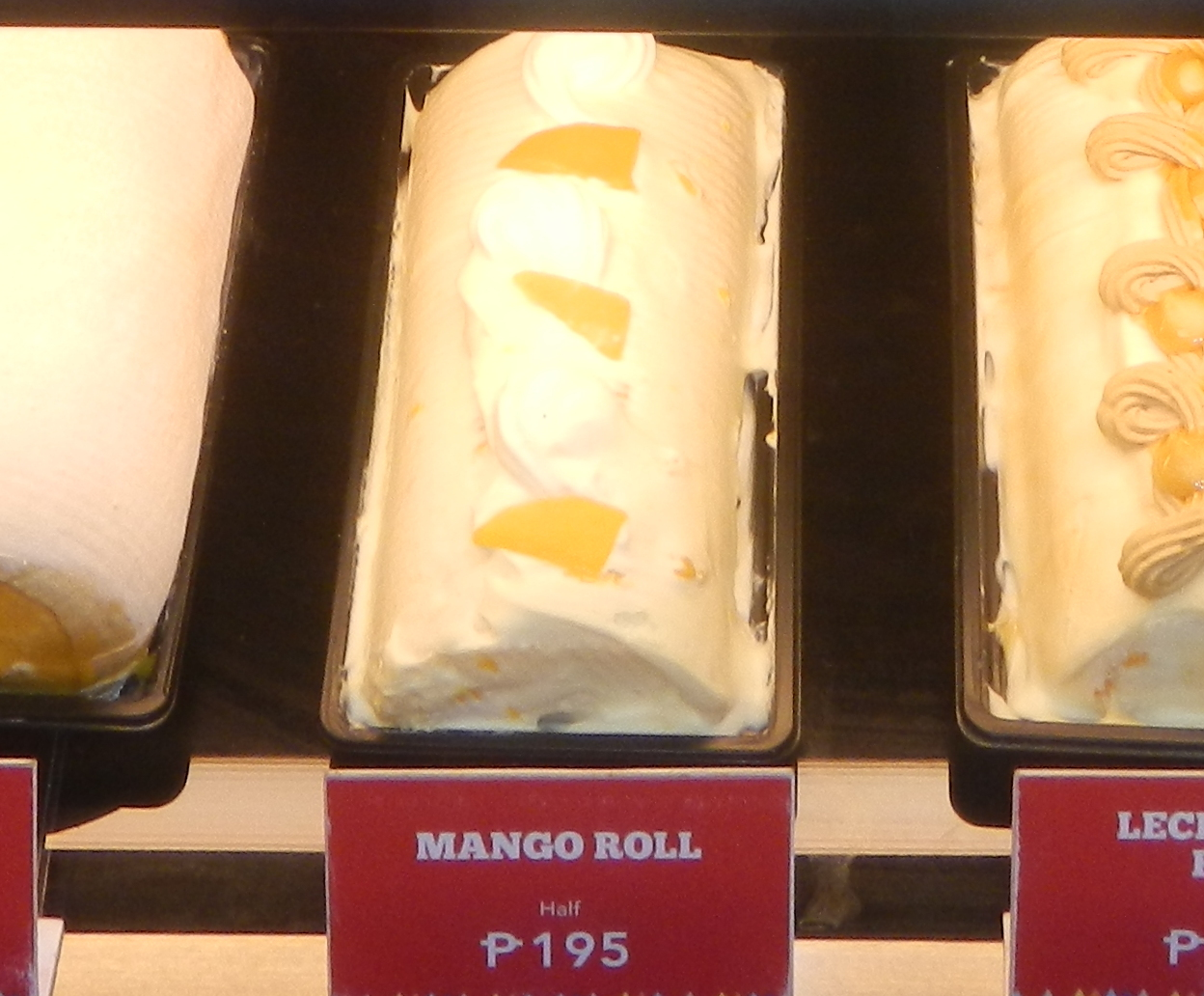
- Top: Mango Passion cake from Red Ribbon Bakeshop; Bottom: Mango pianono (Mango rolls)
- Alternative names: Mango cake
- Course: Dessert
- Place of origin: Philippines
- Similar dishes: Mango float, Crema de fruta

Mango cake or mango chiffon cake, is a Filipino layered chiffon cake infused with ripe sweet Carabao mangoes. It is typically topped with mango cream frosting, fresh mango slices, or pureed mangoes in gulaman or gelatin. Other common toppings include cream, cream cheese, and chocolate. It also commonly sandwiches slices of mangoes between the layers. It is one of the most popular cake variants in the Philippines, where mangoes are abundant year-round. Commercial versions are also available in large bakery chains like Red Ribbon Bakeshop and Goldilocks Bakeshop, as well as individual recipes from restaurants, often with unique names. It is very similar to crema de mangga (or "mango float"), except that mango cake uses layers of chiffon cake not broas or graham crackers. The two recipes can sometimes be combined, however.

Like in ube cakes, mango cakes can also be made as other traditional Filipino mamón cake forms, like as pianonos (Swiss rolls).

== See also ==
- Crema de fruta
- Ube cake
- Buko pandan cake
