= Camachile cookie =

Filipino food

Camachile cookies
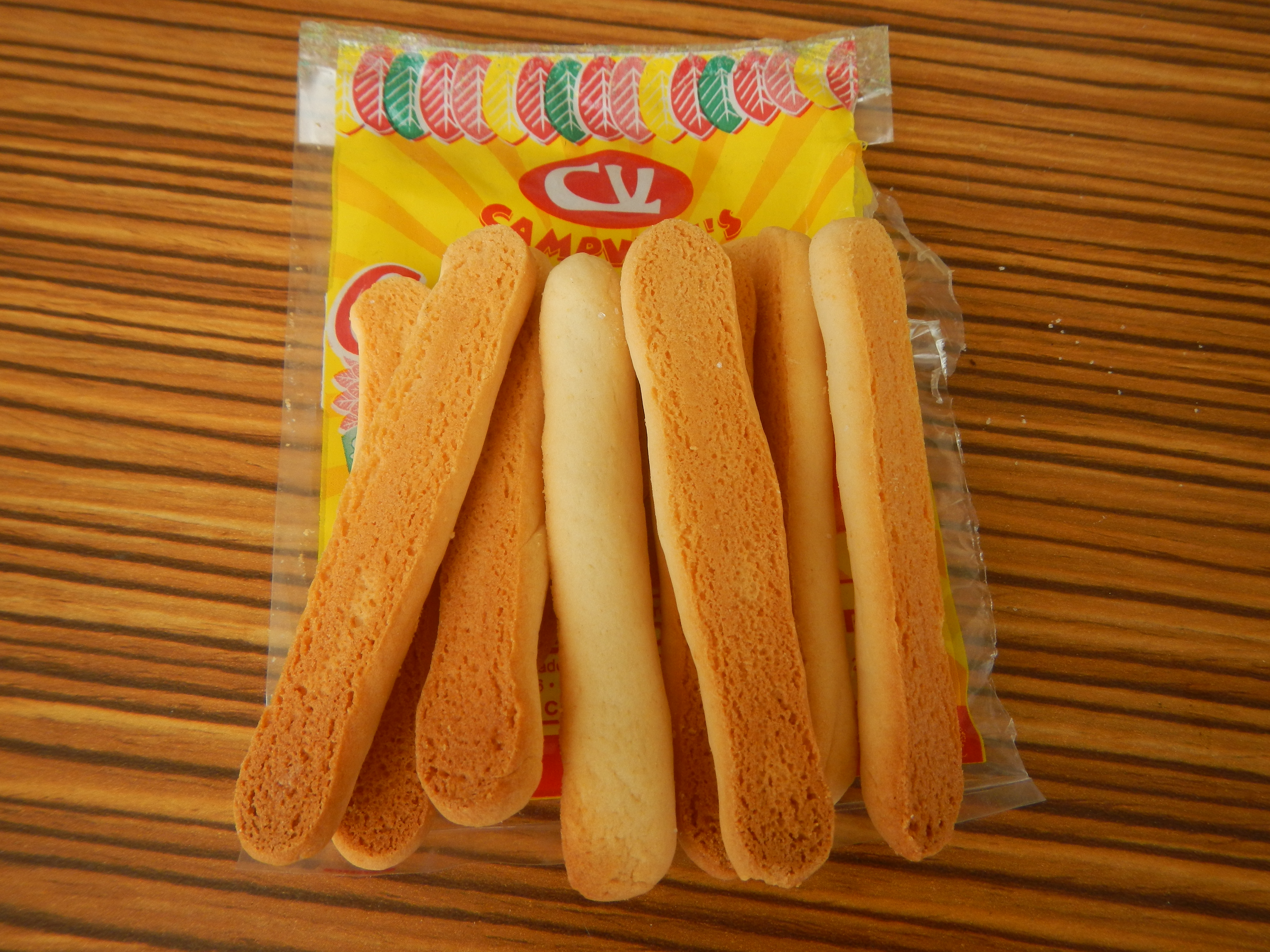
- Alternative names: quinamunsil, kinamunsil, kamatsile cookies, kamatsili cookies, kamachili cookies, camachile baby fingers, camachile finger cookies
- Type: Cookie
- Place of origin: Philippines

Camachile cookies, also known as quinamunsil, are Filipino ladyfinger cookies that are characteristically shaped like the fruits of the camachile tree (Pithecellobium dulce). They are traditionally eaten with hot drinks for breakfast or merienda.

== Etymology ==
The names of the cookies come from the tree Pithecellobium dulce, known as camachile (also spelled kamatsile or kamatsili) in Tagalog. Quinamunsil or kinamunsil, the Hiligaynon name for the cookies are also named after the tree, which is known as kamunsil in Visayan languages.

== Description ==
Camachile cookies are a variation of the larger broas and lengua de gato (Filipino ladyfingers). It is made from flour, eggs, baking powder, baking soda, sugar, salt, butter (or margarine), vanilla, and milk. The cookie has a distinctive lobed and elongated shape.

== See also ==
- Broas
- Christmas cookie
- List of cookies
- Paciencia (cookie)
- Roscas
- Rosquillo
