= Paper wrapped cake =

Type of Chinese cake

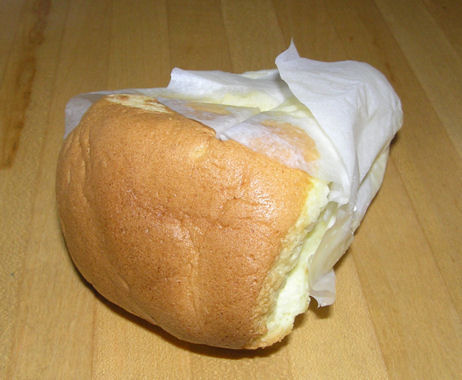
- Paper wrapped cake
- Type: Cake
- Place of origin: Hong Kong
- Main ingredients: Chiffon cake

Paper wrapped cake
- Traditional Chinese: 紙包蛋糕
- Simplified Chinese: 纸包蛋糕
- Literal meaning: paper wrapped cake
Transcriptions
Standard Mandarin
- Hanyu Pinyin: zhǐ bāo dàngāo
Yue: Cantonese
- Yale Romanization: jí bāau daahn gōu
- Jyutping: zi2 baau1 daan6 gou1

Paper wrapped cake (Chinese: 紙包蛋糕; Jyutping: zi^{2} baau^{1} daan^{6} gou^{1}) is a type of Chinese cake. It is one of the most common pastries served in Hong Kong. It can also be found in most Chinatown bakery shops. In essence, it is a chiffon cake baked in a paper cup.

In the bakeries of Chinatown, San Francisco, it is commonly referred to as "sponge cake."

== Preparation ==
Traditionally prepared wrapped cakes are usually steamed in a wok pan, however, Chinese-American sponge cakes are usually baked in an oven. The cakes are typically prepared by separating the egg yolks and whites, and whisking them separately as well.

== Texture ==
Typically prepared and served wrapped in parchment paper squares, Chinese paper wrapped cakes have a deep, golden brown exterior, and a light, fluffy inside. The subtle texture is complemented by a subtle sweetness, which allows them to be served as-is.

== Serving ==
The cakes are typically served in the paper they were baked in. Found in bakeries, the cakes are typically eaten during breakfast, or teatime.

== See also ==
- Egg waffle
