= Pionono =

Spanish pastry

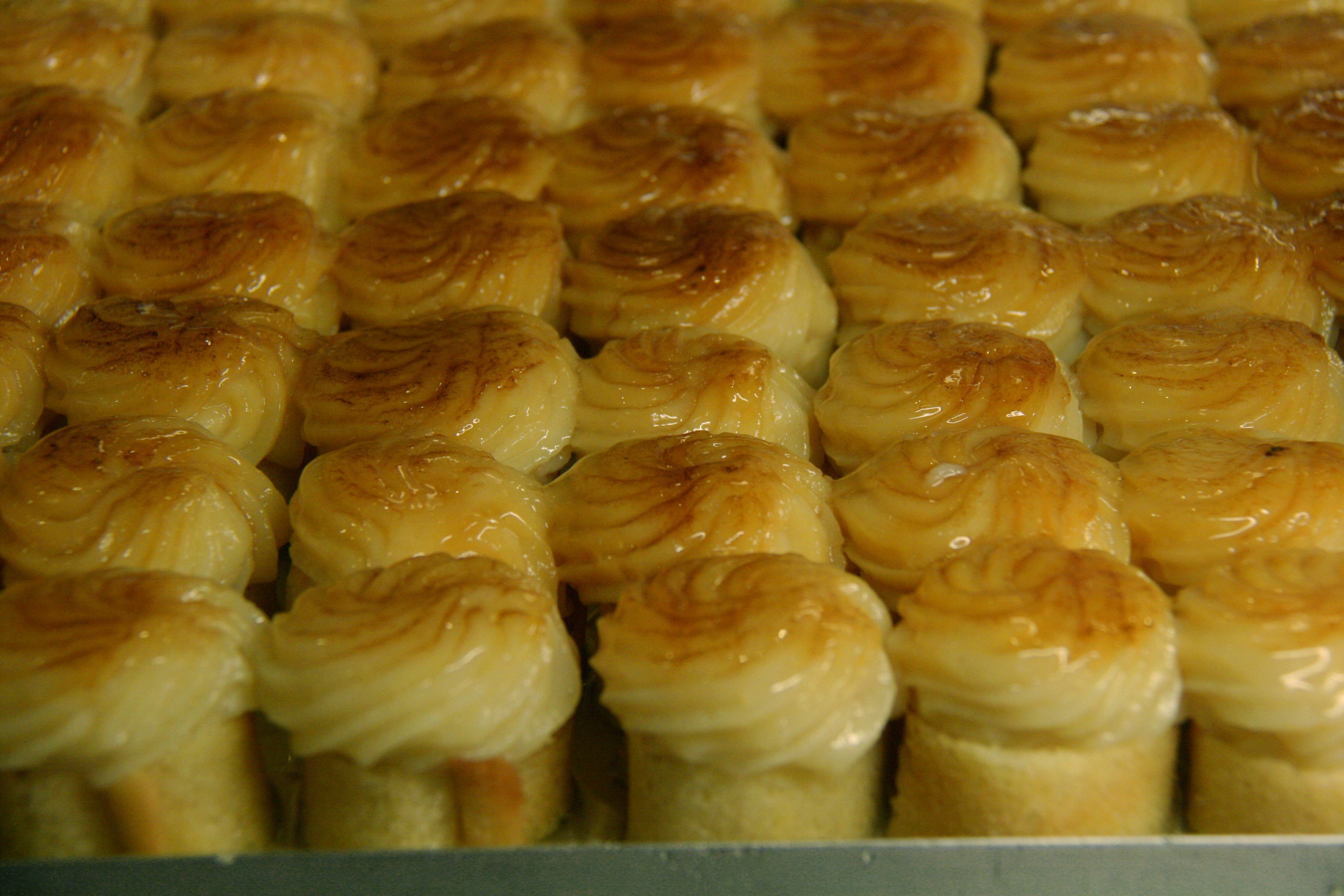
- Piononos from Santa Fe, Spain
- Type: Cake, snack
- Place of origin: Spain

Pionono, sometimes spelled pianono in the Philippines, describes different sweet or savory baked goods from Granada, Spain, the Philippines, South America, and the Caribbean. They are named after Pope Pius IX's name in Italian, Pío Nono.

== History ==
Piononos originated in Spain with the pastry chef Ceferino Isla, that in 1897, created a pastry shop in Santa Fe, in Granada with the name of Casa Ysla. With motif of the pope Pius IX, he made a sweet pastry with his name.

In 1916, Pedro Galatino gave a taste of the pastry to the king Alfonso XIII, who, reportedly, liked it so much he gave Casa Ysla the title of official suppliers of the Casa Real. The royal crown was added to the logo of the Casa, and was removed during the II Republic.

== By country ==
=== Spain ===
Spanish piononos are small cakes traditional in Santa Fe, a small town adjacent to the city of Granada, Spain, which is otherwise known primarily for the Capitulations of Santa Fe between Columbus and the Catholic Monarchs. A pionono has two parts: a thin layer of sponge cake rolled into a cylinder, drenched with different kinds of syrup which give the pionono a sweet and pleasant texture, and crowned with toasted cream. It is typically eaten in one or two bites.

=== Philippines ===
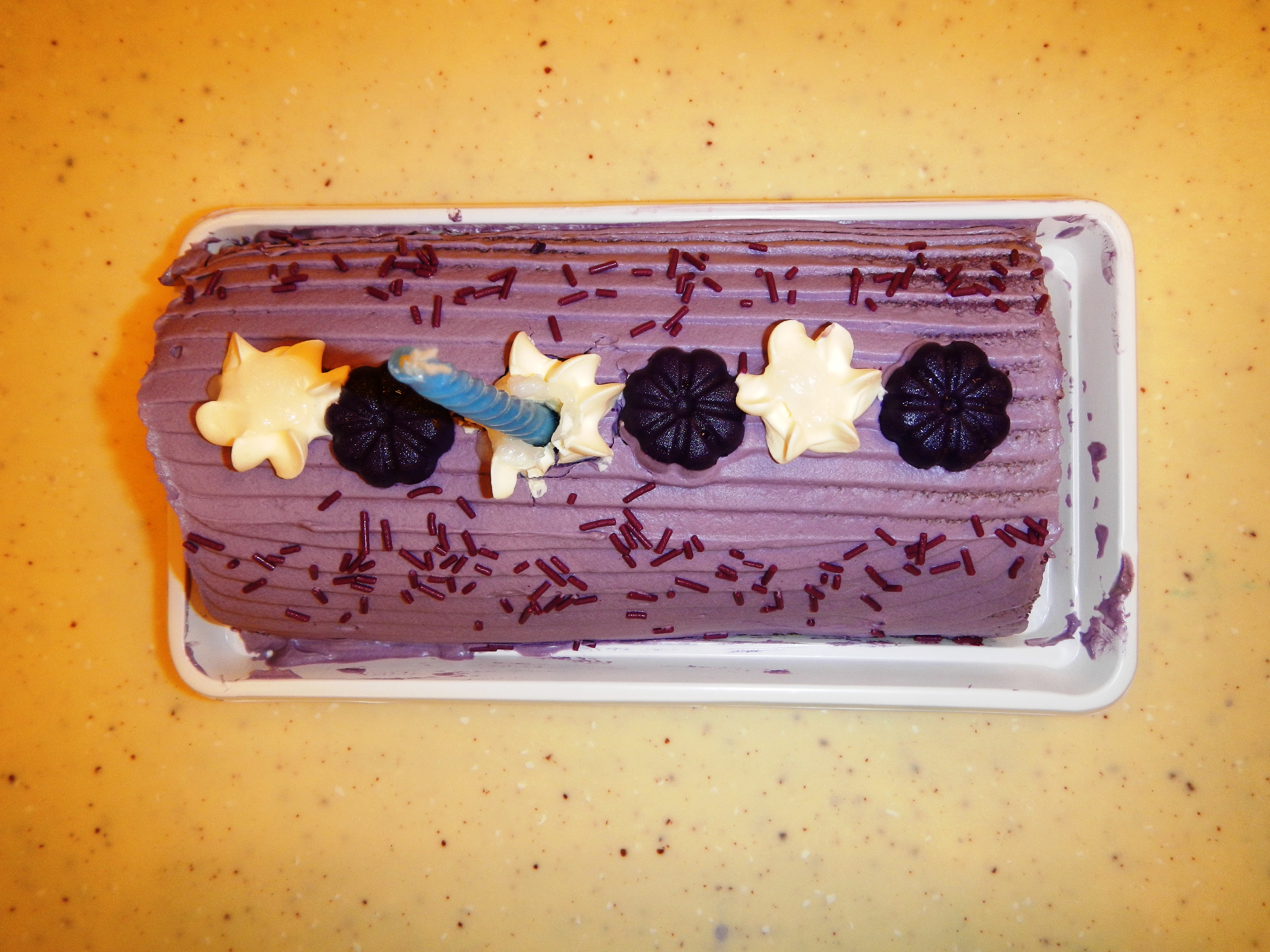
Ube macapuno pionono from the Philippines

In the Philippines, pionono is more commonly spelled as pianono and is a rolled sponge cake (more accurately, a type of Swiss roll). A layer of sheet cake made from eggs, sugar, and sifted flour is baked and cooled, then jelly or other fillings are spread on top. It is then rolled from one end to the other. The most common traditional filling is mixed sugar and butter (or margarine), similar to other forms of the Filipino mamón (sponge cakes). Modern versions are commonly frosted may have a variety of fillings. A derivative is called Brazo de Mercedes.

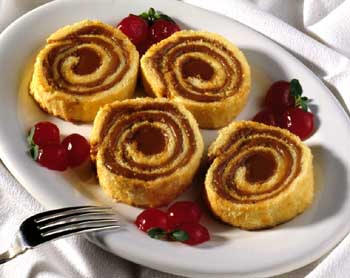
Sweet Argentine piononos with dulce de leche

=== Argentina ===
In Argentina, piononos are made with a spongeous mass with sugar, butter and flour. The base can be used to make both sweet and salty pastries, with multiple ingredients such as dulce de leche or ham and cheese. While similar to other Latin American countries, Argentinian piononos are notoriously more versatile and popular internationally.

=== Latin America and Cuba ===
In various Latin American countries such as Uruguay, Chile, Paraguay, Venezuela, Colombia, Cuba and Peru, piononos are prepared using a dough made of flour, eggs, and sugar, which is baked in a thin sheet then rolled around a filling of dulce de leche sometimes with walnuts, or fruits like strawberries with chantilly cream, or in the case of savory piononos with cured ham, cheese, tomato and mayonnaise, or a savory salad, such as ham salad with asparagus and lettuce, chicken salad or even tuna. In Uruguay a similar preparation called massini is not rolled, its dough is filled with whipped cream and covered with burnt yolks.

=== Puerto Rico (U.S.) ===
In Puerto Rico, piononos are prepared using ripe plantains as the "bread" around a savory filling. Plantains are sliced length wise and fried to make it more pliable to wrap around the filling. Picadillo, seafood, lunch meat, or vegetables topped with cheese are typical fillings; the whole sandwich is dipped in a batter made from flour and eggs and then deep-fried, or baked with no batter.

== Gallery ==
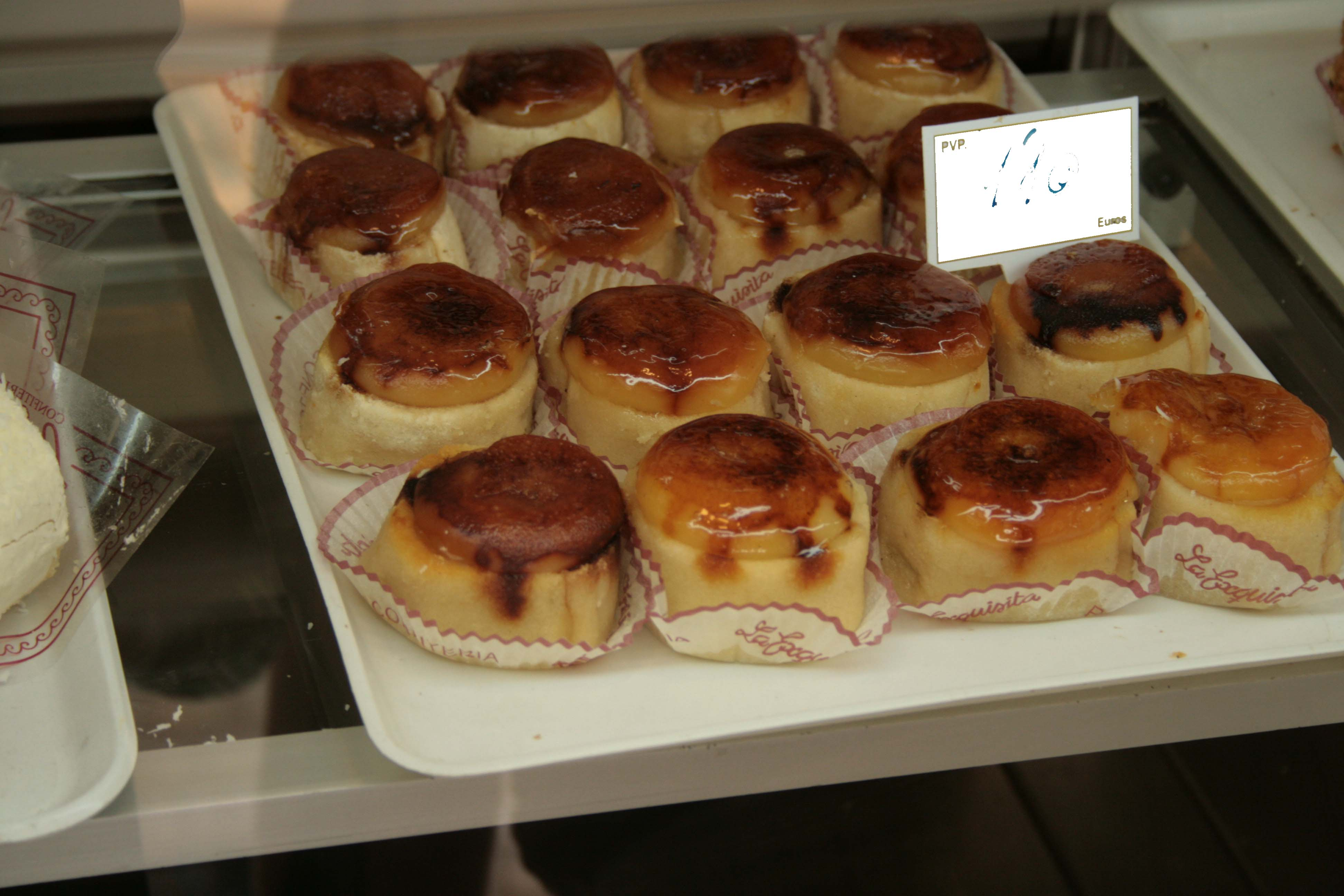
Piononos from Málaga

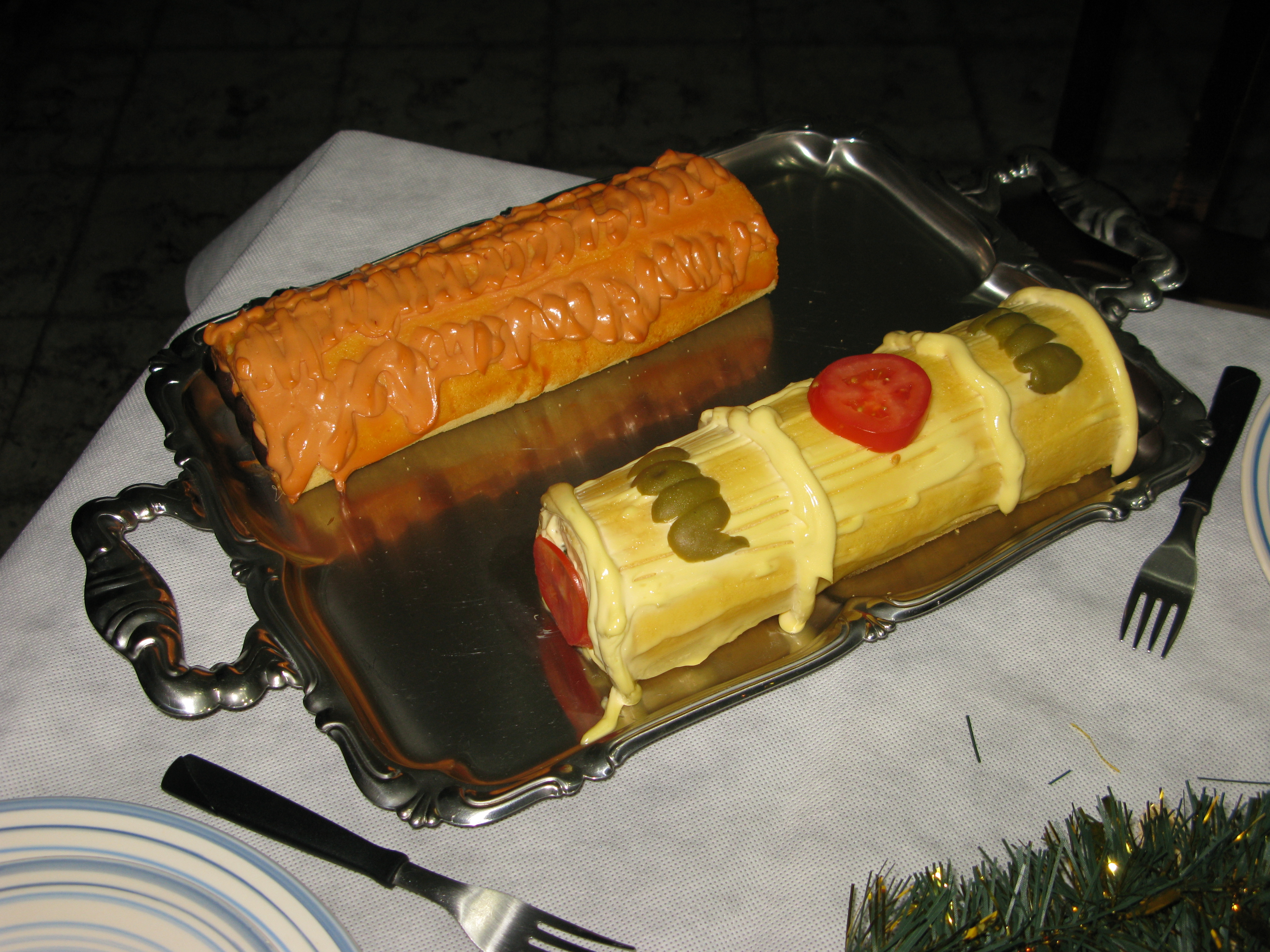
Homemade Argentine piononos

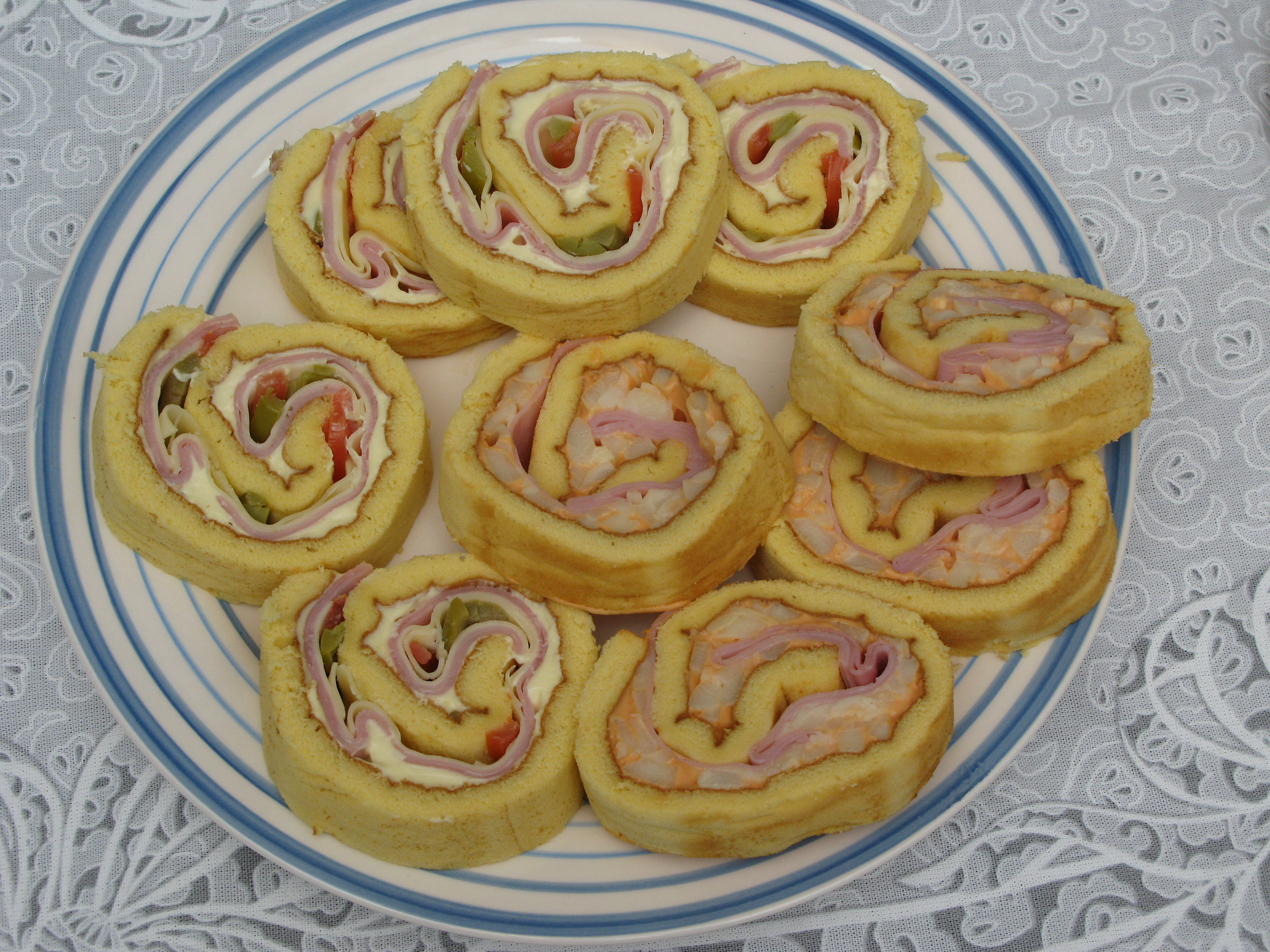
Sliced Savory Argentine pionono, with Ham, cheese, Salsa golf and vegetables

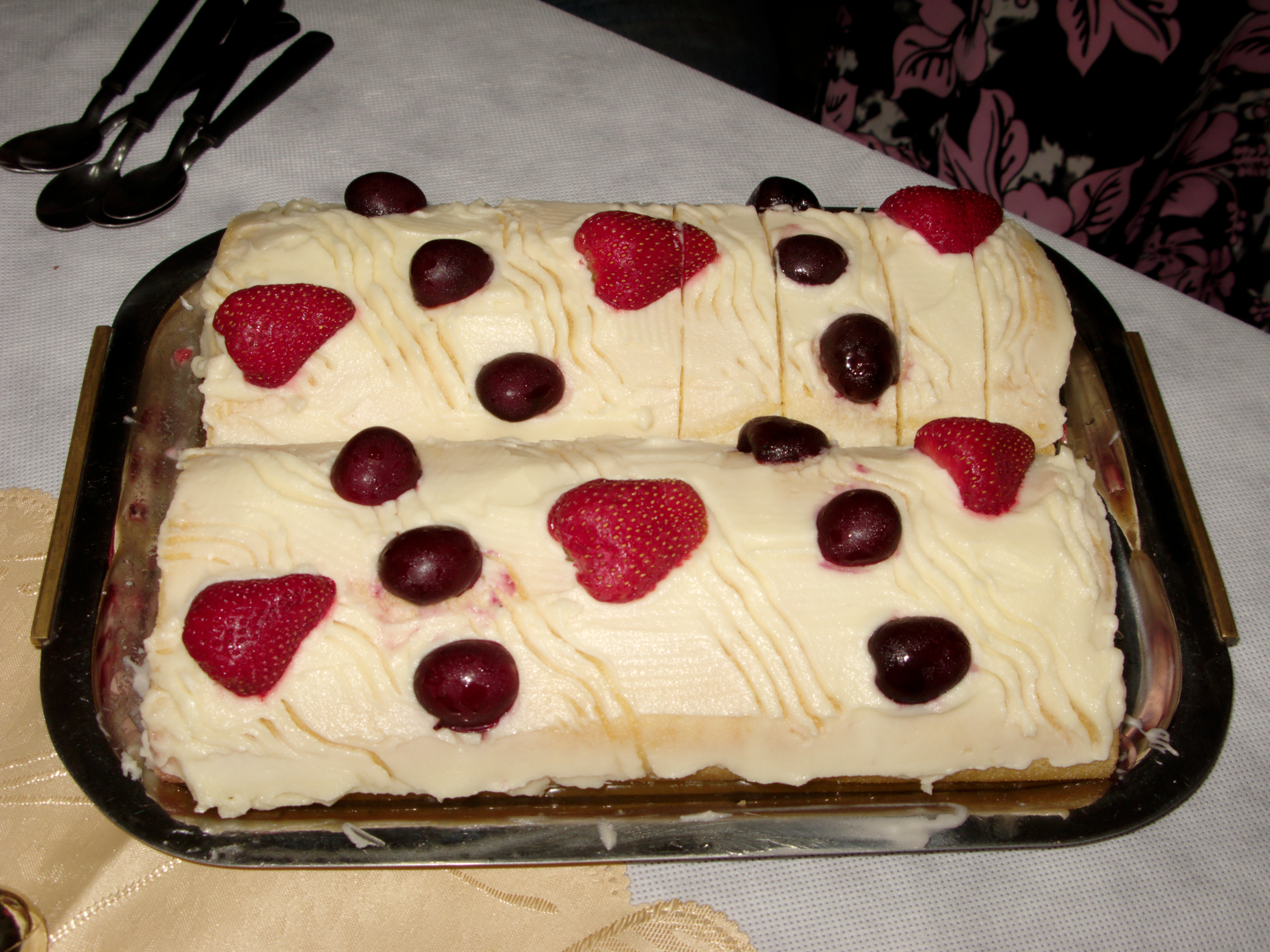
Sweet Argentine piononos

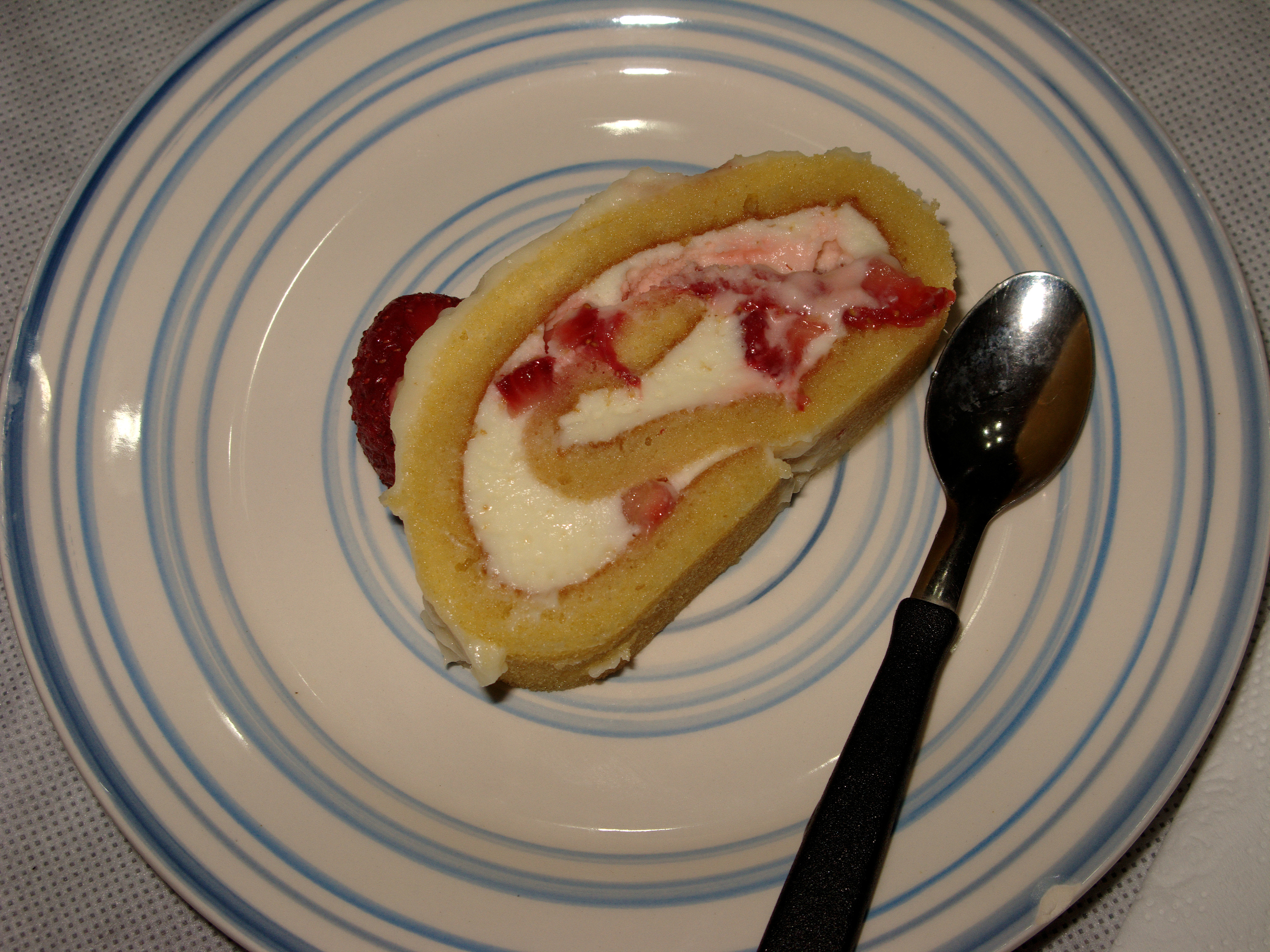
Sliced sweet Argentine pionono

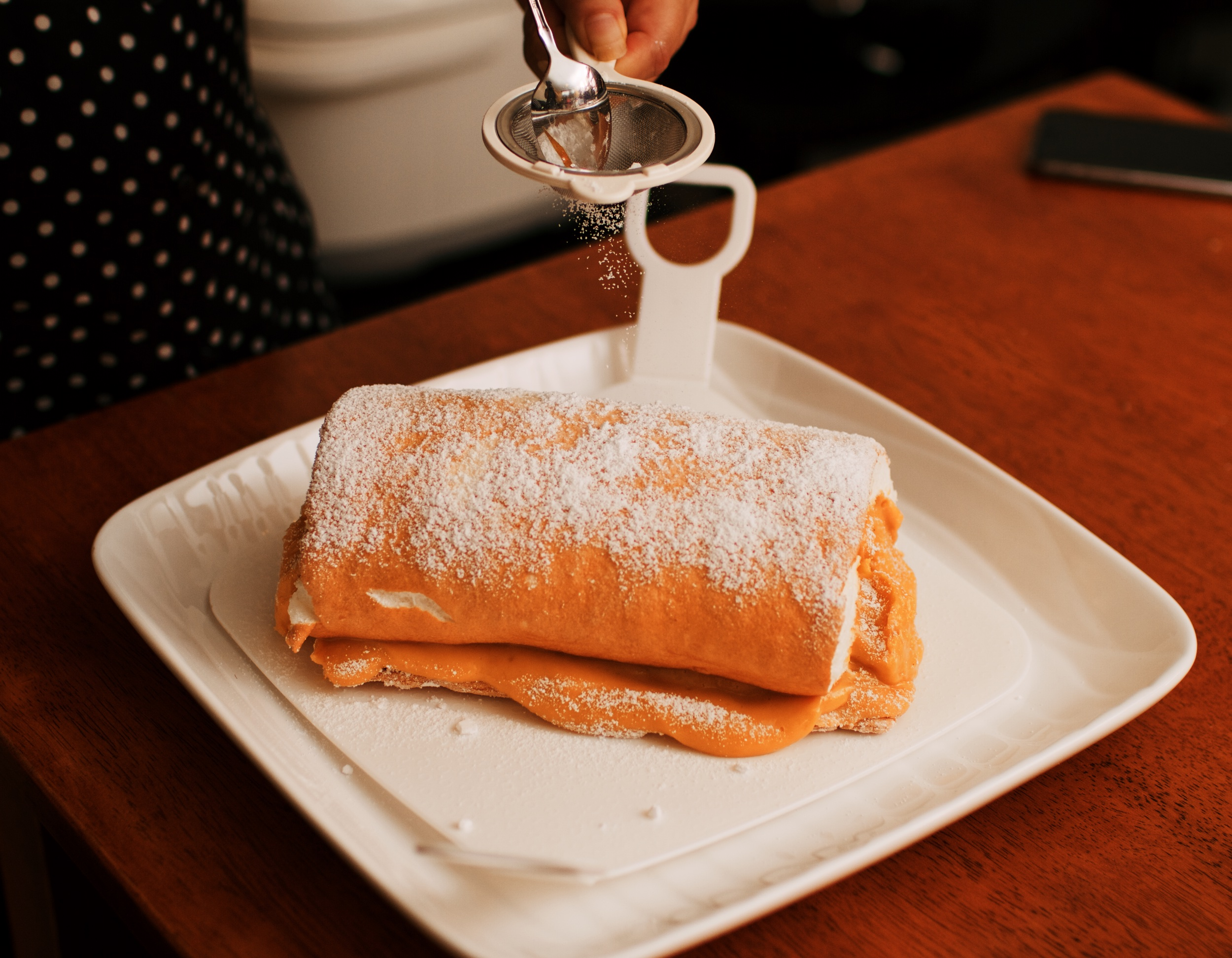
Philippine brazo de Mercedes

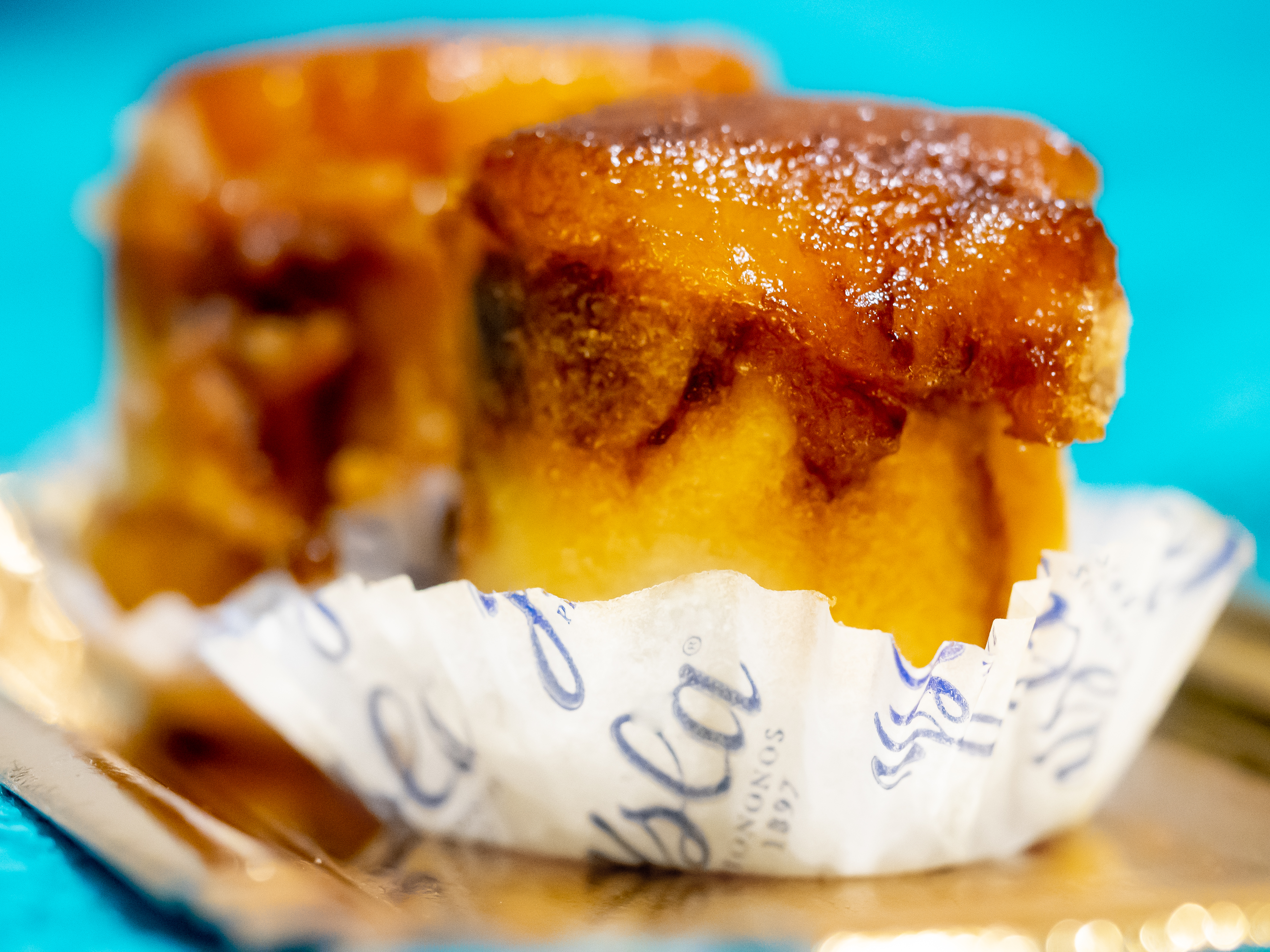
Piononos from Granada

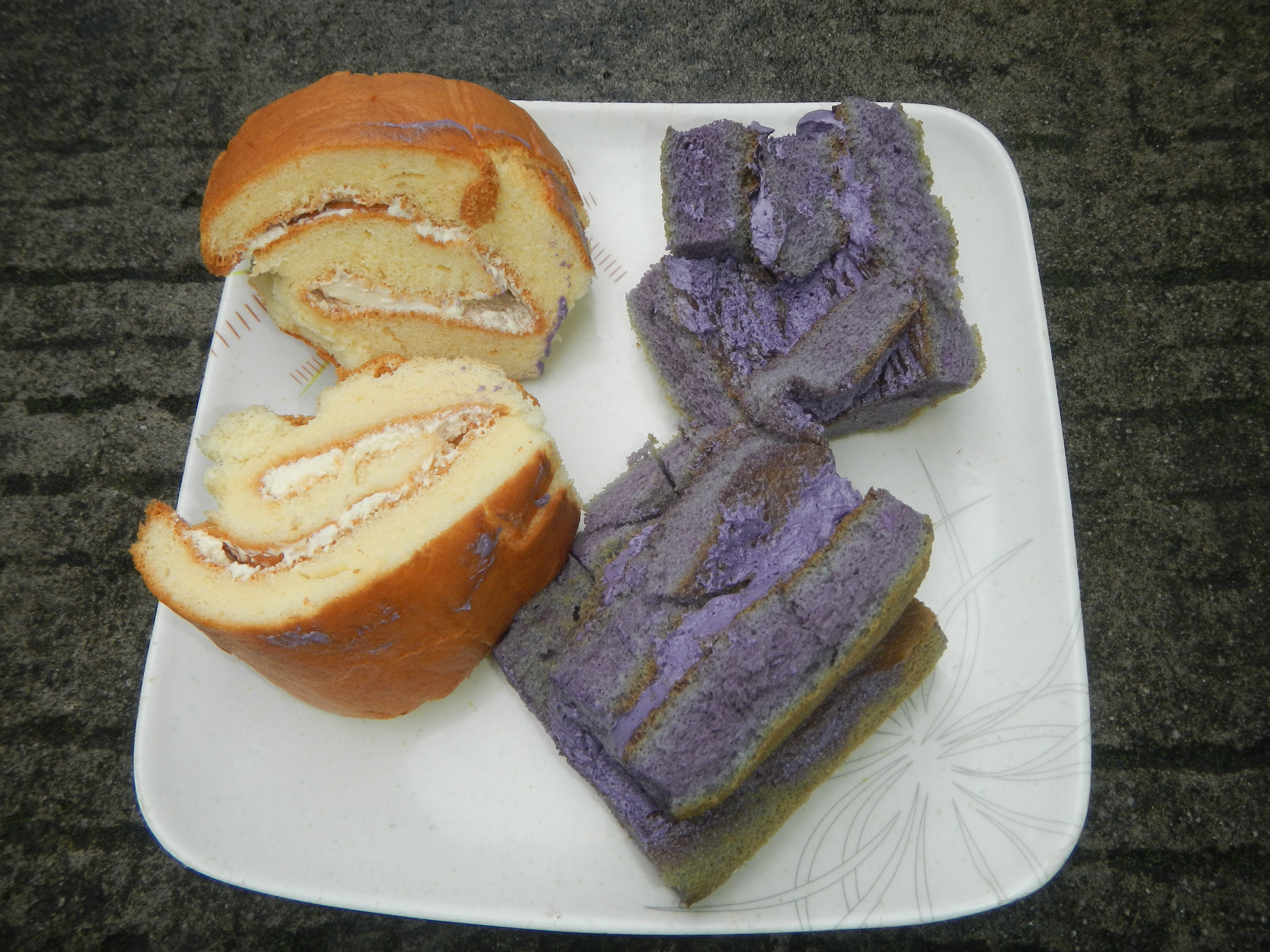
Pianono from the Philippines

== See also ==
- Mamón
- Swiss roll
- Yule log (cake)
- Nut roll
- Berliner (doughnut)
