= Mamón =

Traditional Filipino chiffon or sponge cakes

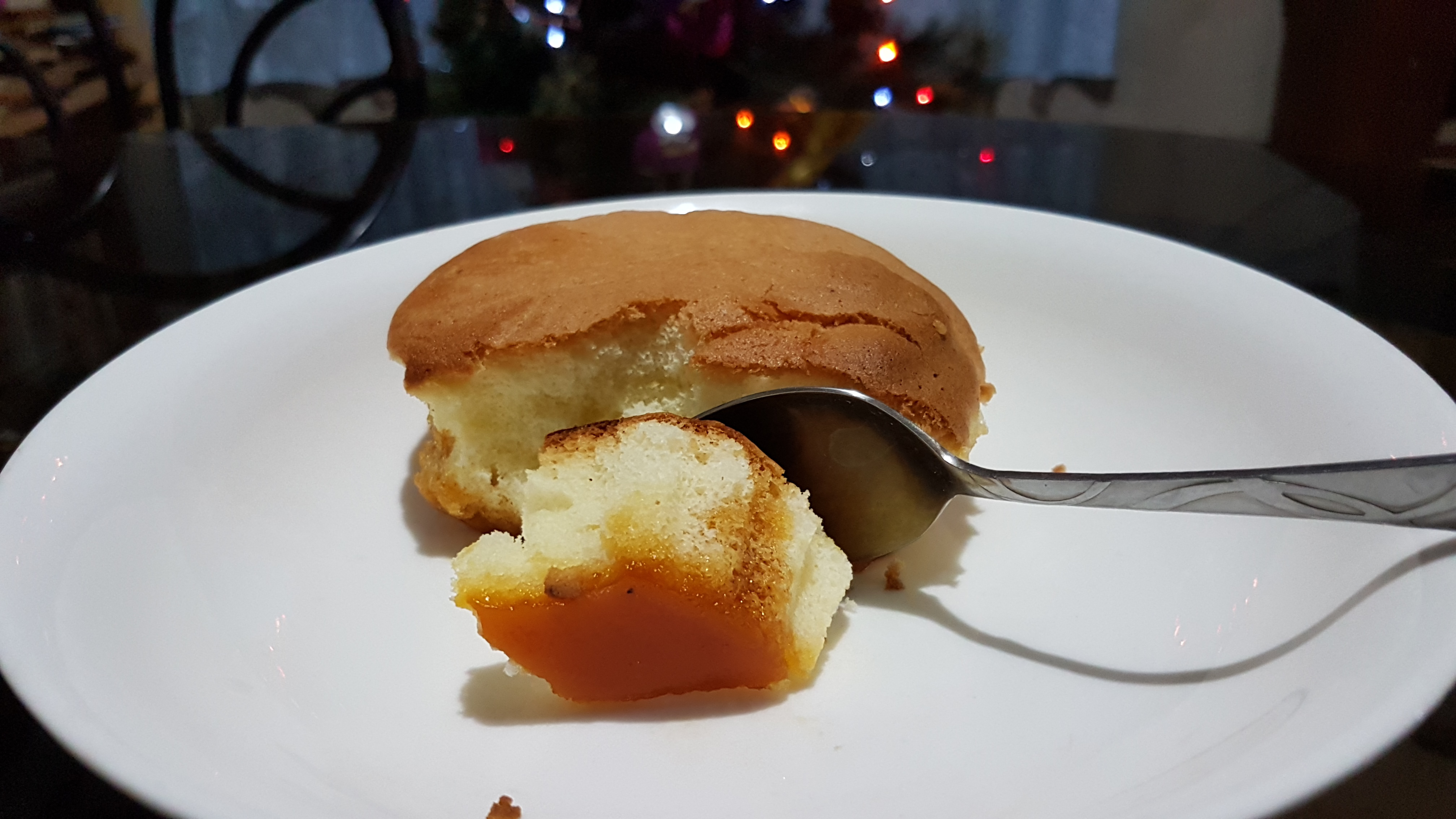
- Custard mamón with a leche flan base
- Alternative names: Torta, torta mamón, torta Visaya, torta Bisaya
- Course: Dessert
- Place of origin: The Philippines
- Main ingredients: Cake flour, sugar, baking powder, eggs, oil, butter, cream of tartar
- Variations: Mamón tostado, puto mamón, taisan, broas

Mamón are traditional Filipino chiffon or sponge cakes, typically baked in distinctive cupcake-like molds. In the Visayas regions, mamón are also known as torta mamón or torta. Variants of mamón include the larger loaf-like version called taisan, the rolled version called pianono, and ladyfingers known as broas. Mamón also has two very different variants that use mostly the same ingredients, the cookie-like mamón tostado and the steamed puto mamón.

== Description ==
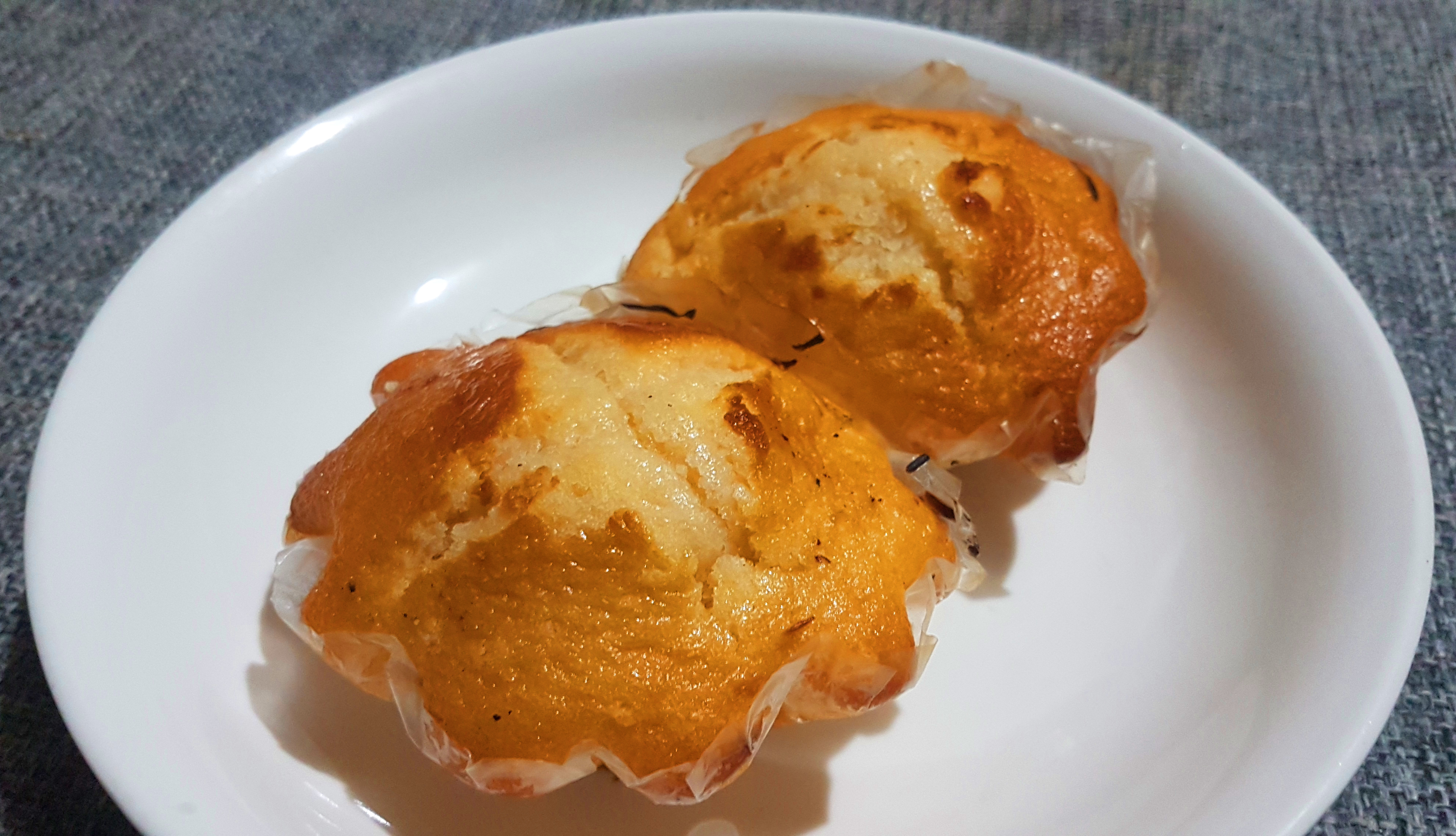
Visayan torta mamón

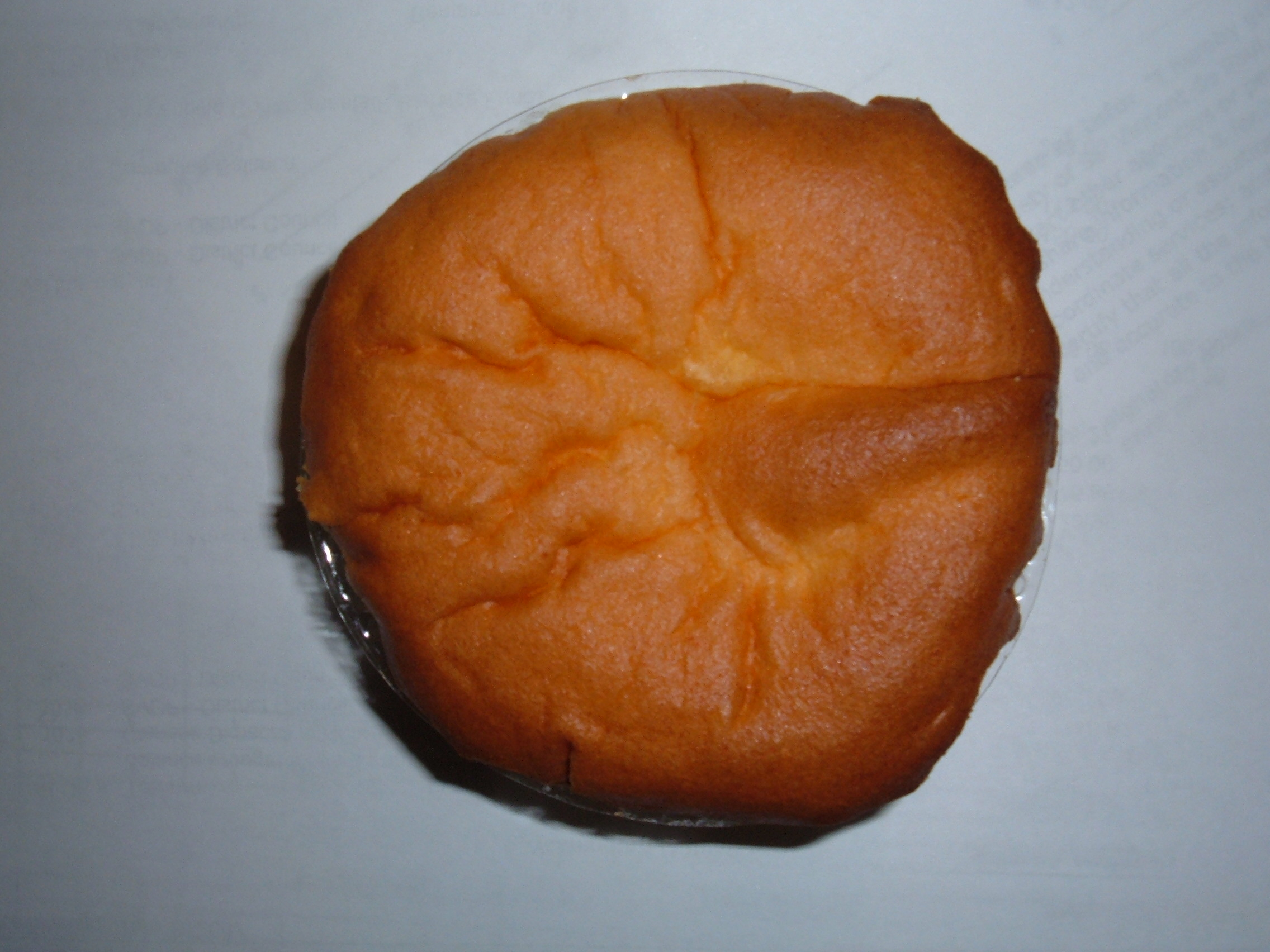
The characteristic round cupcake-like shape of mamón

Mamón is a very light chiffon or sponge cake known for its soft and fluffy texture. It is traditionally baked in crenelated tin molds which gives it a characteristic cupcake-like shape. It is typically slathered in butter and sprinkled with white sugar and grated cheese. Mamón is commonly eaten for merienda. In the Visayas regions, mamón is known as torta mamón, torta Visaya (or torta Bisaya), or simply torta. Although the name is derived from Spanish torta, "cake", in some Philippine regions torta could also mean "omelette". The Visayan versions are traditionally denser and greasier in texture. They were traditionally made with lard and use palm wine (tubâ) as the leavening agent.

== Variants ==
=== Broas ===
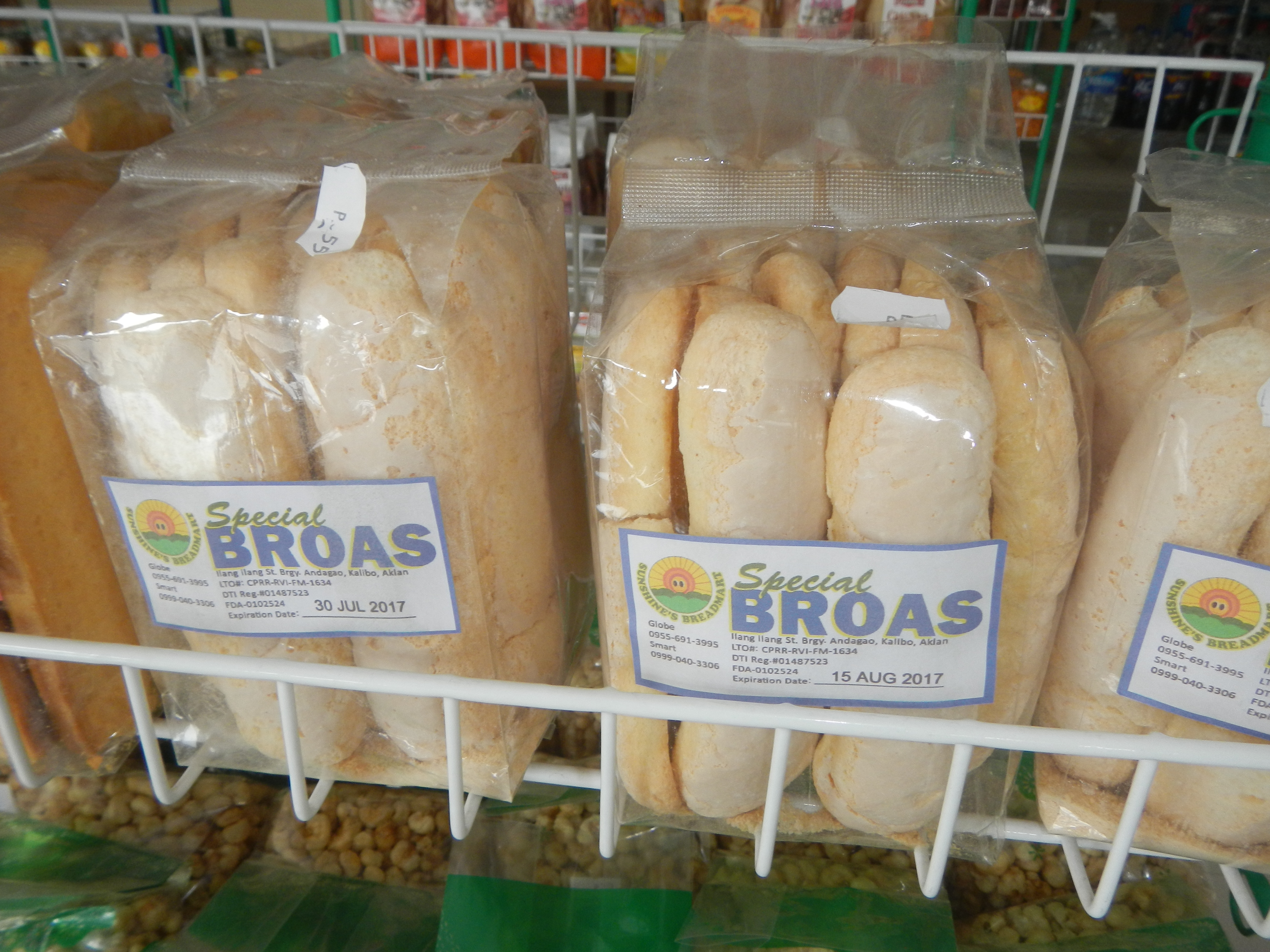
Broas (ladyfingers) from Kalibo, Aklan

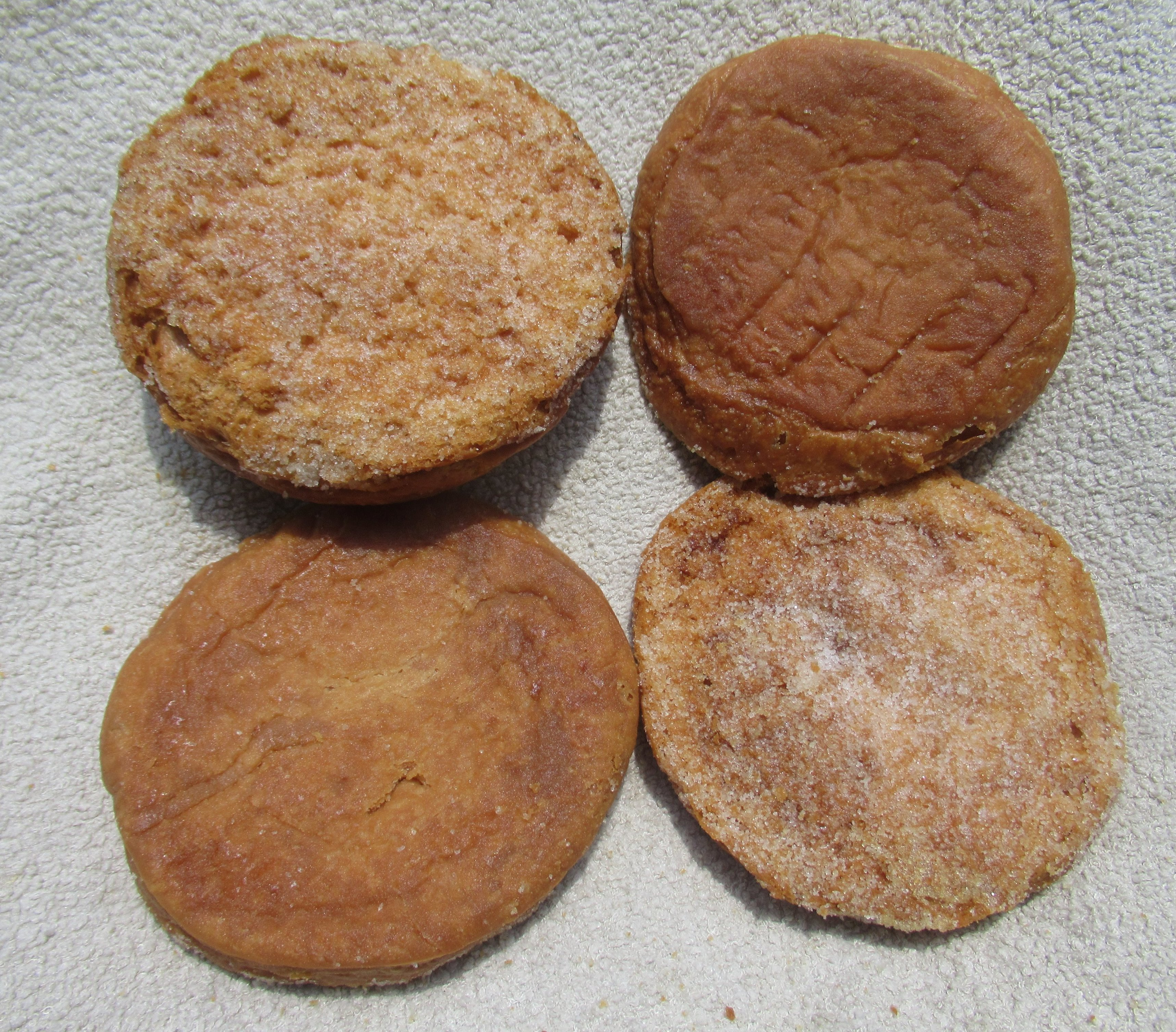
"Mamón Tostado"

The ladyfinger version of mamón is known as broas or broa. The name is derived from Portuguese broa, a type of corn and rye bread from Portugal and Galicia. Broas can either be soft and spongy or crunchy and cookie-like. They are commonly eaten paired with coffee or hot chocolate (sikwate). They are also traditionally used to make icebox cakes in the Philippines, including crema de fruta and mango float.

Among Muslim Filipinos, broa (also spelled b'rua, bulwa, or baulo) is a derivative dish. They are eaten similarly and can also come in soft or crunchy versions, but they have a more irregular muffin-like shape. The soft version is like a smaller version of mamón, while the crunchy version is more properly mamón tostado. They are popularly eaten during special occasions and festivals, like Hari Raya.

Other notable variants of dry and crunchy broas include the camachile cookies and the lengua de gato cookies.

=== Mamón tostado ===
Mamón tostado is basically a cookie-like version of mamón (from Spanish: tostado, lit. 'toasted'). It uses the same ingredients and is similarly airy, but it is baked until dry and crunchy. "Mamón Tostado" as a traditional Pasalubong is a round-shaped toasted chiffon cake-pastry which originated from Cebu. As a variant of Biscocho, it is a fusion of flour, shortening, eggs, and sugar.

=== Pianono ===
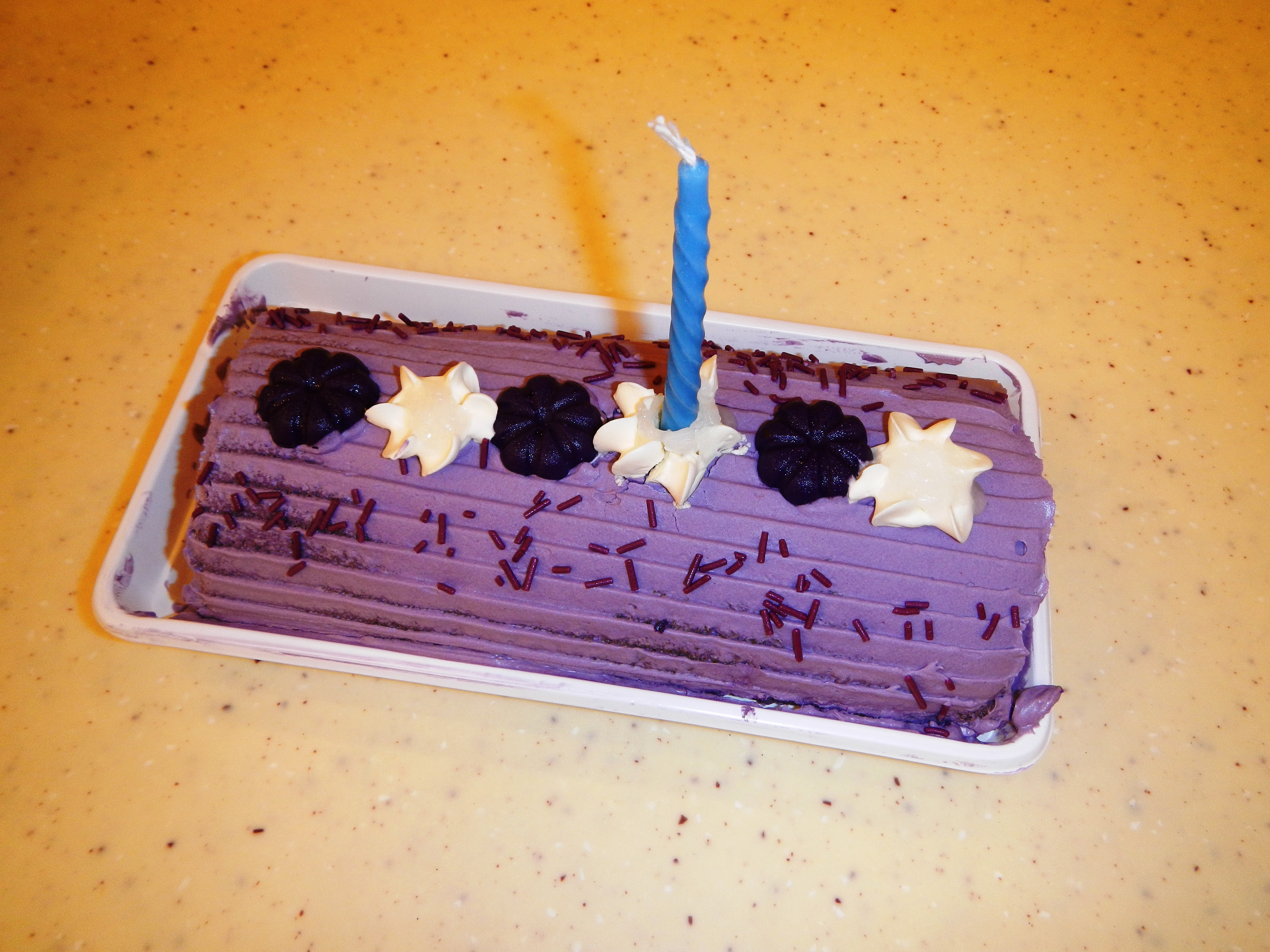
Ube pianono

Pianono or pionono is a rolled version of the mamón. It is typically sold as "cake rolls" in modern times due to its resemblance to the Swiss roll. Originally, its filling was composed only of sugar and butter or margarine, like all other kinds of mamón. It is also traditionally much smaller in diameter than Swiss rolls. But modern versions are larger can vary significantly in the fillings and are usually frosted.

=== Puto mamón ===
Puto mamón is regarded as a type of puto (steamed cake).

=== Taisan ===
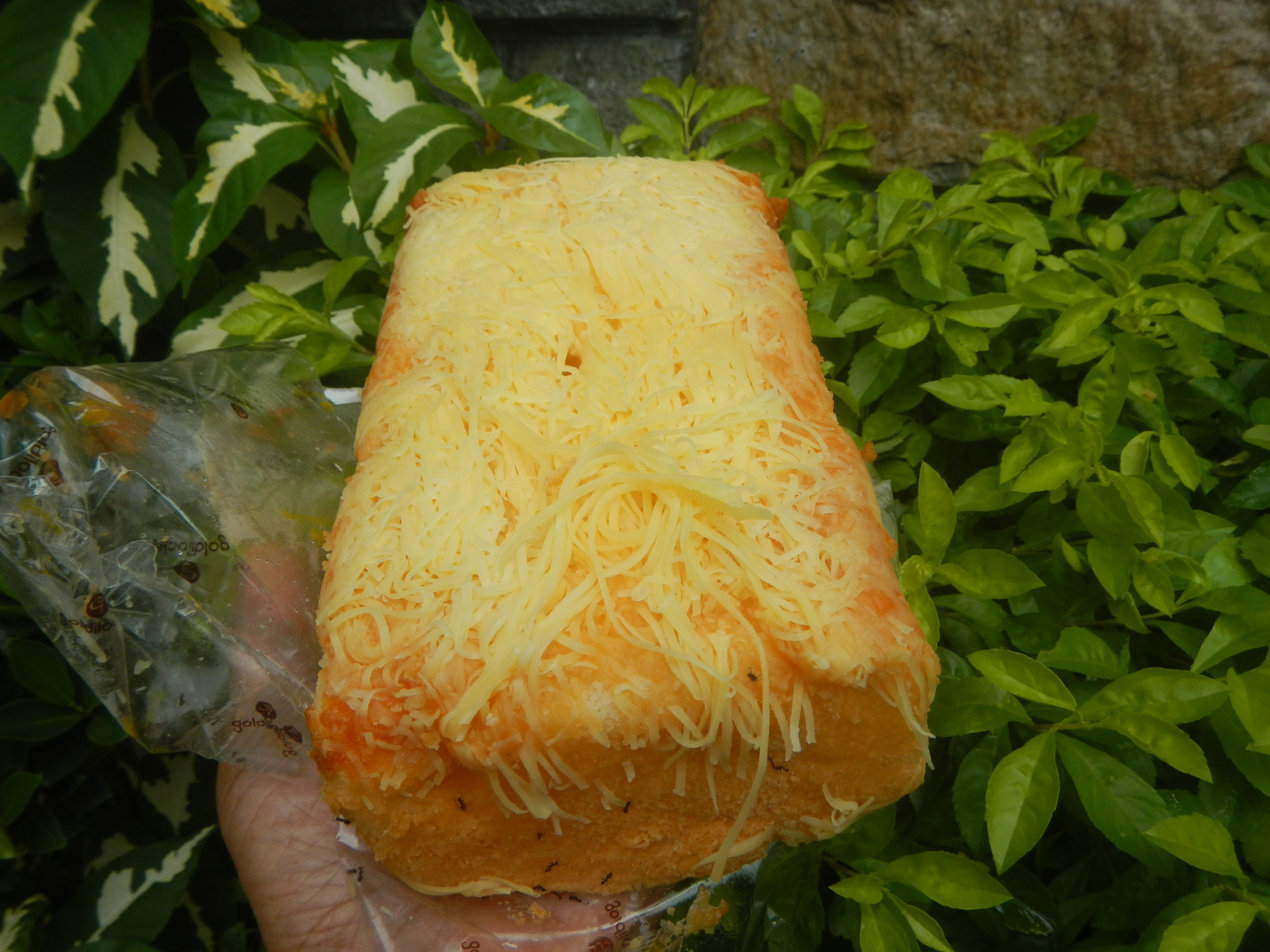
Cheese taisan

Taisan is a loaf-like version of mamón. Like mamón, it is typically slathered in butter and sprinkled with sugar and cheese. Taisan was first developed in Pampanga. It literally means "whetstone" in Kapampangan, and is named for its shape.

== In popular culture ==
In Filipino idioms, pusong mamón (literally "mamón-hearted") means someone who is overly emotionally-sensitive. It is equivalent to the English idiom "softhearted". It is also used as a euphemism for effeminate gay men (bakla).

== See also ==
- Bibingka
- Crema de fruta
- Mango cake
- Panyalam
- Pastel de Camiguín
- Ube cake
