= Chiffon cake =

Type of cake

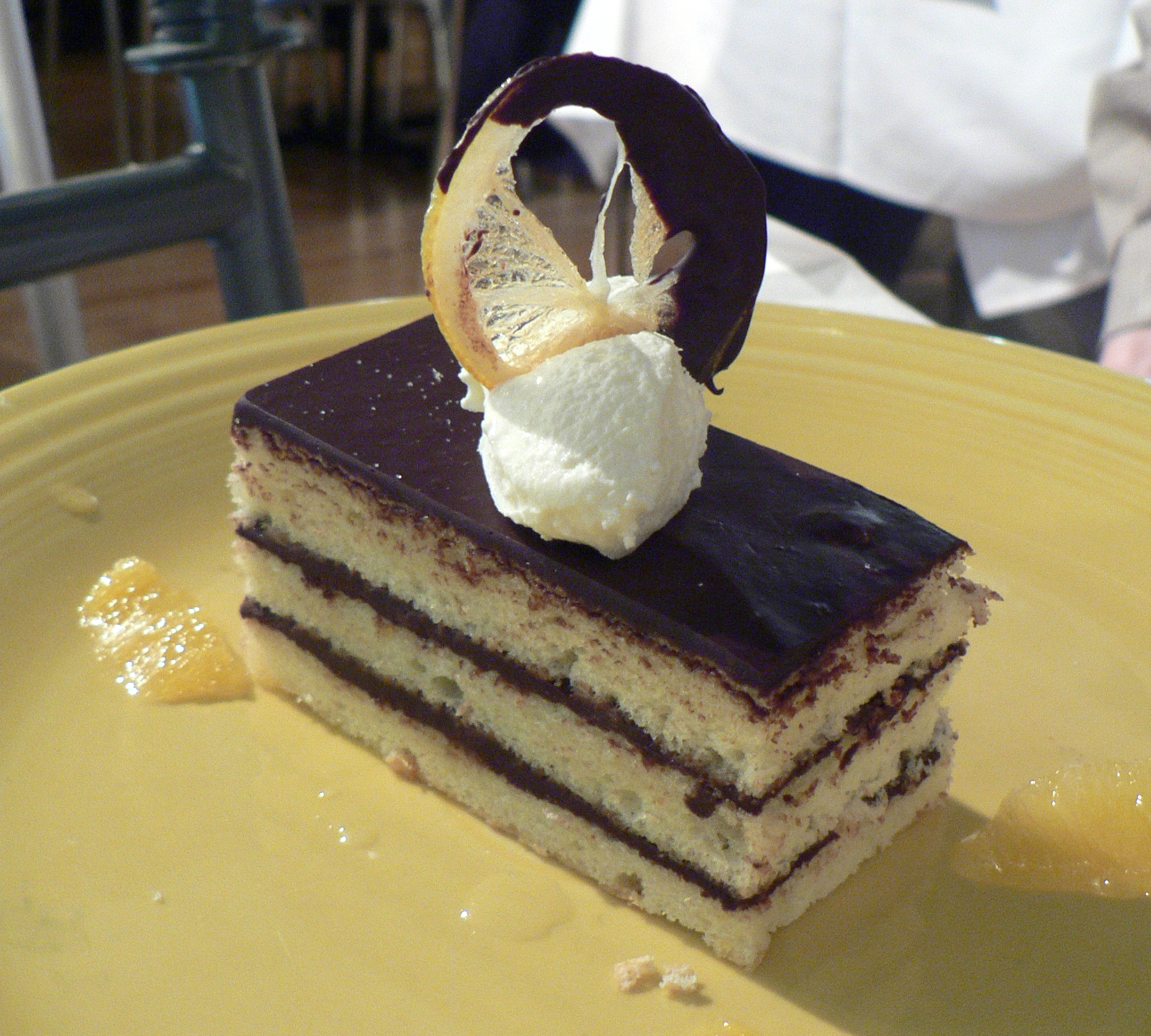
- Chiffon cake with chocolate
- Type: Cake
- Place of origin: United States
- Region or state: Worldwide
- Created by: Harry Baker
- Main ingredients: Flour, vegetable oil, eggs, sugar

A chiffon cake is a light cake made with vegetable oil, eggs, sugar, flour, baking powder, and flavorings.

Chiffon cakes (as well as angel food cake, sponge, and other foam cakes) achieve a fluffy texture by having egg whites beaten separately until stiff and then folded into the cake batter before baking. Its aeration properties rely on both the quality of the meringue and the chemical leaveners such as baking powder.

Chiffon cake can be baked in a tube pan or layered with fillings and icings.

In the original recipe, the cake tin is not lined or greased, which enables the cake batter to stick to the side of the pan, giving the cake better leverage to rise, as well as support in the cooling process when the cake is turned upside down to keep air bubbles stable.

== Characteristics ==
The high oil and egg content create a very moist cake that does not tend to harden or dry out as traditional butter cakes might. This makes it better-suited than many cakes to fill or frost with ingredients that need to be refrigerated or frozen, such as pastry cream or ice cream. The lack of butter means that chiffon cakes lack much of the rich flavor of butter cakes.

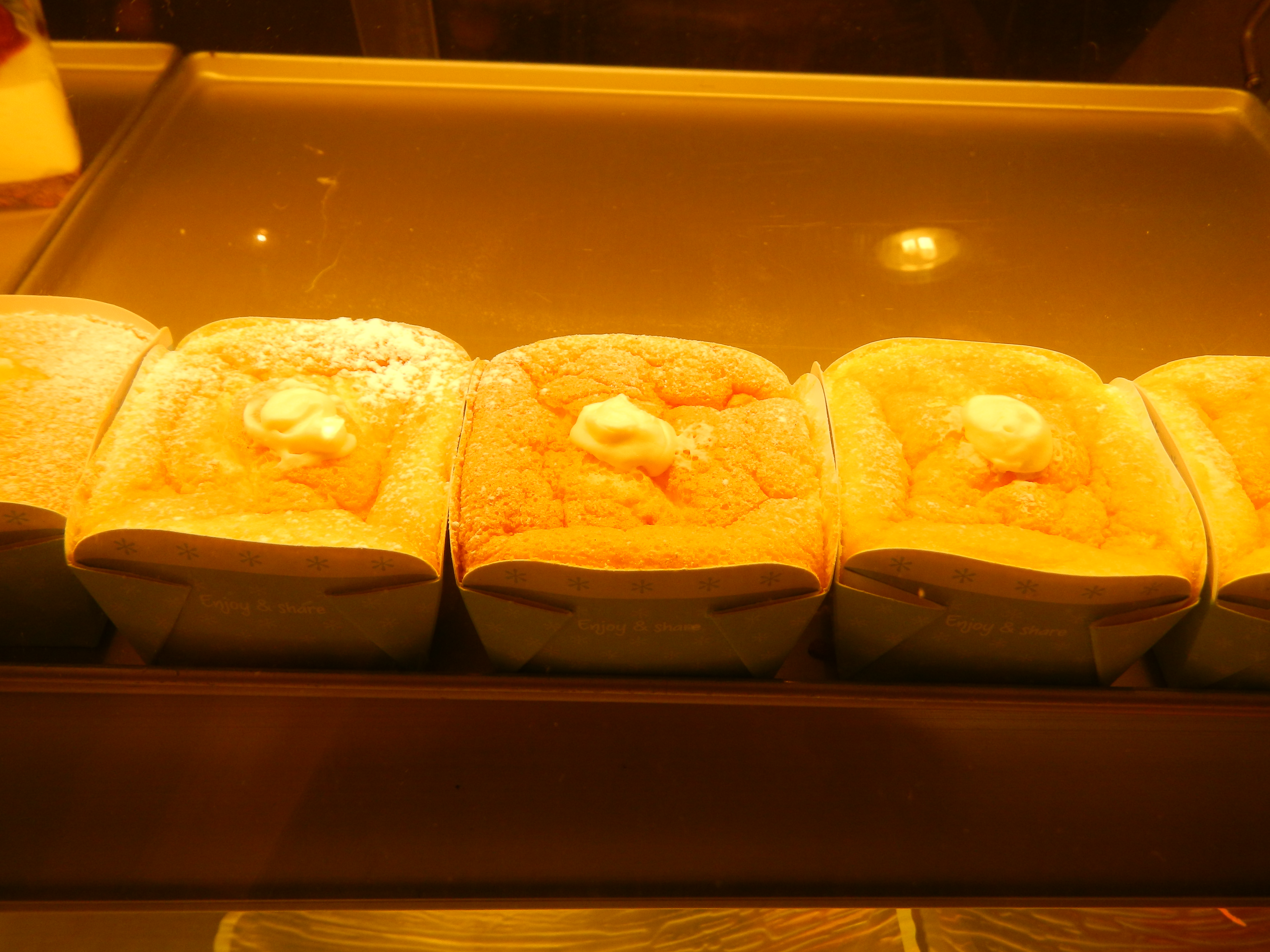
Hokkaido cake, a chiffon cupcake filled with cream, French Baker (Philippines)

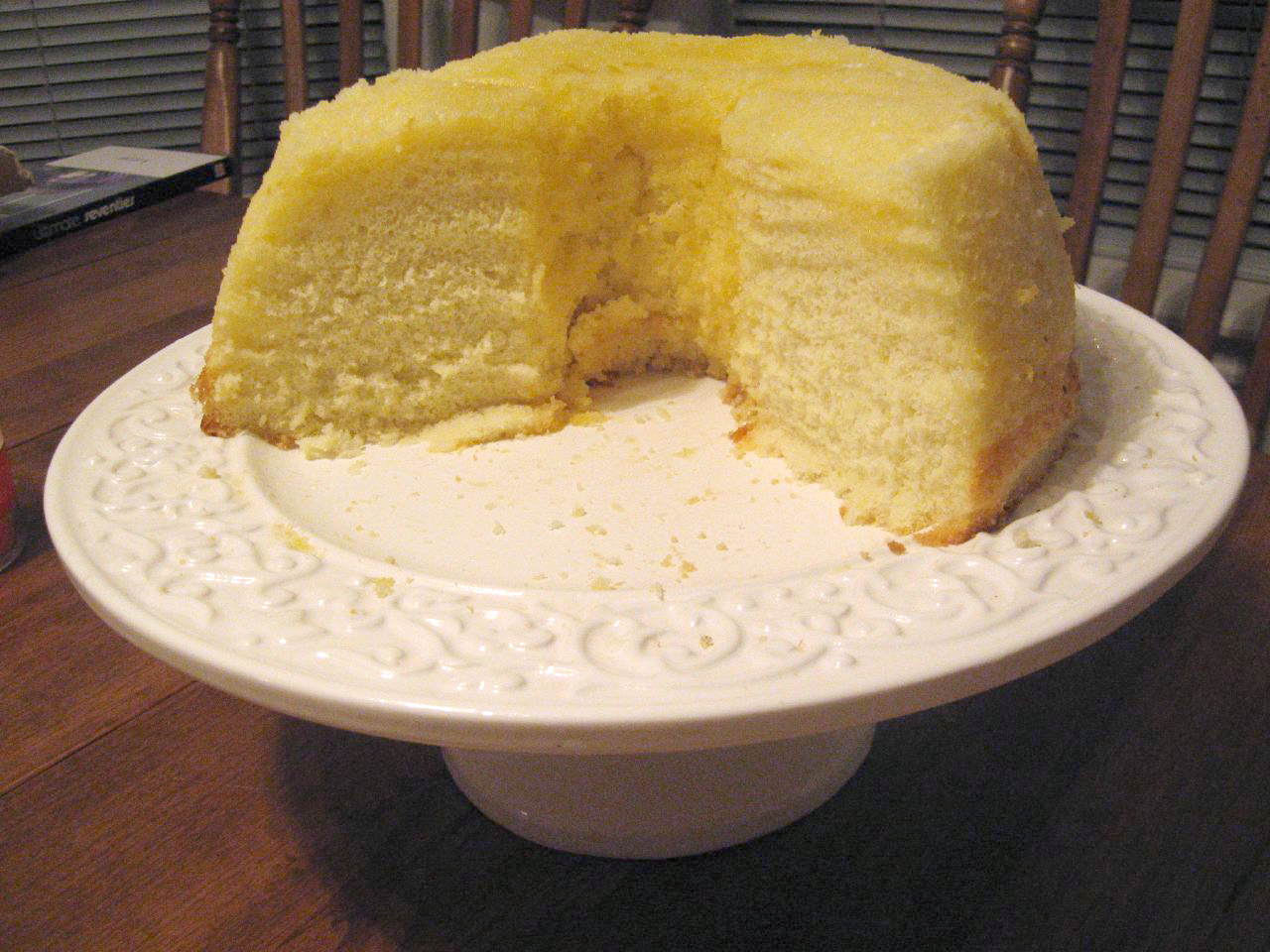
Lemon chiffon cake

== History ==
The recipe is credited to Harry Baker (1883–1974), a Californian insurance salesman turned caterer. Baker kept the recipe secret for 20 years until he sold it to General Mills, which spread the recipe through marketing materials in the 1940s and 1950s under the name "chiffon cake", and a set of 14 recipes and variations was released to the public in a Betty Crocker pamphlet published in 1948.

== See also ==
- Japanese cheesecake
- Paper wrapped cake
- List of lemon dishes and beverages
- Chiffon pie
- Chiffon (fabric)
