= List of Philippine desserts =

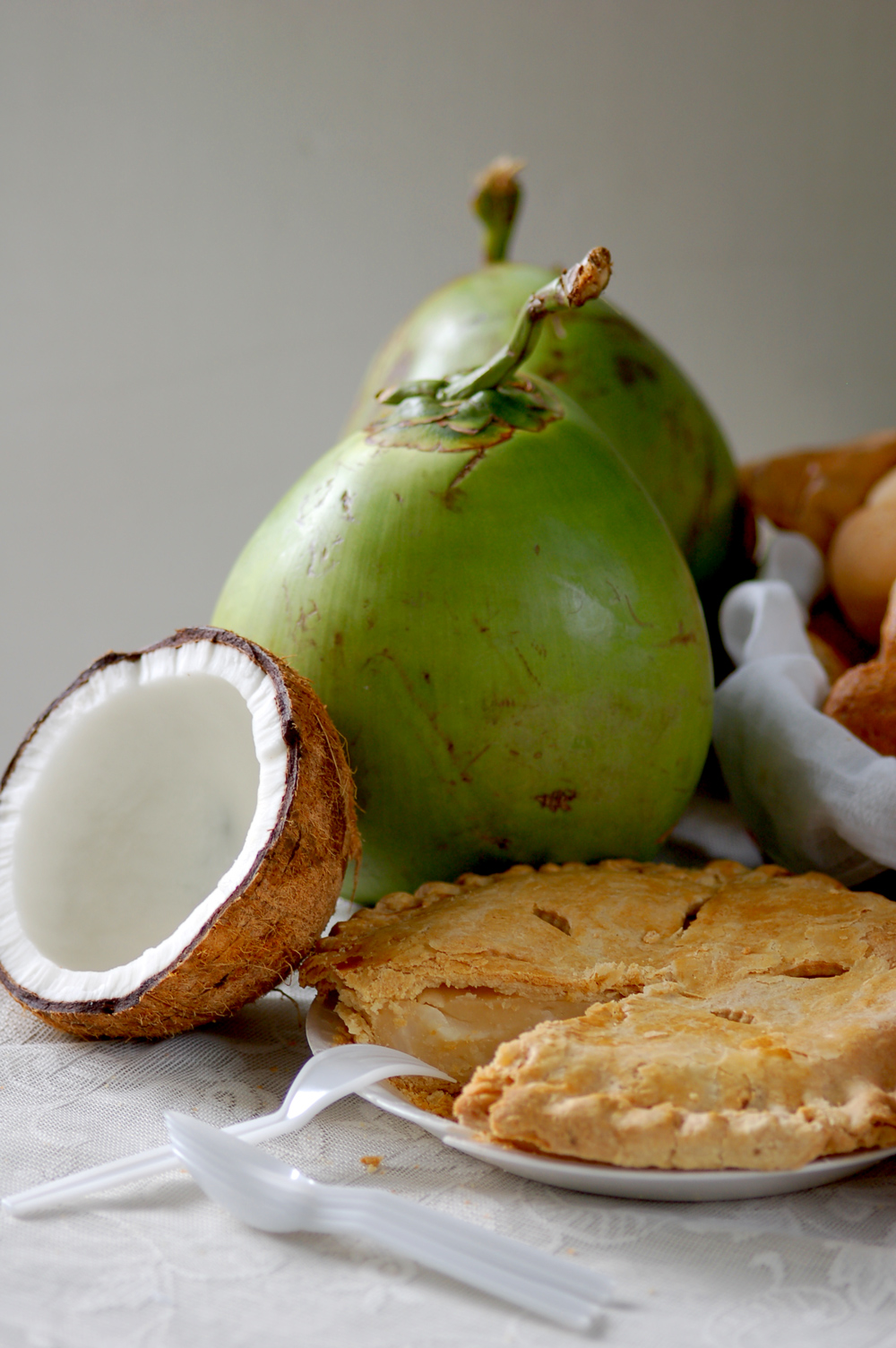
Buko pie and ingredients

This is a list of Filipino desserts. Filipino cuisine consists of the food, preparation methods and eating customs found in the Philippines. The style of cooking and the food associated with it have evolved over many centuries from its Austronesian origins to a mixed cuisine of Malay, Spanish, Chinese, and American influences adapted to indigenous ingredients and the local palate.

== Philippine desserts ==
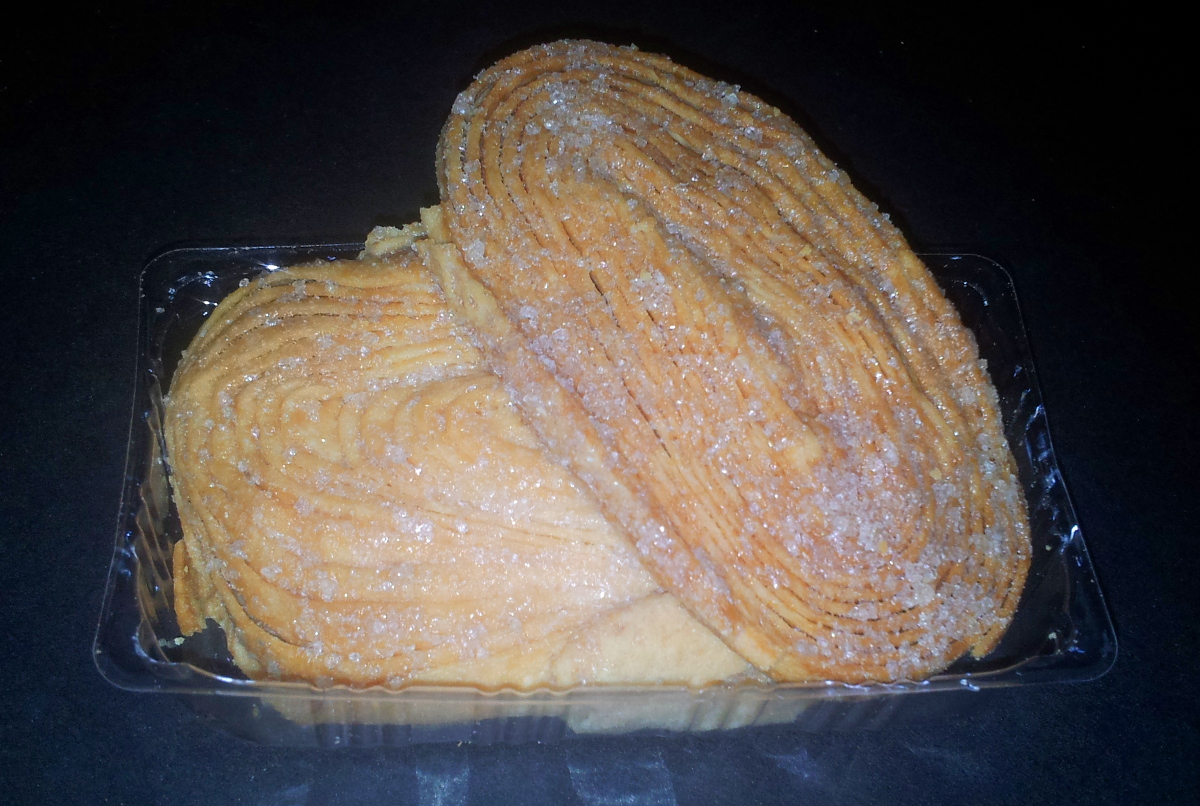
Otap

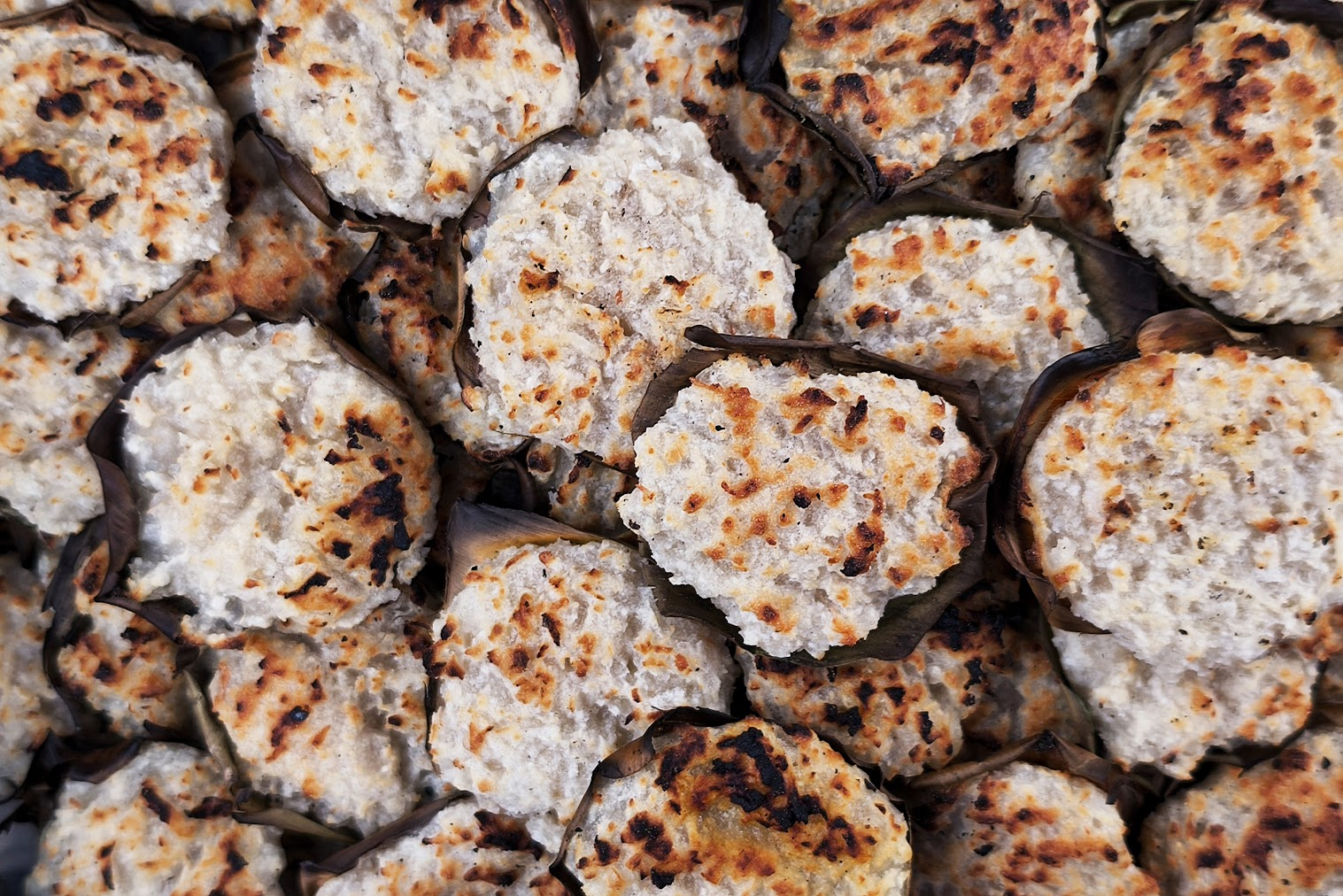
Iloilo Native Bibingka

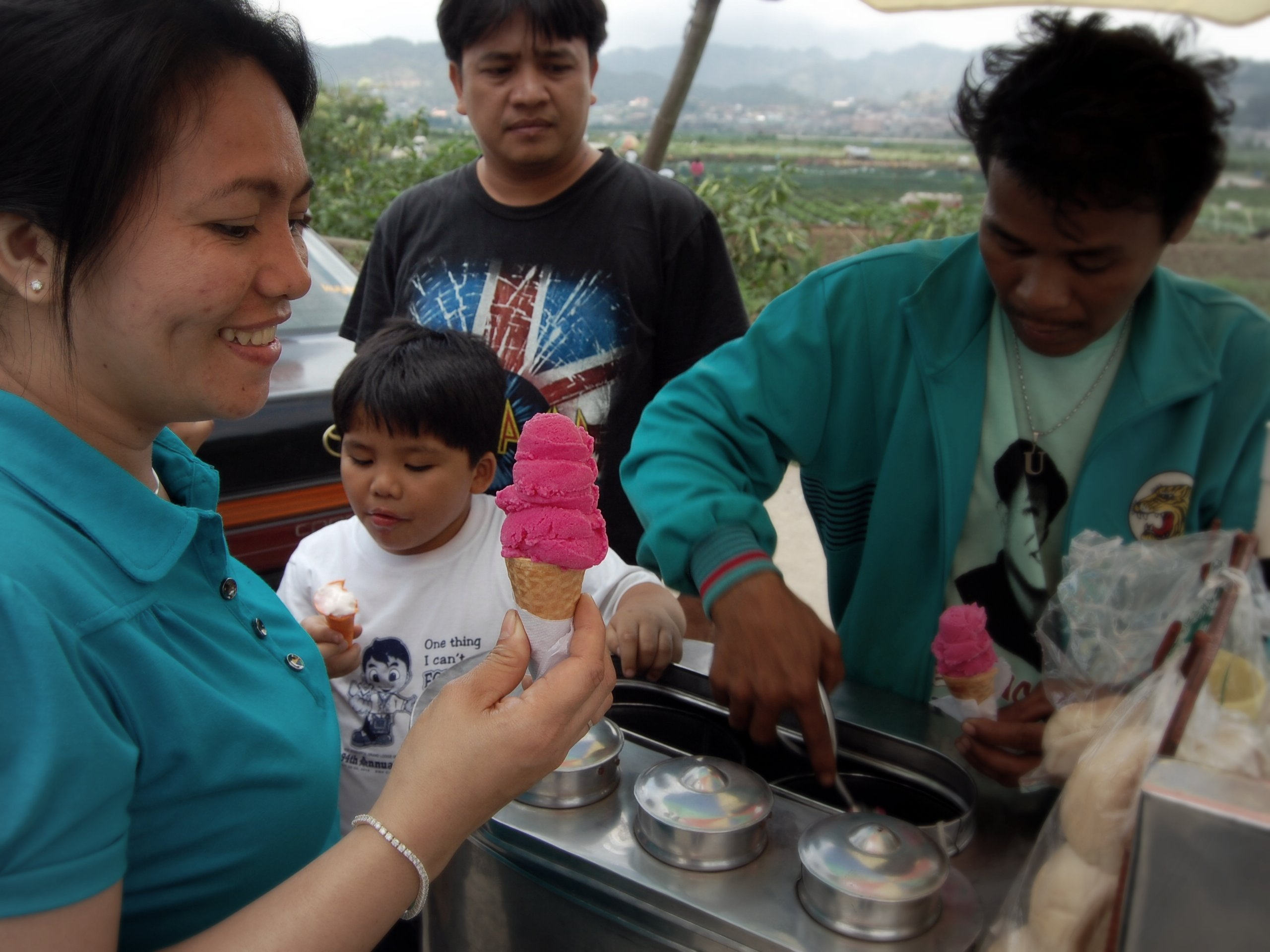
Sorbetes

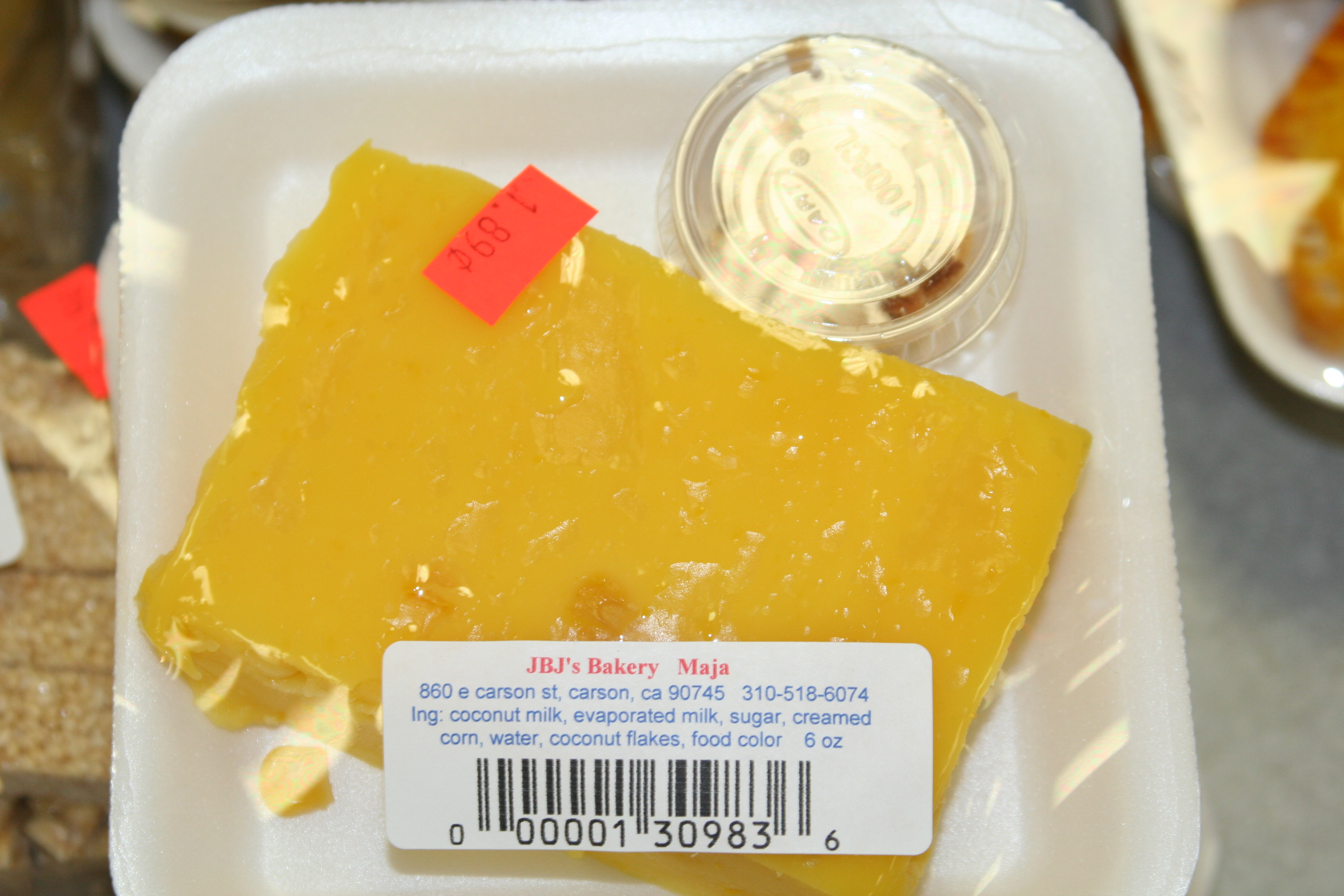
Corn maja blanca

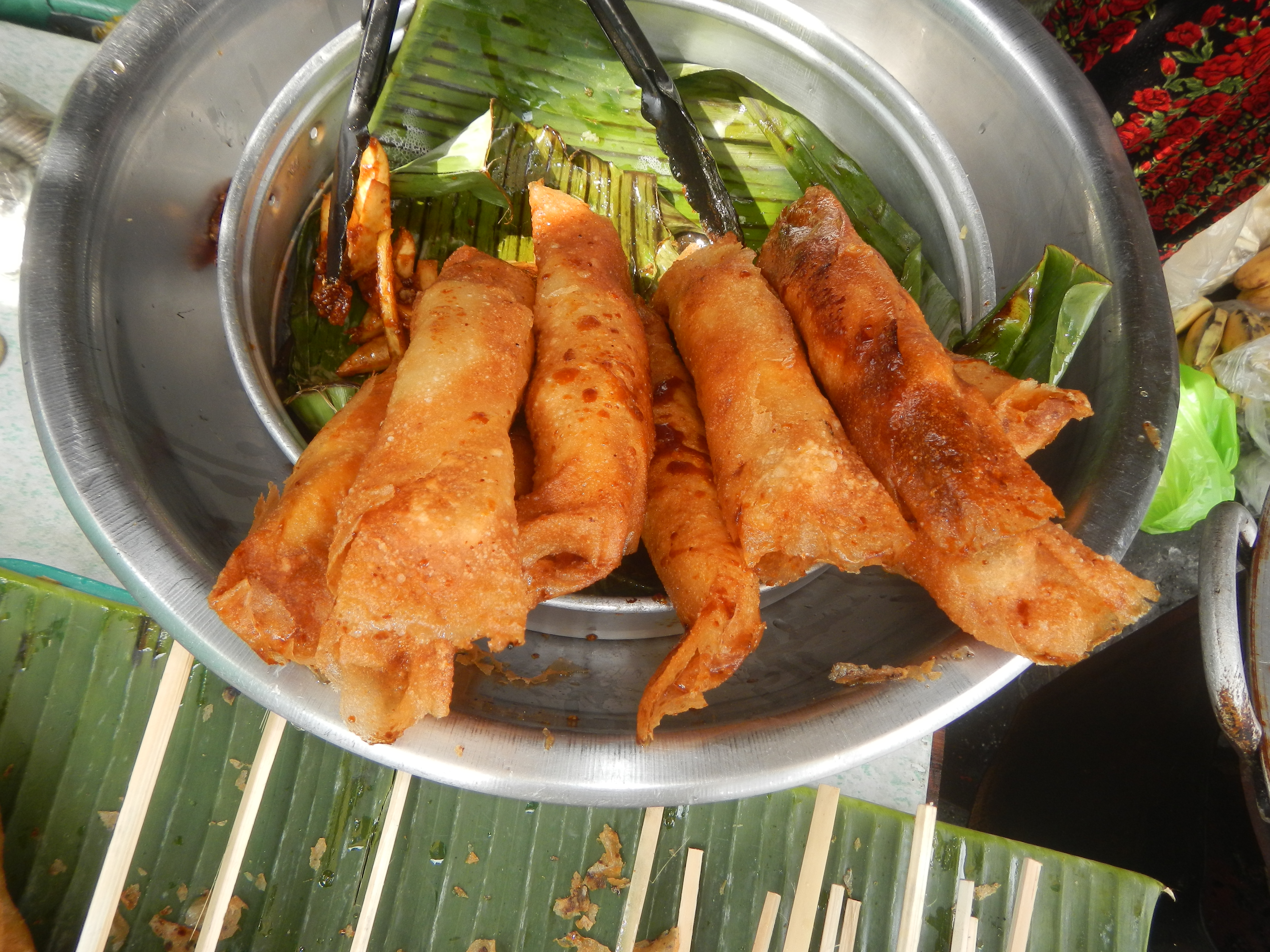
Turon

- Alfajor - Dulce de Leche sandwich cookie
- Apas - Sugar crusted biscuits
- Alembong - Ube bar
- Ampaw
- Bakpia - Bean paste filled moon cake
- Balikucha
- Banana cue - Carmelised, fried plantain skewers
- Barquillo
- Barquiron
- Baye baye - Rolled pudding of coconut and rice or corn flour
- Belekoy - chewy candy strips dotted with sesame
- Bibingka - Christmas time coconut-rice cake
- Biko - Fudge like rice cake flavoured with caramel, ginger and coconut milk
- Bilo-bilo
- Binagol
- Binaki
- Binangkal
- Binatog - A street food of boiled corn topped with grated coconut, sugar and butter
- Binignit
- Biskotso - Twice-baked bread slices coated with butter, sugar and sometimes garlic.
- Brazo de Mercedes - a rolled meringue cake filled with a custard
- Bukayo - coconut noodles cooked in caramel
- Buko pie – a traditional baked young-coconut (malauhog) custard pie
- Buko pandan cake
- Buko salad and variants such as Buko pandan
- Camote cue - Deep fried and caramelised skewers of camote (sweet potato) slices
- Cascaron
- Cassava cake
- Caycay
- Coconut toffee
- Crema de fruta
- Daral
- Donat Bai
- Dodol
- Egg pie
- Ensaymada
- Espasol
- Flan cake
- Food for the gods
- Galletas de patatas
- Galletas pesquera
- Ginanggang
- Ginataan
- Ginataang kolo
- Ginataang mais
- Ginataang munggo
- Guinomis
- Gulaman
- Gulaman with fruit cocktail (firm molded jelly variant)
- Halo-halo
- Himugo
- Ibos
- Ice buko
- Inday inday
- Inipit
- Inumoe
- Iskrambol
- Kababayan(muffin) - Filipin sweet muffins
- Kalamay
- Kumukunsi
- Kutsinta
- Lamaw and variants such as Avocado lamaw, Papaya lamaw, and Melon lamaw
- Latik
- Leche flan
- Lokot-lokot
- Lumpiang keso
- Mache
- Maíz con hielo
- Maja blanca
- Mamón and Taisan variant
- Mango cake
- Mango float
- Maruya
- Masa podrida
- Masi
- Moche
- Molido candy
- Monay and Pinagong variant
- Moron
- Nata de coco
- Nilagang saging
- Nilupak
- Otap
- Palitaw
- Pan Bisaya (Salvaro)
- Pan de coco
- Pan de siosa
- Panutsang mani
- Panyalam
- Pastel de Camiguin
- Pastillas
- Piaya
- Pilipit
- Pinasugbo
- Pitsi-pitsî
- Polvorón
- Pulot
- Puto bumbong
- Puto seco
- Putok
- Roscas
- Rosquillo
- Salukara
- Sans rival
- Sapin-sapin
- Sayongsong
- Shakoy
- Silvana
- Sorbetes – the traditional variation of ice cream made in the Philippines, it is uniquely made from coconut milk, unlike other iced desserts that are made from animal milk.
- Suman
- Taho
- Tupig
- Turón
- Turku - Filipino version of Turkish delight called Turku or sweet jelly in Filipino
- Ube cake
- Ube cheesecake
- Ube Langka (candy)
- Ube ice cream
- Ube halaya
- Uraró
- Yema
- Yema cake

== See also ==
- List of desserts
- List of Philippine dishes
