= Custard cake =

Custard cake can refer to

- Flan cake, a Filipino dessert made with chiffon or sponge cake topped with a layer of crème caramel
- Flancocho, a Puerto Rican dessert made with a sponge cake topped with a layer of crème caramel and cream cheese
- Mille-feuille or custard slice, a French pastry with alternating layers of pastry cream and puff pastry
- Yema cake, a Filipino chiffon cake with a custard filling
- An old name for Boston cream pie

== See also ==
- List of custard desserts
