= Meringue =

Type of dessert or candy

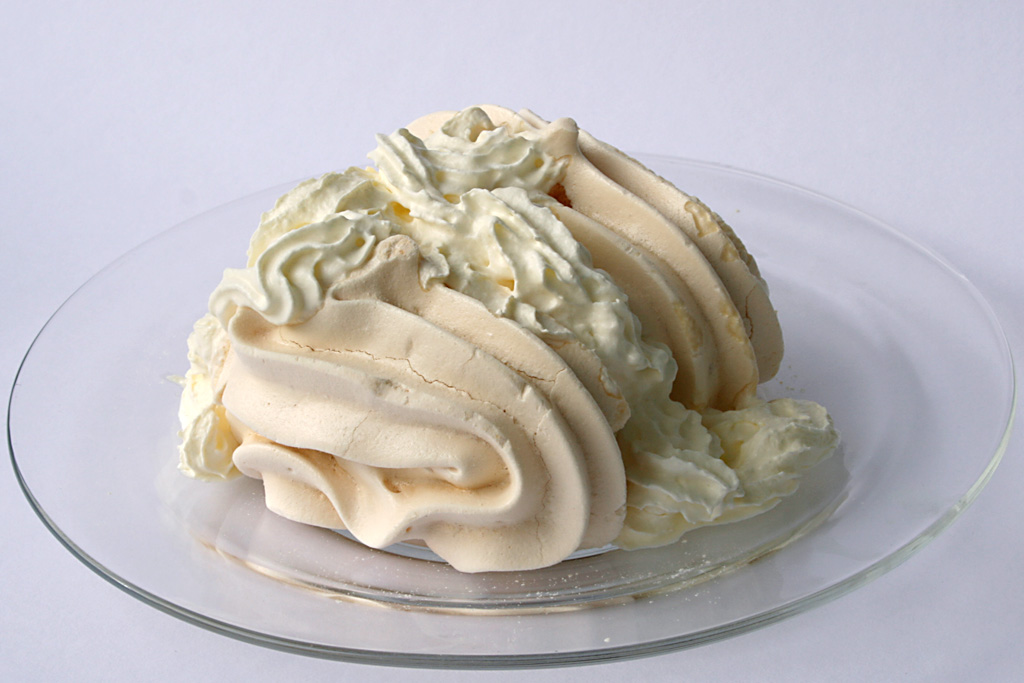
- Meringue with whipped cream
- Alternative names: Meringa (in Italy); Beza (in Poland); Suspiros or Merengue (in Portugal and in Brazil); Sneg (in Slovenia); Puslice (in Croatia, Serbia, Bosnia and Herzegovina and Montenegro); Habcsók (in Hungary); Mafishe or Pufka (in Albania)
- Type: Dessert
- Place of origin: France, Italy
- Region or state: Europe
- Main ingredients: Eggwhites, sugar

Meringue (/məˈræŋ/ mə-RANG, French: [məʁɛ̃ɡ]) is a type of dessert or candy, traditionally made from whipped egg whites and sugar, and occasionally an acidic ingredient such as lemon, vinegar, or cream of tartar. A binding agent such as salt, flour, or gelatin may also be added to the eggs. The key to the formation of a good meringue is the formation of stiff peaks by denaturing the protein ovalbumin (a protein in the egg whites) via mechanical shear.

They are light, airy, and sweet confections. Homemade meringues are often chewy and soft with a crisp exterior, while many commercial meringues are crisp throughout. A uniform crisp texture may be achieved at home by baking at a low temperature (80–90 °C or 176–194 °F) for an extended period of up to two hours.

== History ==
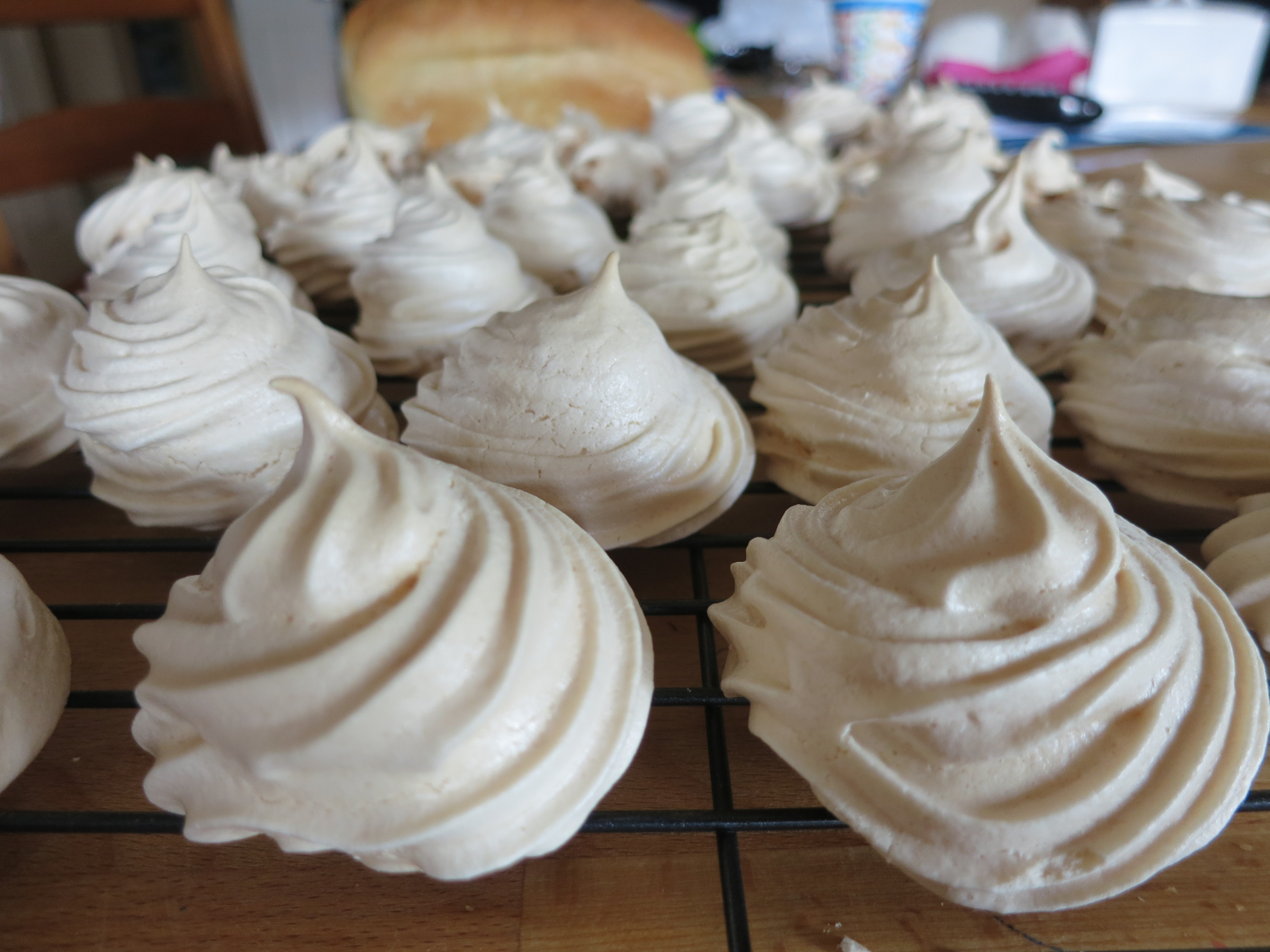
Home-made meringues

The Oxford English Dictionary states that the French word is of unknown origin. The name meringue for this confection first appeared in print in 1691 in François Massialot's cookbook Le Cuisiner royal et bourgeois. The word meringue first appeared in English in 1706 in a translation of Massialot's book.

According to several food historians, the first documented recipe recognizable as meringues is the one for confections called "white biskit bread", published in 1604 in a recipe book by Elinor Fettiplace (c. 1570 – c. 1647) of Gloucestershire, however, one of the ingredients was flour. A similar one, called "pets", can be found in the manuscript of collected recipes written by Lady Rachel Fane (1612/13 – 1680) of Knole, Kent. Slowly baked meringues are still referred to as "pets" in the Loire region of France due to their light and fluffy texture.

Meringues were traditionally shaped between two large spoons, as they are generally at home today. Meringue piped through a pastry bag was introduced by Antonin Carême.

== Chemistry ==
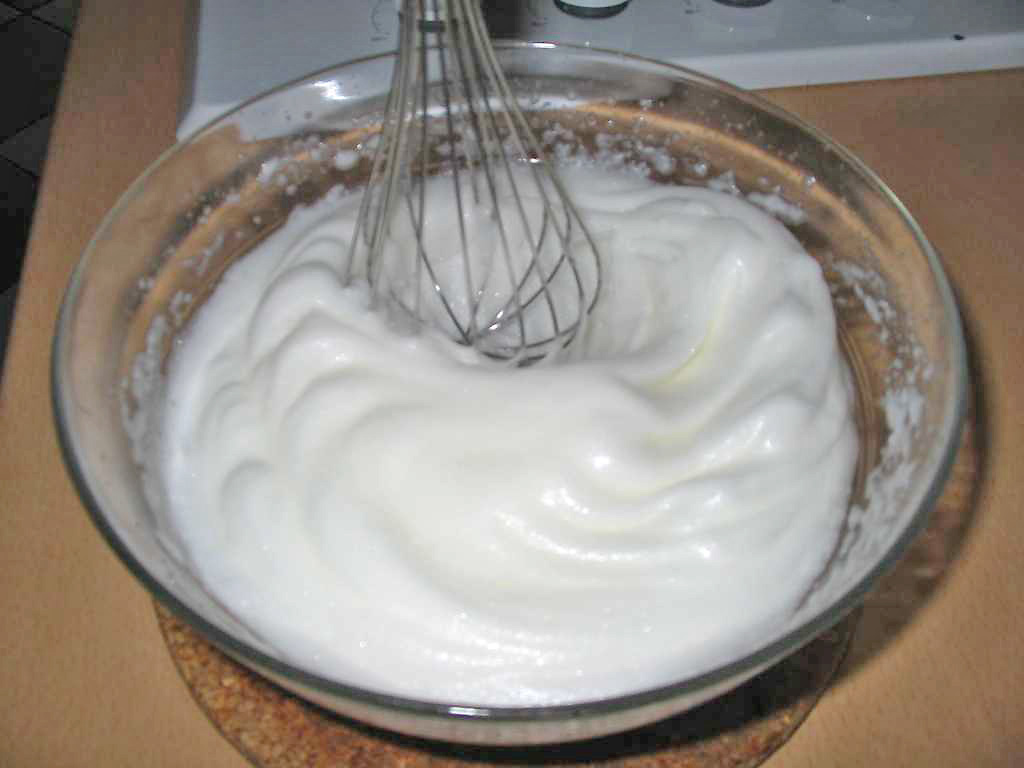
Beaten egg whites

Protein distribution in egg whites is as follows: (54%) ovalbumin, (13%) conalbumin/ ovotransferrin, (11%) ovomucoid, (4%) ovoglobulins, (3.5%) lysozyme, and (2%) ovomucin. Ovoglobulins drive foaming, ovomucin is the main stabilization agent, and the remainder of the proteins interact to contribute to overall foaming and stability. When egg whites are beaten, some of the hydrogen bonds in the proteins break, causing the proteins to unfold ("denature") and to aggregate non-specifically. When these egg white proteins denature (due to agitation from beating), their hydrophobic regions are exposed and the formation of intermolecular protein-protein interactions is promoted. These protein-protein interactions, usually disulfide bridges, create networks responsible for the structure of the foam and this change in structure leads to the stiff consistency required for meringues. The use of a copper bowl, or the addition of cream of tartar is required to additionally denature the proteins to create the firm peaks, otherwise the whites will not be firm.

When beating egg whites, they are classified in three stages according to the peaks they form when the beater is lifted: soft, firm, and stiff peaks.

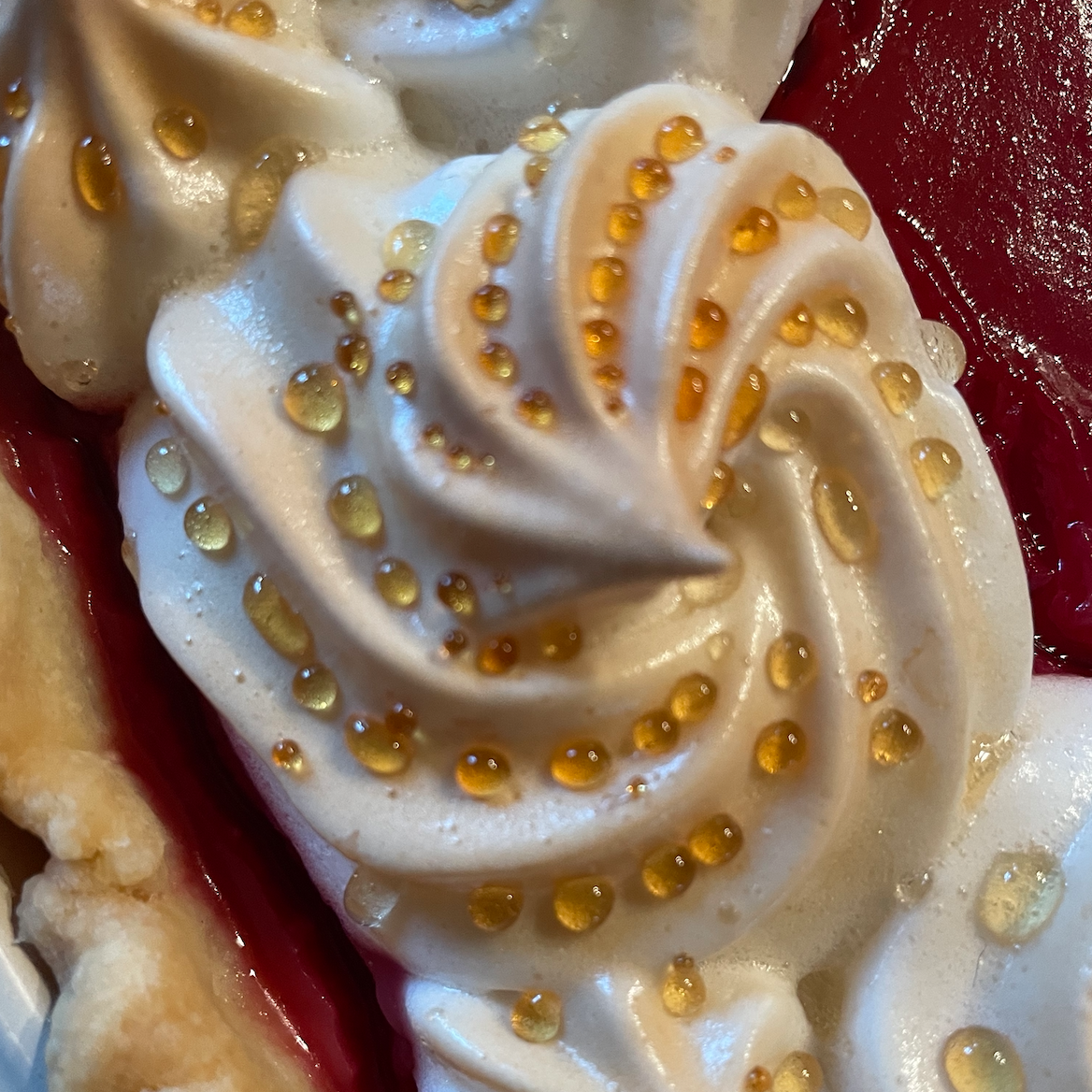
Beads of golden liquid can form on meringue when it is overcooked, undercooked, stored in a refrigerator, or made on a humid day. This is called weeping or sweating.

Egg whites and sugar are both hygroscopic (water-attracting) chemicals. Consequently, meringue becomes soggy when refrigerated or stored in a high-humidity environment. This quality also explains the problem called "weeping" or "sweating", in which beads of moisture form on all surfaces of the meringue. It can also happen if the meringue is undercooked (resulting in a puddle of liquid under the meringue) or overcooked (resulting in beading on top). Sweating is a particular problem for French meringues in which the granulated sugar is inadequately dissolved in the egg whites, and for high-moisture pie fillings.

== Compound interactions ==
There are three main ingredients in a meringue recipe that interact to form the foam structure: egg whites, sugar, and cream of tartar or acid. The backbone of the foam structure is made up of proteins, amino acid chains. Egg whites provide the meringue with necessary proteins that form the meringue foam. The proteins are originally oriented in a tangled ball but must be uncoiled into strands; this is referred to as denaturation. There are two ways a protein can be denatured: through physical or chemical process. When forming a meringue the egg whites are beat until the proteins are denatured—a physical process. Also by beating the egg whites, air is incorporated into the protein structure creating an air–water protein mixture interface. The friction from beating the eggs adds heat to the process, which causes the proteins to increase in elasticity. As the proteins are being stretched during the denaturation process they are also coagulating together forming a protein network. After the denaturation process the egg whites will become six to eight times their original size. If the proteins are beat for too long they will become stretched out too far and become too weak to support the foam structure.

Cream of tartar, also known as potassium hydrogen tartrate, KC_{4}H_{5}O_{6}, is added to the egg whites before the denaturation process. Cream of tartar is an acid that is used to help stabilize and coagulate the proteins, which aids in a stronger protein network to trap air for the foam formation. Cream of tartar has a low pH to help bring the proteins near their isoelectric point to allow them to be denatured easier. The isoelectric point is a specific pH where a molecule, in this case protein, has no net electrical charge. The electrical charge on a protein would normally hold the protein together in its coiled clump.

The cream of tartar also acts as a catalyst affecting the sugar structure. Sucrose is a disaccharide made up of glucose and fructose. Cream of tartar inverts the sugar during the baking process, meaning the molecule is split into two parts containing glucose and fructose. This prevents the sugar from recrystallizing and giving the meringue a gritty, undesirable texture.

Sugar is the final ingredient that is used to help form and stabilize the foam structure. Sugar is hydrophilic, extracting water out of the egg whites. This will lighten the protein network, allowing the foam to be stronger and more elastic. The sugar dissolves in the protein network but does not become part of the protein network. The sugar must be added slowly to the egg whites, while continuously mixing. If it is added all at once, it will not be evenly distributed, causing the protein network to collapse due to the weight of the sugar in one area of the meringue.

After a strong protein network has formed a complete foam, the meringue is ready to be baked. Adding heat to the mixture is the final step to strengthen the foam structure. The meringue must be baked at a low temperature for a long period of time. This allows the proteins to finish coagulating, strengthening the meringue evenly throughout. If the proteins are not baked evenly, the bottom of the meringue will not be able to support the structural weight, causing the meringue to collapse. The heat causes the air bubbles to expand, creating an airier structure. The water in the structure evaporates, causing the meringue to become lighter with a stronger foam structure. It is important to not evaporate all of the water out of the meringue, as some water is necessary to hold the foam together.

== Uses ==
=== Cookies ===
Meringue cookies are baked at a very low heat, for a long time. Another name for them is forgotten cookies, as they can be left in an oven for a long time after the cooking is done. They are not supposed to become tan at all, but they need to be very crisp and dry. They will keep for at least a week if stored in an airtight container.

=== Desserts ===
Meringue can be used as the basis for various desserts, including baked Alaska, bruttiboni, dacquoise, Esterházy torte, Eton mess, floating island, key lime pie, Kyiv cake, lemon meringue pie, macarons, merveilleux, pavlova, Queen of Puddings, sans rival, silvana, Spanische Windtorte, turrón, and Zuger Kirschtorte. In some recipes, the meringue may be cooked at a higher temperature for a shorter amount of time, resulting in a soft meringue with slightly browned peaks on top. Meringue by itself is also a dessert called "meringue kisses". In Switzerland, meringues are often associated with Gruyère cream.

Another dish is meringue de angel, which consists of shortbread layered with meringue and lemon curd, topped off with drizzled lemon glaze. Variations include assorted fruits such as raspberries, peaches, mangoes, cherries, strawberries, blueberries, blackberries, pineapple, papayas, honeydew, oranges, and cantaloupe.

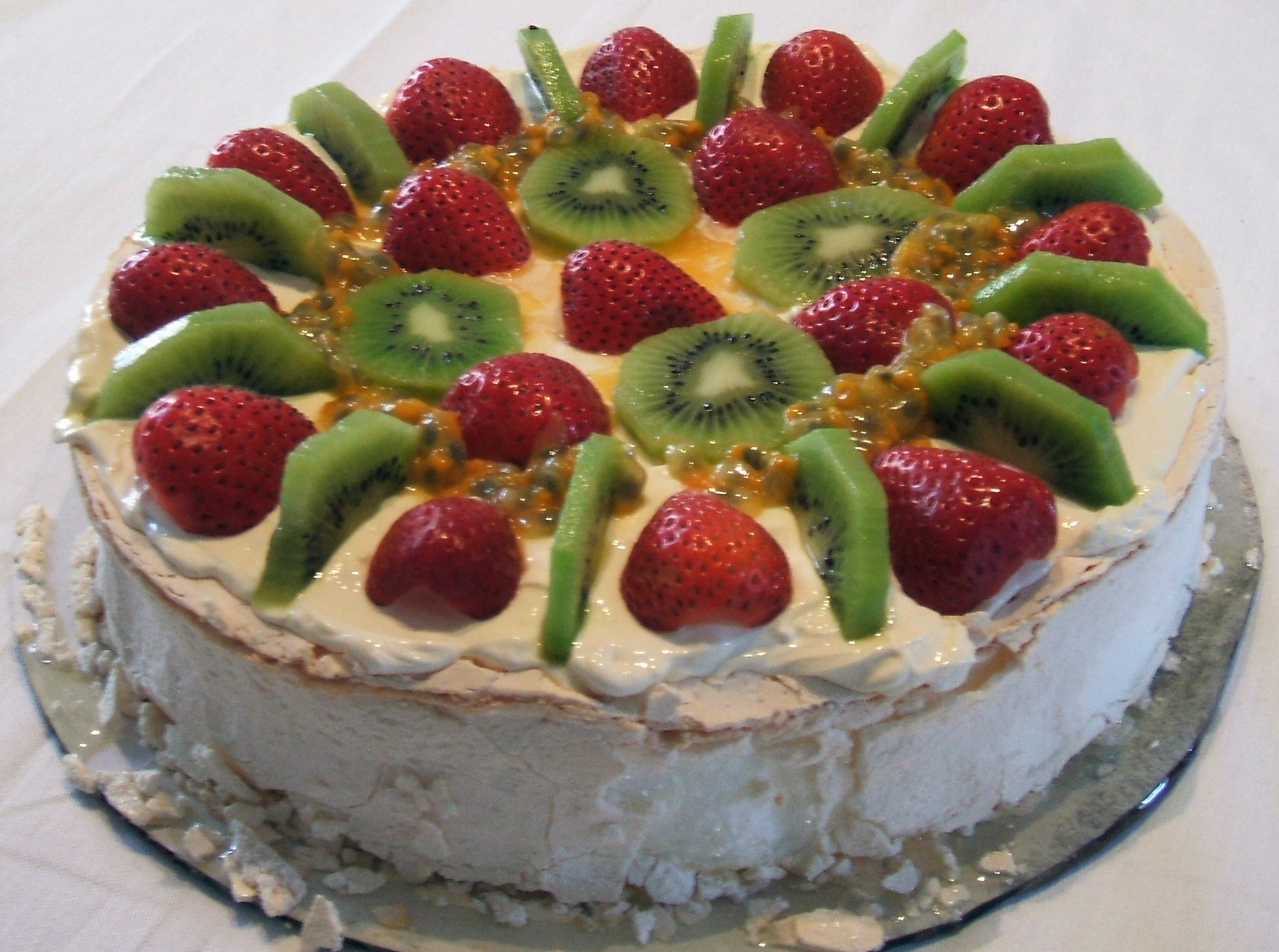
Pavlova, a meringue-based dessert of Australian and New Zealand origin

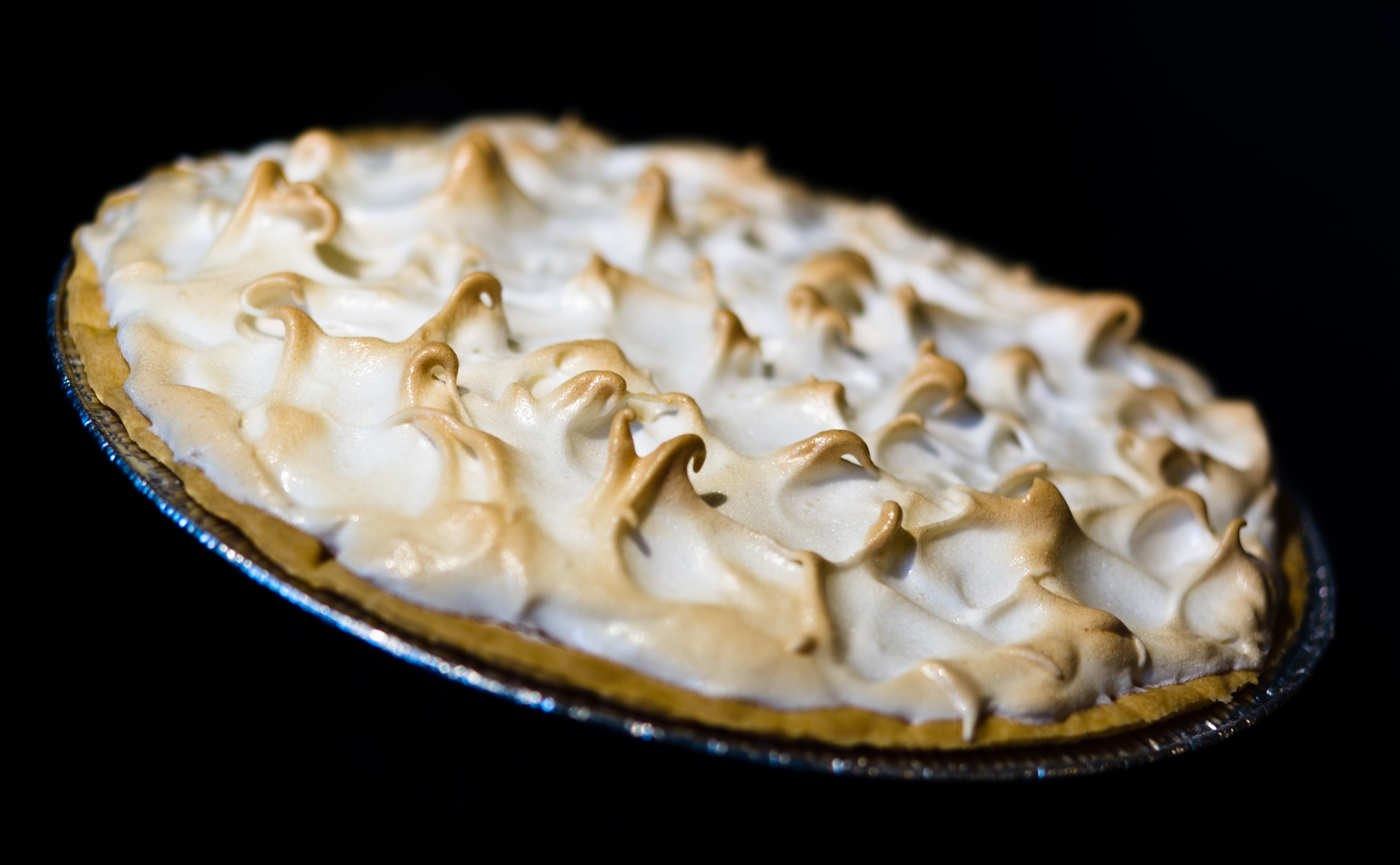
Lemon meringue pie with browned meringue peaks

=== Embellishment ===
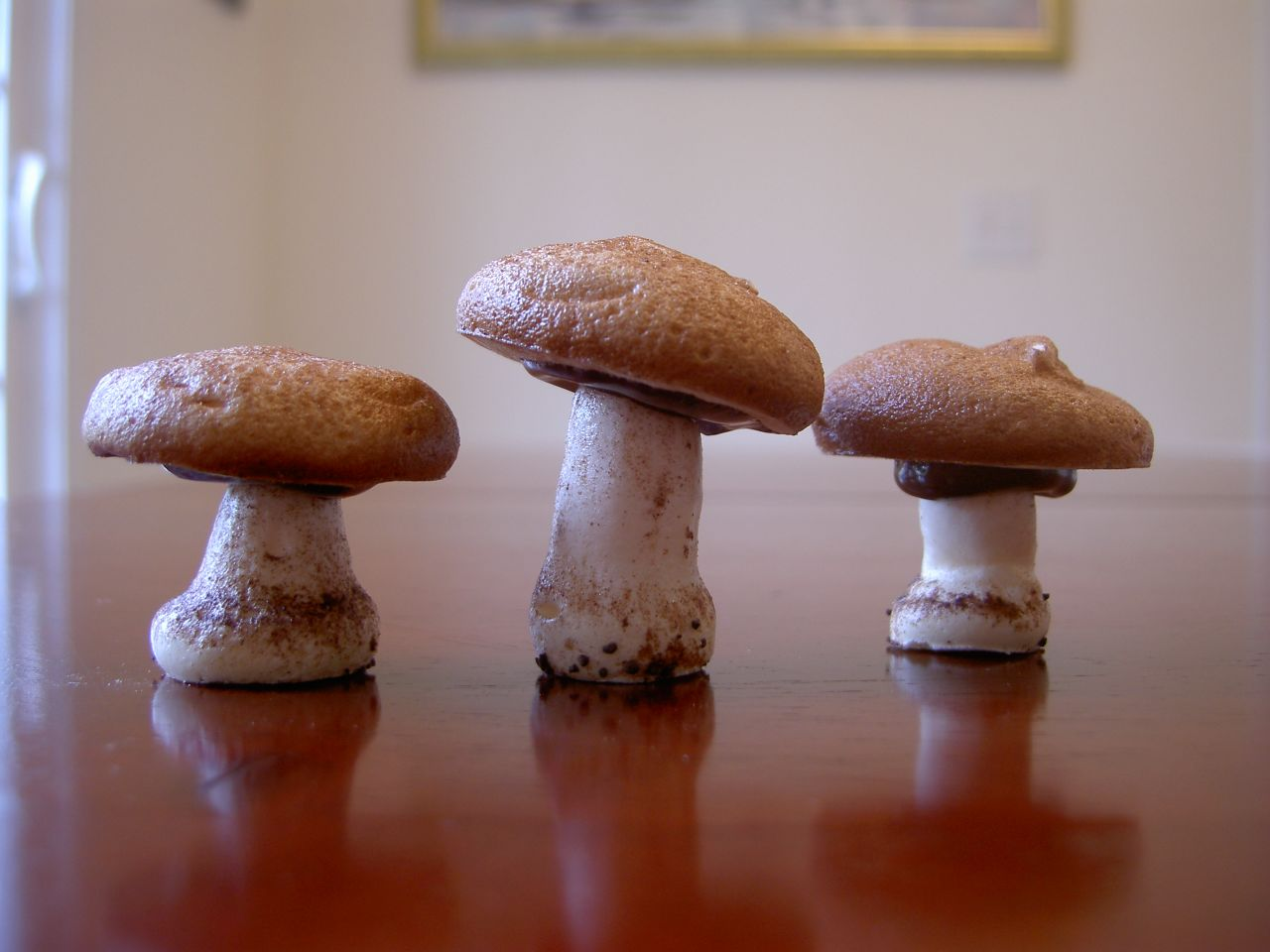
Meringue mushrooms

It is possible to use meringue for decoration. It can be created in cute shapes like mushrooms, or be piped into a crisp basket, baked and stuffed with cake, fruit or flowers.

== Shelf life ==
Meringue is not a stable structure and has a short shelf life of about two weeks if stored properly. Meringue is a hygroscopic food, thus it absorbs water from the air. The high sugar concentration in the meringue absorbs moisture from the air and will cause the meringue to become soft and chewy. The more water that is absorbed, the heavier the meringue becomes. After enough water is absorbed, the meringue will become too heavy for the foam structure to support itself, and it will start to collapse. Meringue is so susceptible to absorbing water that a rainy day may disrupt the foam structure formation and make it impossible to form a meringue.

Storing meringues in an airtight container will prevent humidity from affecting the sugar. It is also recommended to store the meringue in a cooler area. If the meringue is stored in these conditions, its shelf life will be about two weeks. To extend the shelf life up to about three months, the meringue can be stored in the freezer. The colder temperatures in the freezer decrease the humidity. The meringue should still be stored in an airtight container, preventing water from affecting the meringue.

== Nutritional content ==
The principal nutritional components are protein from the egg whites and simple carbohydrates from the refined sugar.

== See also ==
- List of egg dishes
- Divinity (confectionery)
- Marshmallow creme
- Culinary Heritage of Switzerland
