= Nilagang saging =

Filipino dish of boiled bananas dipped in fermented fish paste

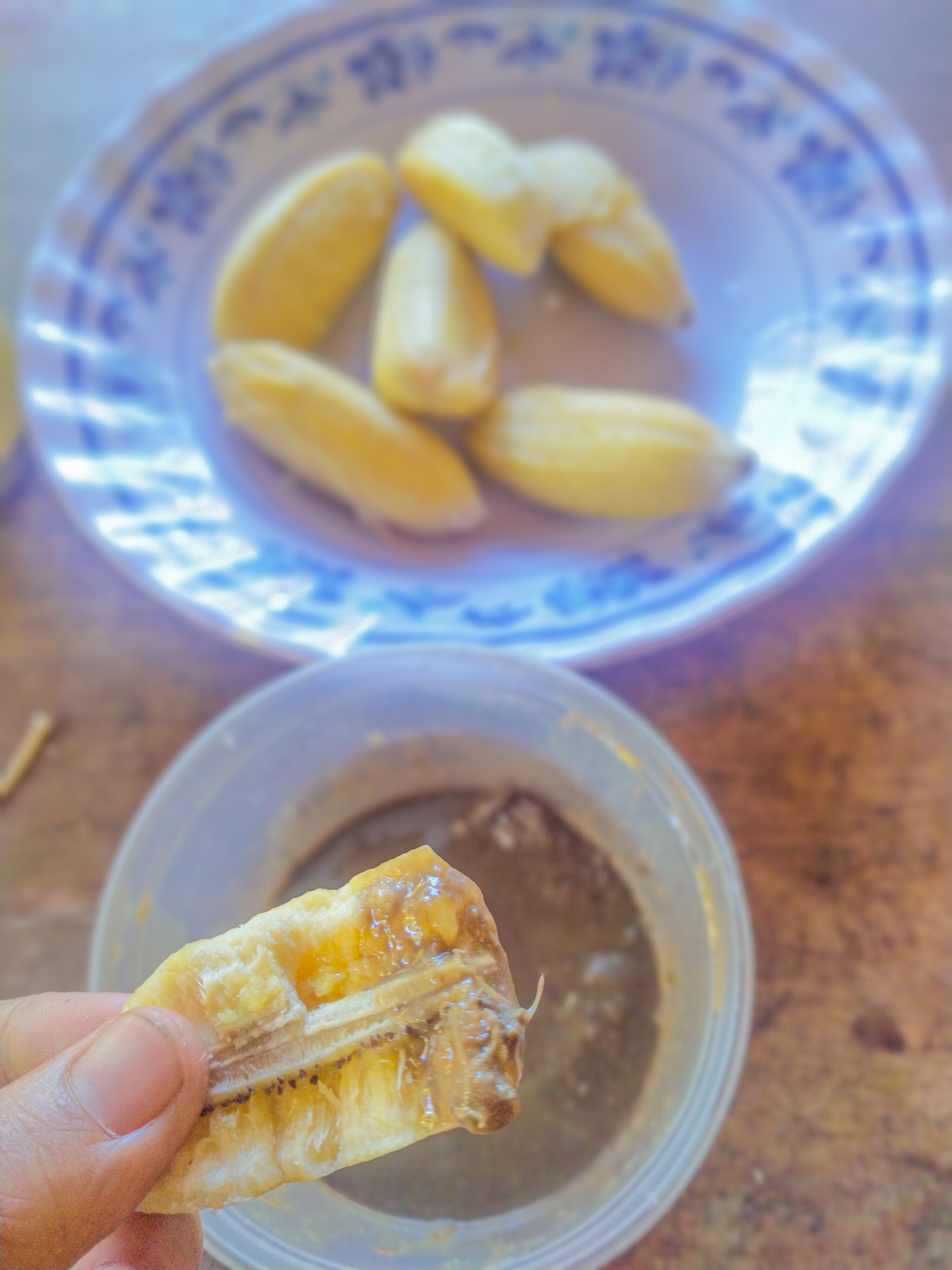
- Nilagang saging with bagoong na isda (fermented fish paste)
- Alternative names: Nilagang saging na saba, Nilagang saba, Nilung-ag na saging, Linung-ag na saging
- Region or state: Philippines
- Main ingredients: Saba banana, Bagoong (fermented fish paste)

Nilagang saging, sometimes also known simply as boiled bananas, is a simple Filipino dish consisting of boiled saba bananas (or cardava bananas) commonly dipped in fermented fish paste (bagoong na isda, also called ginamos in Cebuano). The bananas are typically unripe or just about to ripen, when they are still starchy. Nilagang saging is regarded as a comfort food and is a common savory snack in rural areas of the Philippines, usually eaten for merienda. It is sometimes also sold as street food.

== See also ==
- Minatamis na saging
- Banana cue
- Ginanggang
- Maruya
