= Panocha =

Pudding

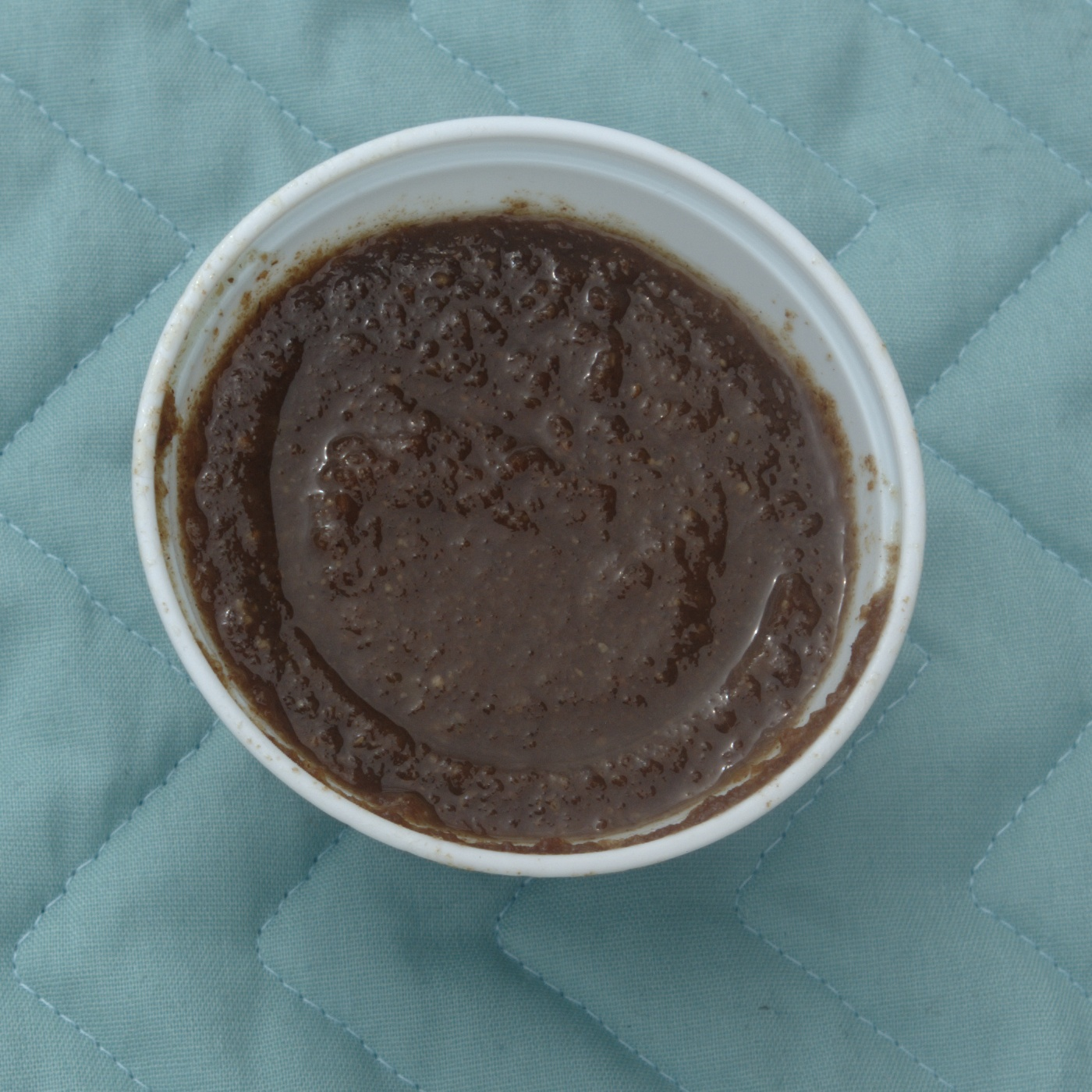
- Small serving of panocha from Chimayó, New Mexico
- Type: Pudding
- Place of origin: United States
- Region or state: New Mexico southern Colorado
- Main ingredients: Ground sprouted wheat flour, piloncillo

Panocha is a pudding made from ground sprouted wheat and piloncillo in New Mexico and southern Colorado. It is traditionally eaten during Lent. The sprouted-wheat flour is called "panocha flour" or simply "panocha".

In the Philippines, panocha (also spelled panutsa or panotsa) is the Spanish term for sangkaka, a traditional native jaggery made in halved coconut shells. The term is also used to refer to a type of peanut brittle in the Philippines (more properly panocha mani).
