= Ube cheesecake =

Filipino cheesecake colored purple with yams

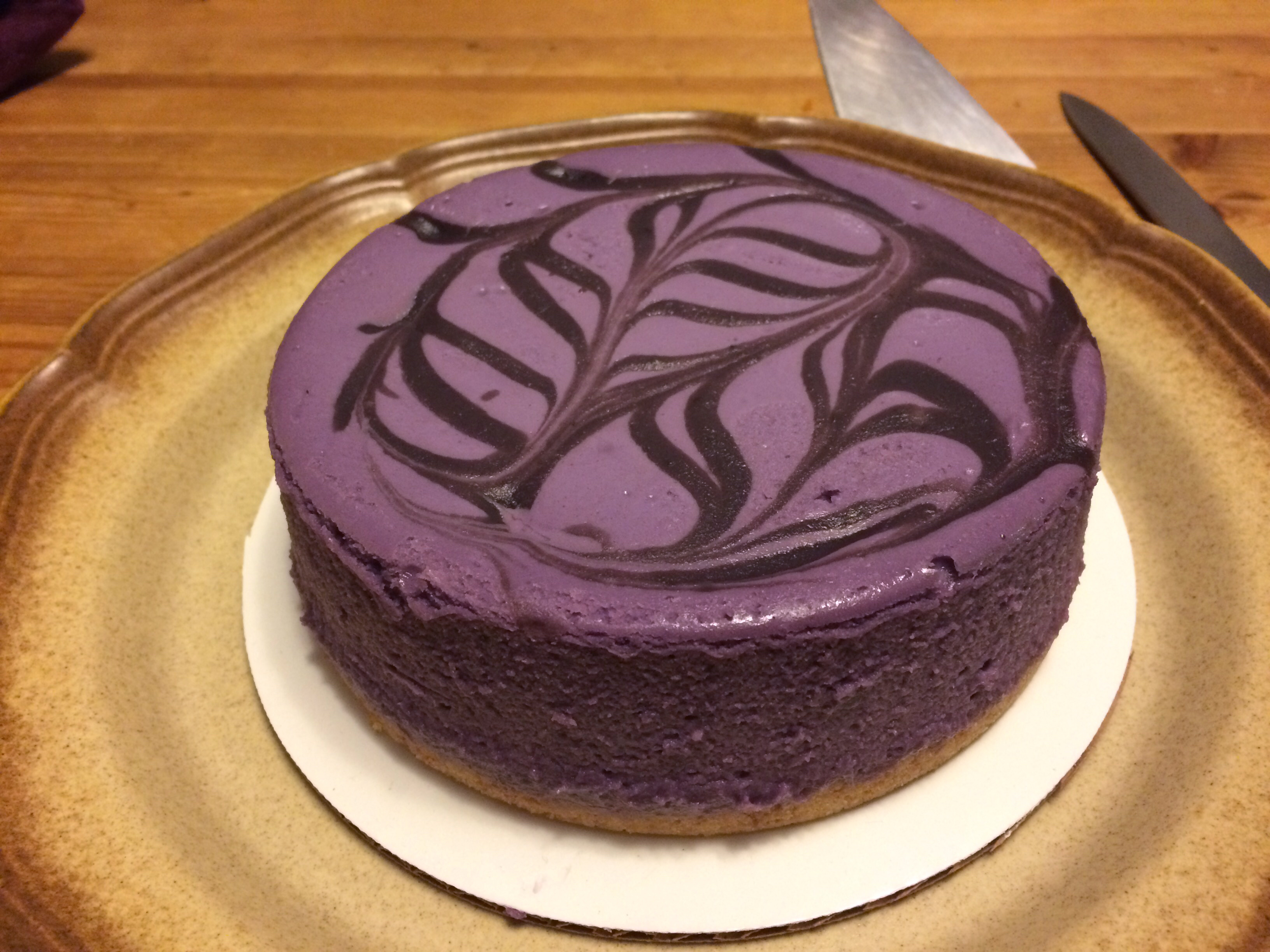
- Course: Dessert
- Place of origin: Philippines
- Serving temperature: Cold
- Main ingredients: Ube halaya, cream cheese

Ube cheesecake, also known as purple yam cheesecake, is a Filipino cheesecake made with a base of crushed graham crackers and an upper layer of cream cheese and ube halaya (mashed purple yam with milk, sugar, and butter). It can be prepared baked or simply refrigerated. Like other ube desserts, it is characteristically purple in color.

== Description ==
Ube cheesecake is usually prepared with a base made of crushed graham crackers (cookies, digestive biscuits, and broas can also be used), sugar, and butter. The ingredients are mixed, molded into the desired form, then refrigerated until it has set. Ube halaya is prepared separately, either by making it traditionally or by using store-bought ube halaya in jars. It is mixed with cream cheese, vanilla extract, and (optionally) condensed milk, then poured on top of the base. This layer is usually much thicker than the base. For baked versions, eggs are usually added. Both baked and unbaked versions are chilled before serving.

== Variants ==
Ube cheesecake can be made into cupcakes or bars. The ingredients can also be modified easily. For example, it can be made using traditional queso de bola, rather than cream cheese. It can also use a variety of toppings or additional ingredients in the base, including coconut, toasted peanuts, whipped cream, or buttercream.

== See also ==
- Brazo de Mercedes
- Crema de fruta
- Mango float
- Sans rival
- Silvana
- Ube cake
- Ube ice cream
