= Silvana (food) =

Filipino cookie

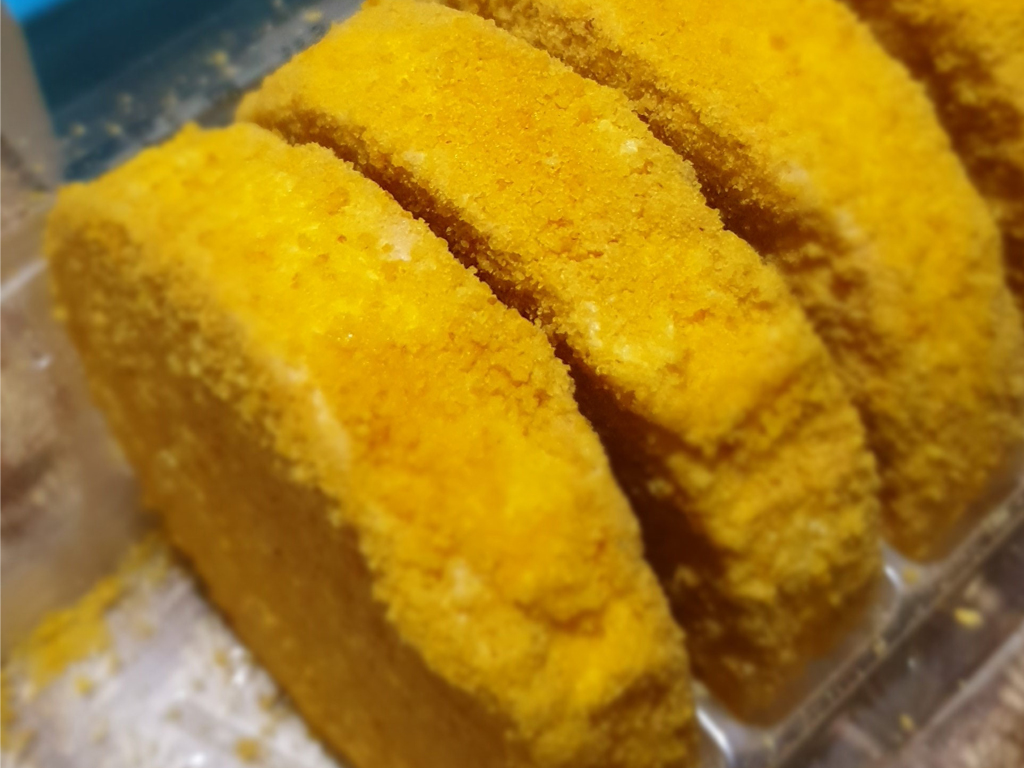
- Close-up of silvanas
- Alternative names: Sylvana, sylvanna
- Type: Cookie
- Place of origin: The Philippines
- Region or state: Dumaguete, Negros Oriental
- Main ingredients: Cashew-meringue wafers, buttercream, cookie crumbs

Silvanas, alternatively spelled as sylvanas or sylvannas, is a Filipino frozen cookie consisting of a layer of buttercream sandwiched between two cashew-meringue wafers coated with cookie crumbs. Silvanas are the cookie versions of the sans rival, a Filipino cake made from similar ingredients.

== See also ==
- Caycay
- Inipit
- Mango float
- Ube cheesecake
- List of cookies
