= Yema cake =

Filipino chiffon cake with custard filling

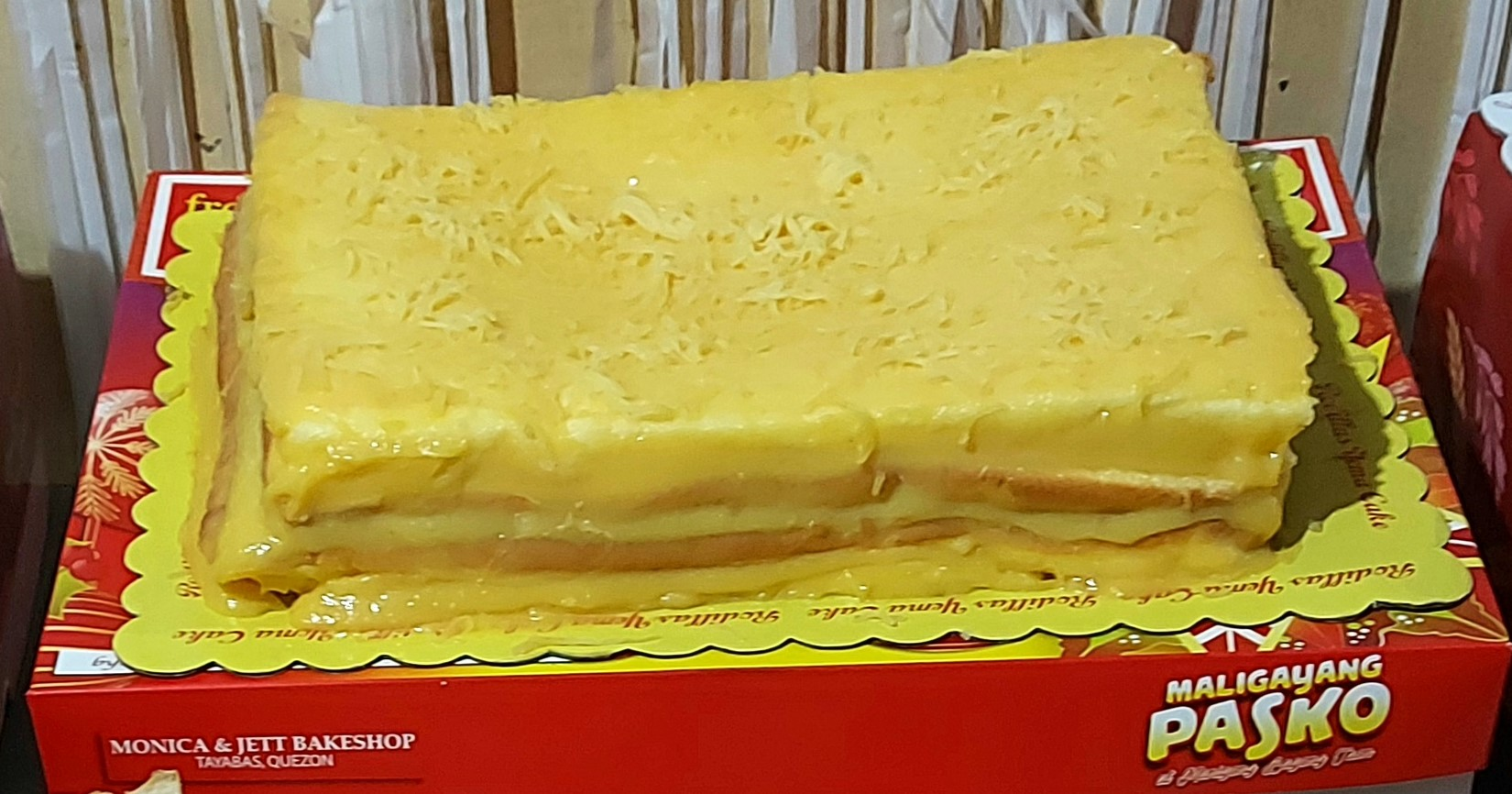
- A variant of yema cake.
- Alternative names: Yema chiffon cake
- Course: Dessert
- Place of origin: The Philippines
- Region or state: Quezon Province

Yema cake is a Filipino chiffon cake with a custard filling known as yema. It is generally prepared identically to mamón (chiffon cakes and sponge cakes in Filipino cuisine), with the only difference being that it incorporates yema either as frosting, as filling, or as part of the cake batter. Yema is a custard-like combination of milk and egg yolks. It is also typically garnished with grated cheese.

== See also ==
- Brazo de Mercedes
- Crema de fruta
- Flan cake
- Pastel de Camiguín
- Mango float
- Ube cake
- List of cakes
