= Caycay =

Filipino cookie

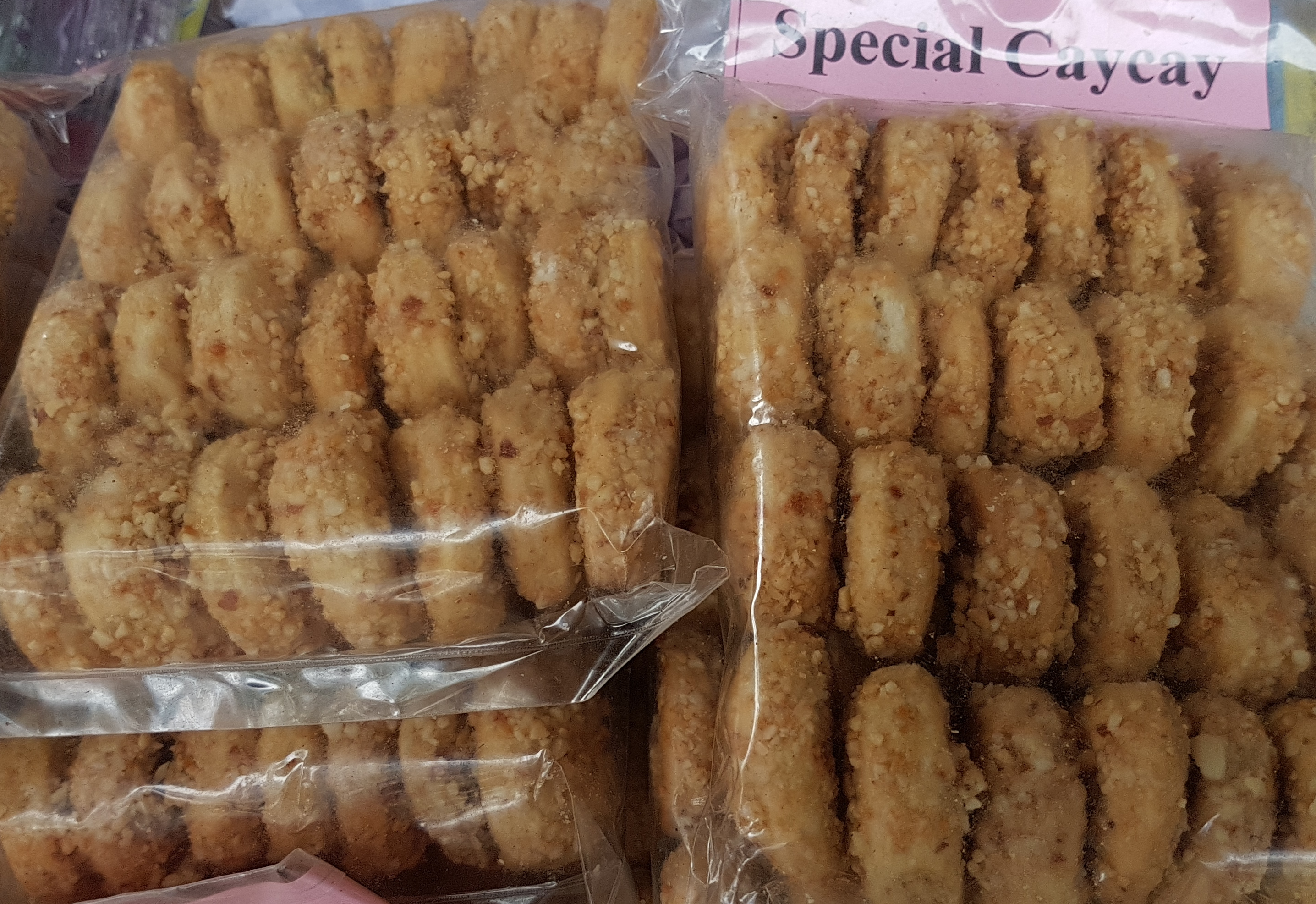
- Caycay
- Alternative names: Cay-cay
- Type: Cookie
- Place of origin: The Philippines
- Region or state: Bohol, Cebu

Caycay (pronounced [kaɪkaɪ]) is a Filipino crunchy layered cookie coated in syrup (latik) or honey and rolled in coarsely ground toasted peanuts. It originates from the islands of Bohol and Cebu and is a common specialty in the southern Visayas islands and Mindanao. The name comes from the verb kaykay which means "to dig up" in the Cebuano language, in reference to the step of coating the cookies in ground peanuts. Some versions coat the cookies in sesame seeds instead of peanuts.

== See also ==
- Panocha mani
- Pinasugbo
- Silvanas
- List of cookies
