= Inipit =

Traditional pastry in the Philippines

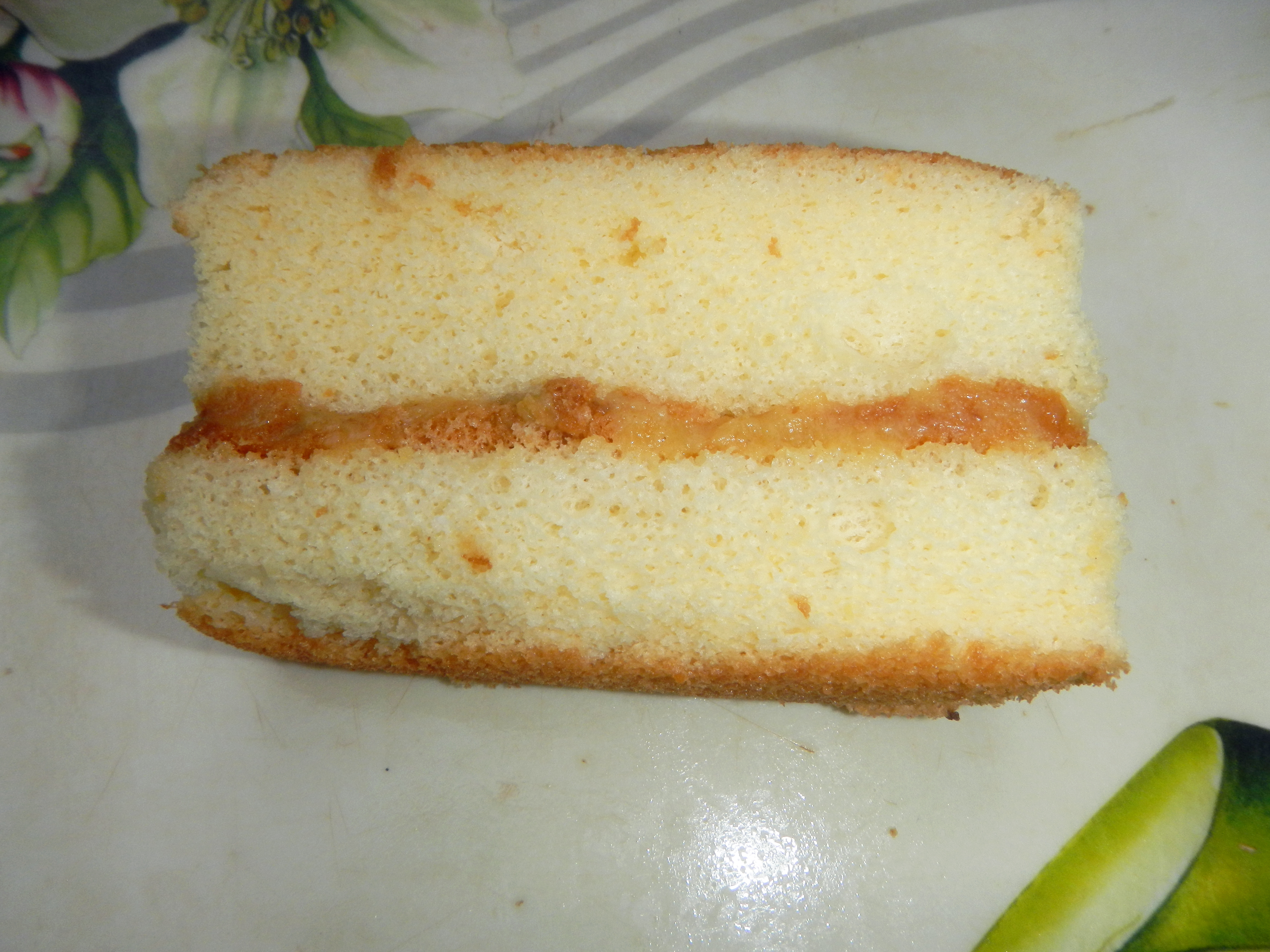
- A slice of Bulacan inipit
- Type: Dessert
- Place of origin: Philippines
- Region or state: Bulacan
- Main ingredients: Flour, milk, lard, sugar

Inipit is a Filipino flat dessert made of flour, milk, lard, and sugar that have various filling sandwiched in between two sheets of the sponge. The name inipit means "pressed in between" or "sandwiched" in Tagalog.

Originally, the filling consists of a sweetened mashed potato mixture but other fillings especially custard, buttercream, and ube have become more common in the modern times. The towns of Guiguinto and Malolos in Bulacan are well known for their inipit. Philippine snack brand Lemon Square, which is based in Meycauayan, Bulacan, is also known for the first mass-produced Inipit with leche flan, pandan, chocolate, and ube cheese flavors.

== See also ==
- Ube cheesecake
- List of pastries
