= Crema de fruta =

Filipino layer cake

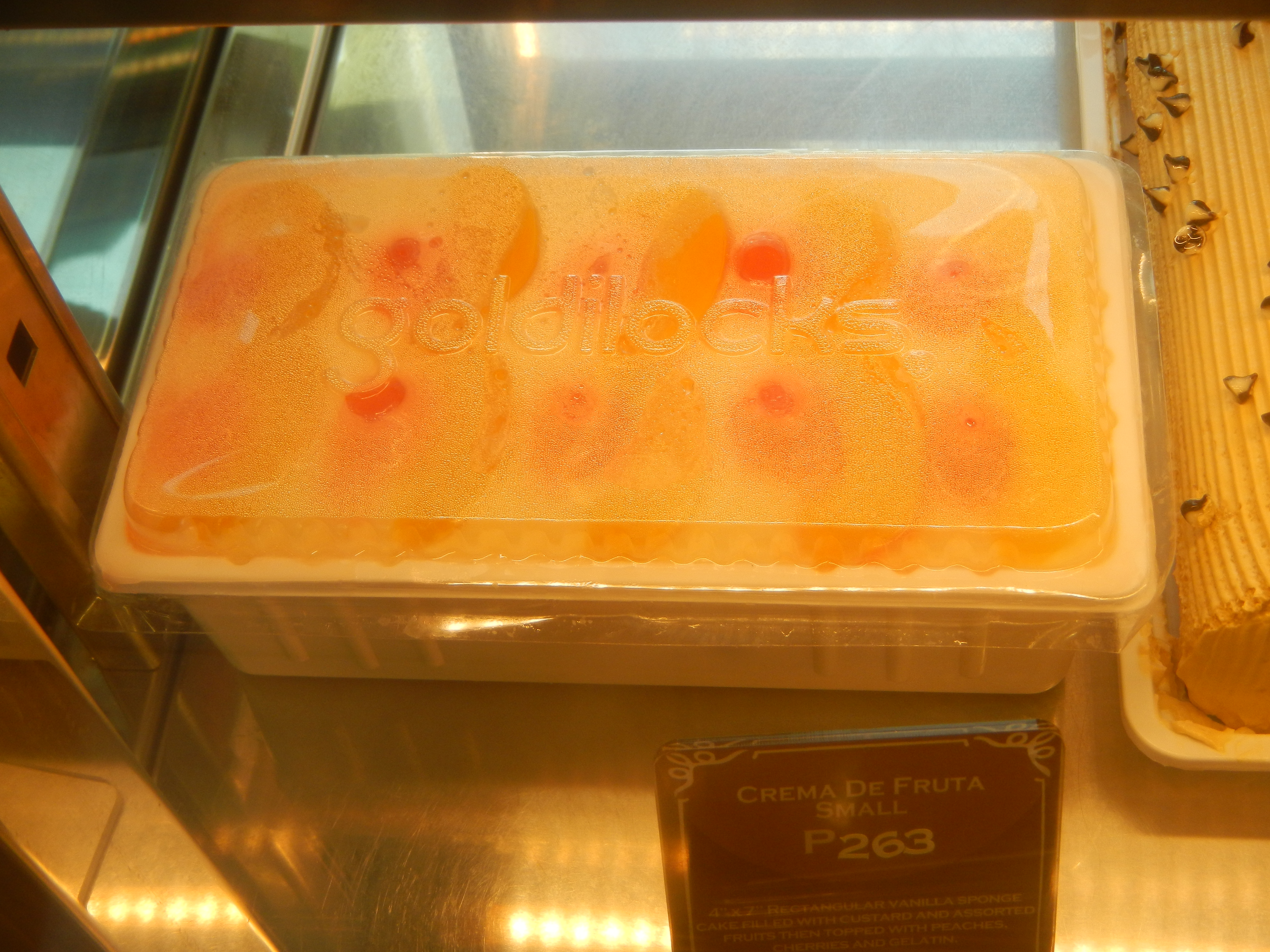
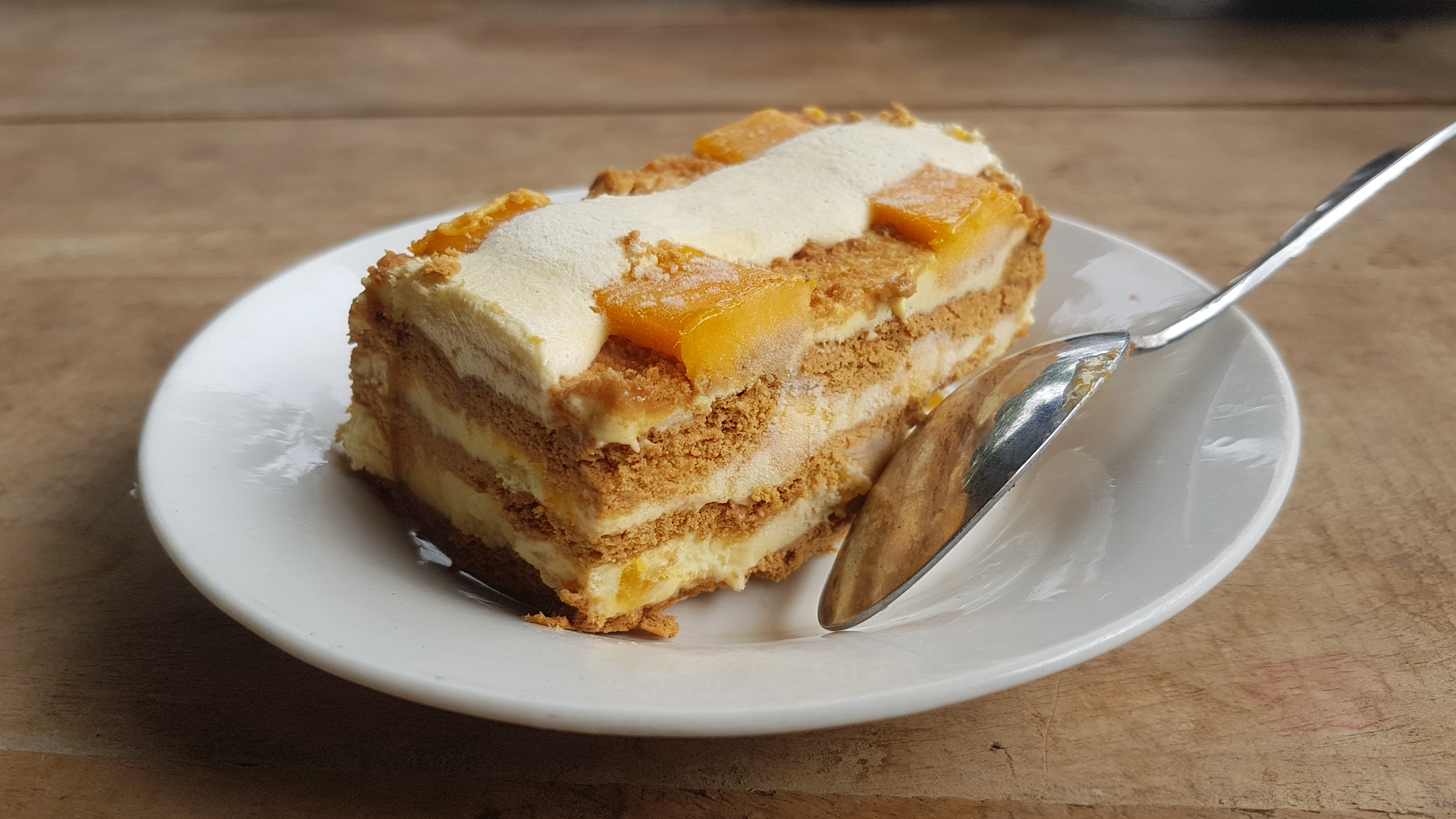
- Top: crema de fruta from Goldilocks Bakeshop; bottom: mango float, an icebox cake version of crema de fruta
- Course: Dessert
- Place of origin: Philippines
- Serving temperature: Cold
- Main ingredients: Sponge cake, custard or cream, gelatin or gulaman, various fruits
- Variations: Mango float

Crema de fruta (lit. 'fruit cream') is a traditional Filipino fruitcake made with layers of sponge cake, sweet custard or whipped cream, gelatin or gulaman (agar), and various preserved or fresh fruits, including mangoes, pineapples, cherries, and strawberries. It is usually served during the Christmas season. It has multiple variations, ranging from changes in the fruits used to the addition of ingredients like jam, sago, condensed milk, and others.

An icebox cake variant of crema de fruta also exists, which is much easier to prepare. It is traditionally made with ladyfingers (broas) instead of sponge cake, with layers of custard and fruits. A modern variant of this is the crema de mangga or "mango float", which uses graham crackers, whipped cream, and ripe Carabao mangoes.

== See also ==
- Ube cheesecake
- Mango cake
- Ube cake
- Cassata
- Charlotte (cake)
- Halo-halo
- Mamón
- Sans rival
- Tiramisu
- Trifle
