= Panutsang mani =

Filipino confection

Panocha mani
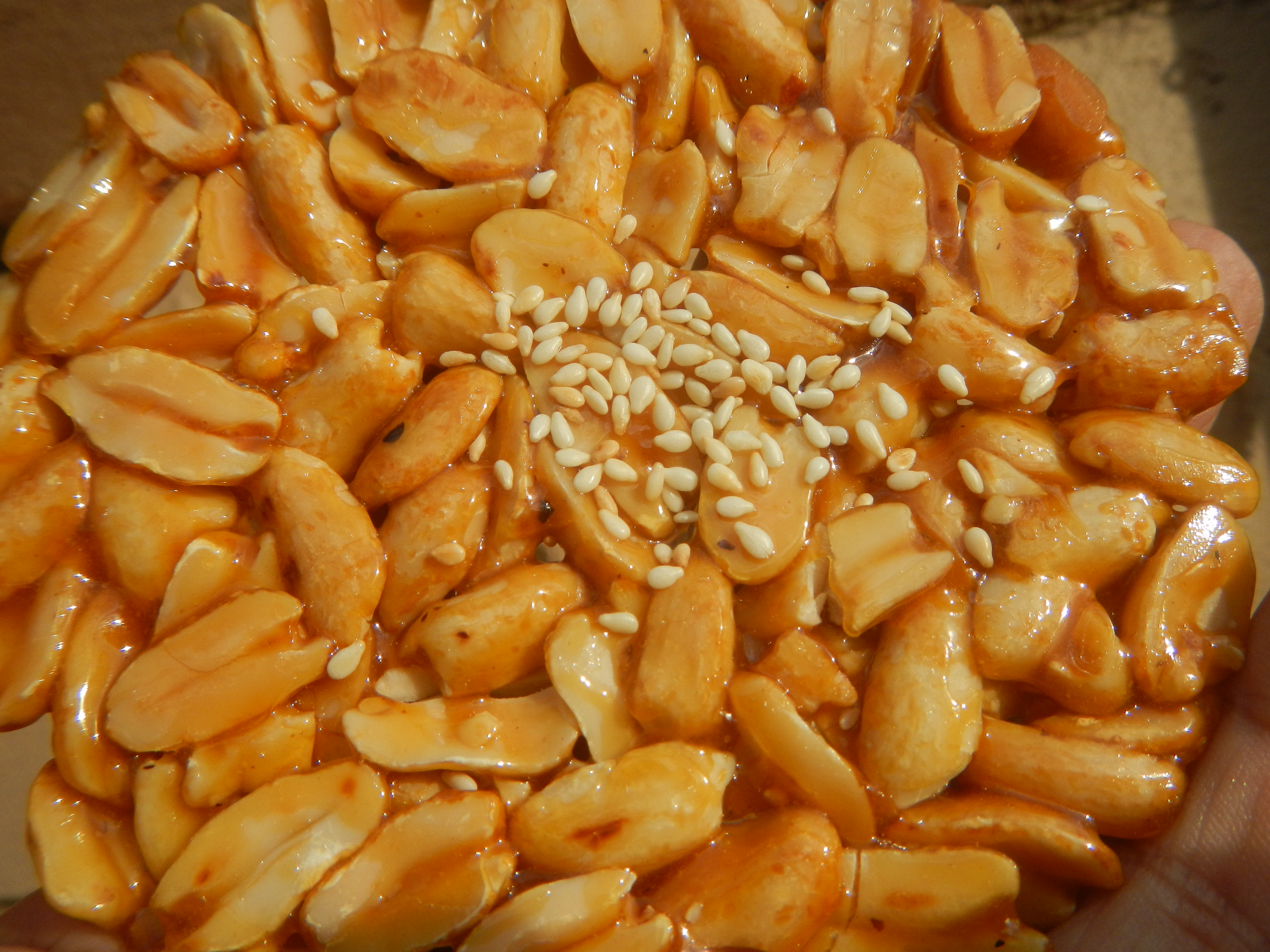
- Alternative names: panutsa mani, panotsa mani, panucha mani, panutsa, samani, piñato, pinyato, piniato
- Type: Confectionery
- Main ingredients: muscovado sugar or sangkaka, peanuts, butter/margarine, baking soda

Bagkat mani, panutsang mani, panutsa, or samani is a Filipino brittle confection made with muscovado sugar or sangkaka (or jaggery), whole peanuts, and butter (or margarine). It can also be made with whole pili nuts. It is similar to bagkat, another Filipino confection made from ground roasted or fried nuts and sugar, but the latter has a chewy texture. It is also sometimes called piñato mani, piñato de Cebu, or simply piñato in the Visayas Islands (not to be confused with piñato de pinipig from Samar, which is a similar snack made with crispy pinipig rice and peanuts).

== See also ==
- Pinasugbo - A Filipino dessert made from deep-fried bananas that are coated with caramelized sugar and sesame seeds
- Caycay - A Filipino cookie coated in syrup and rolled in peanuts
- Panocha - An American pudding made from ground sprouted wheat and unrefined cane sugar
