= Sans rival =

Filipino layer cake

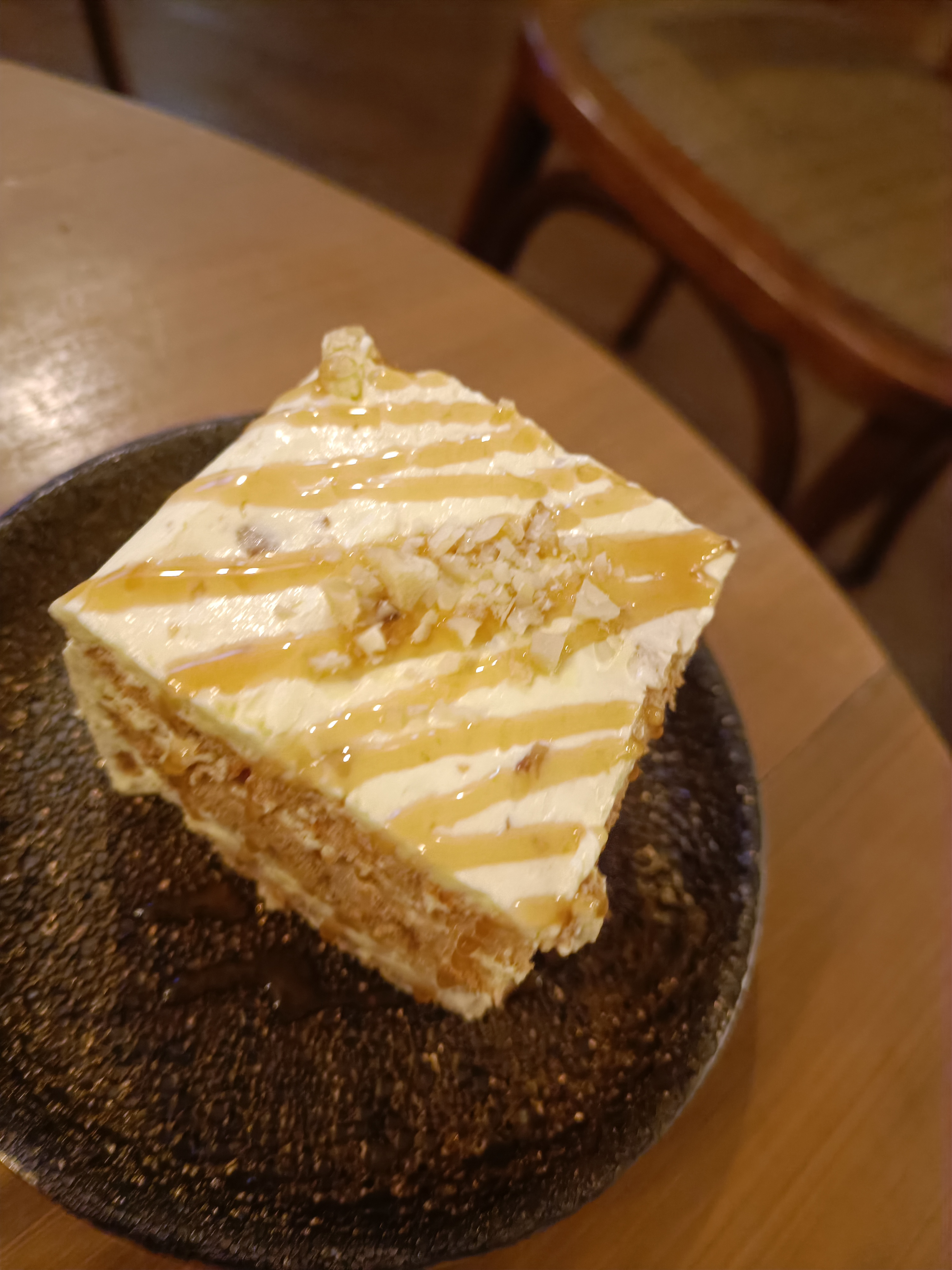
- Sans rival made with pili nut
- Course: Dessert
- Place of origin: Philippines
- Region or state: Dumaguete, Negros Oriental
- Main ingredients: Meringue, buttercream, cashews

Sans rival is a Filipino dessert cake made of layers of buttercream, meringue, and chopped cashews. Its name means "without rival" in French. The cake may be decorated, left plain, or garnished with pistachios.

The cake's origins are disputed. One source claims the recipe has its roots in the French dacquoise, while Lucy Torres-Gomez, writing in The Philippine Star, claims that the cake is descended from the tarta imperial rusa, the Spanish adaptation of a Russian cake which was popular with the Romanovs.

A similar, smaller version of this recipe is called a silvana.

This cake is also popular in Goa, India, where it is known as bolo sans rival or bolo sem rival.

== See also ==
- Crema de fruta
- Mango float
- Ube cheesecake
- List of cakes
