= Pinasugbo =

Filipino dessert

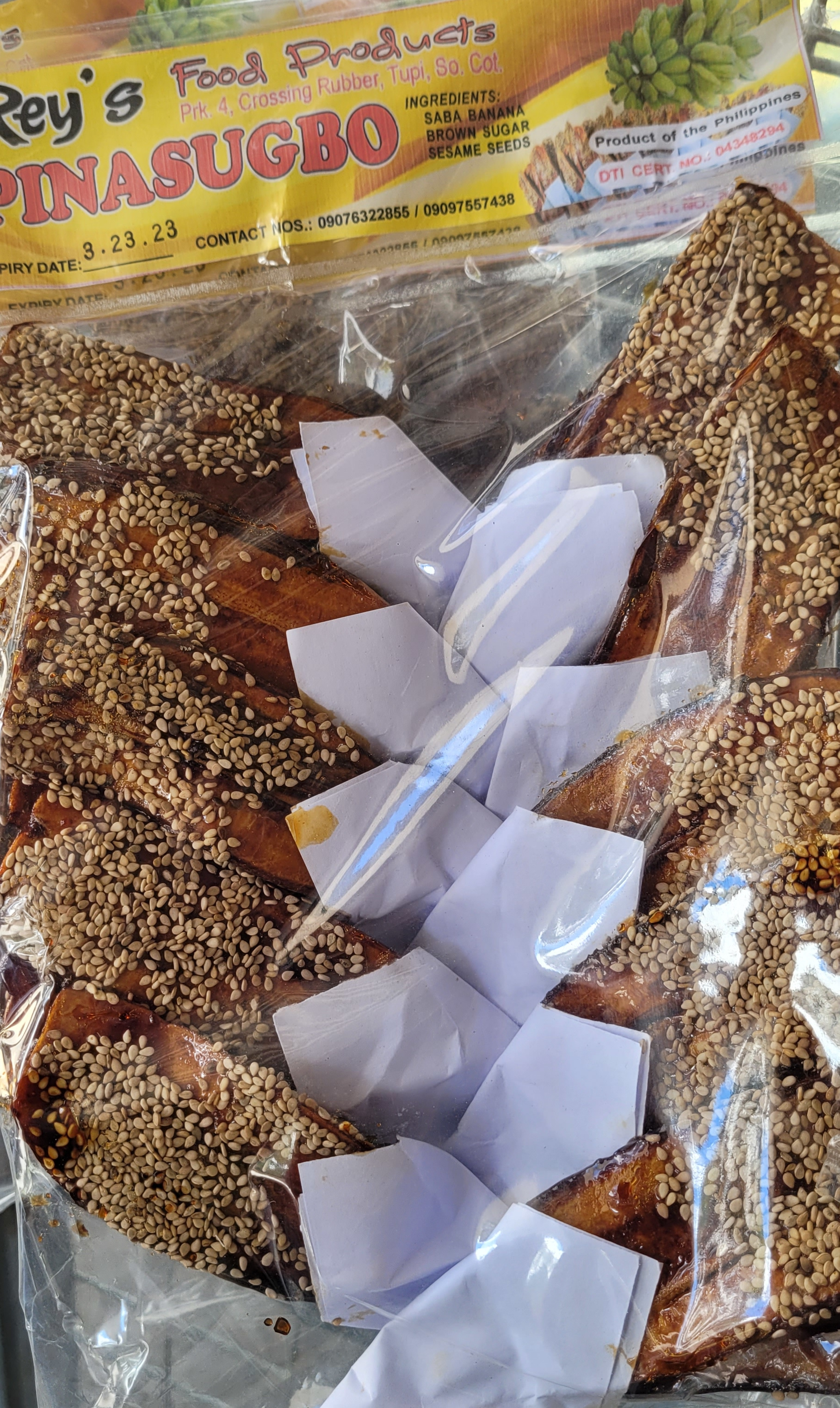
- Alternative names: Consilva
- Place of origin: Philippines
- Region or state: Western Visayas
- Main ingredients: saba banana, brown sugar, sesame seeds

Pinasugbo, also known as consilva, is a Filipino banana chip dessert made from thinly sliced saba bananas that are deep-fried and coated with caramelized sugar and sesame seeds. It originates from the Hiligaynon people of the Western Visayas islands. It is traditionally sold in white paper cones.

== See also ==
- Panocha mani
- Banana cue
- Camote cue
- Maruya
- Turon
