= Ginanggang =

Filipino banana snack food

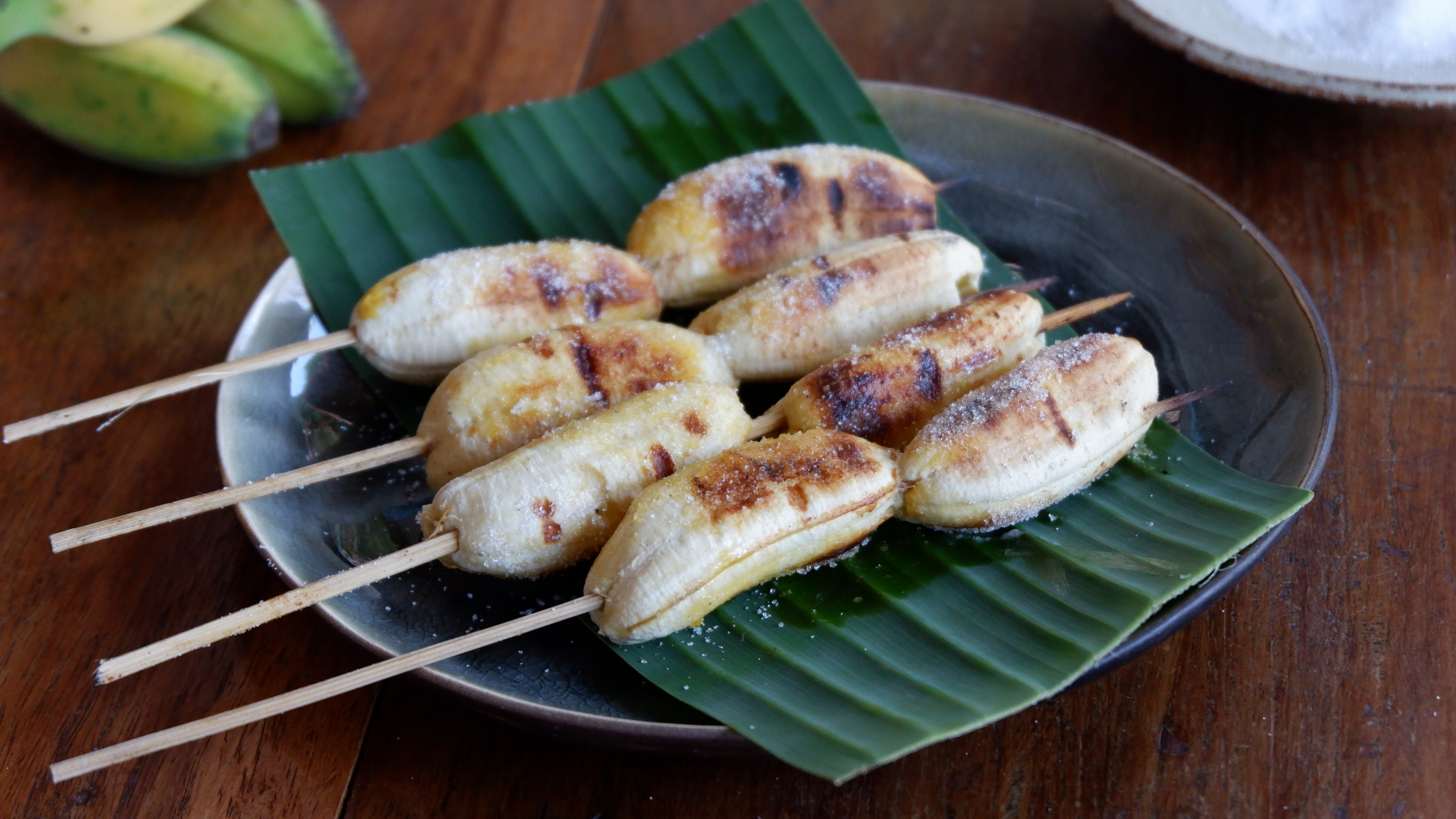
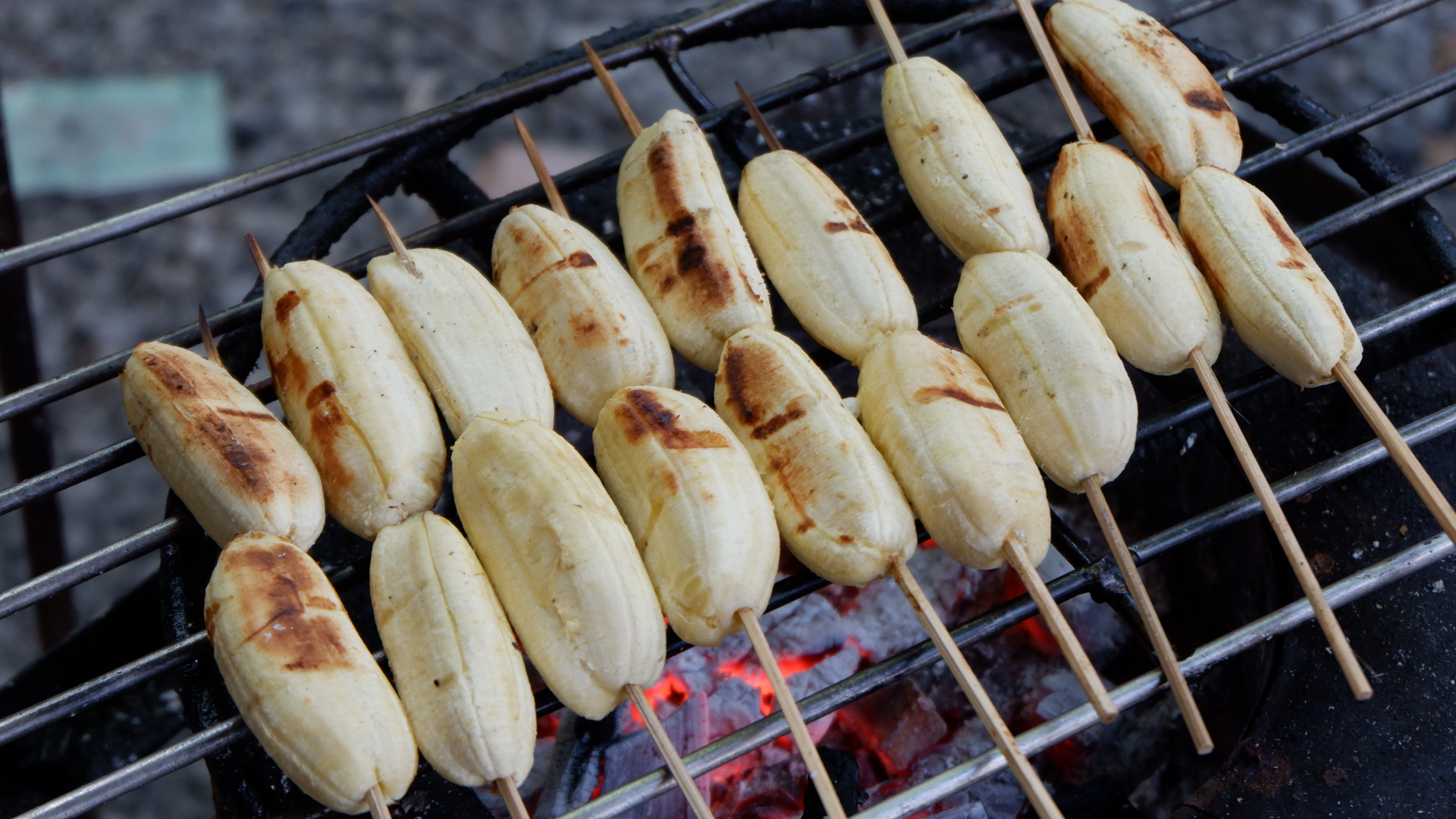
- Alternative names: Guinanggang, ginang-gang, saging ginanggang, ginaggang na saging
- Place of origin: Philippines
- Region or state: Mindanao
- Main ingredients: Bananas, butter or margarine, white sugar

Ginanggang, guinanggang, or ginang-gang (Cebuano pronunciation: [ginaŋ'gaŋ]) is a snack food of grilled skewered bananas brushed with margarine and sprinkled with sugar. It originates from the island of Mindanao in the Philippines. It literally means "grilled" in Cebuano.

Ginanggang is made from a type of banana in the Philippines called saba (a cooking banana also known as the Cardaba banana). The banana is peeled, skewered and then grilled over charcoals. When the outer surface is lightly charred, it is then taken off the grill, brushed with margarine, and sprinkled with sugar. It differs from banana cue in that riper saba bananas are preferred; the banana is actually grilled on the stick instead of being fried and skewered later, and the sugar used is white table sugar and is not caramelized (being applied after cooking).

A "Ginanggang Festival" is celebrated in honor of San Isidro Labrador every 2nd Sunday of May in Baranggay Poblacion, Tubod, Lanao del Norte.

== See also ==
- Banana cue
- Camote cue
- Turon
- Maruya
