= Graham cracker =

Confectionery

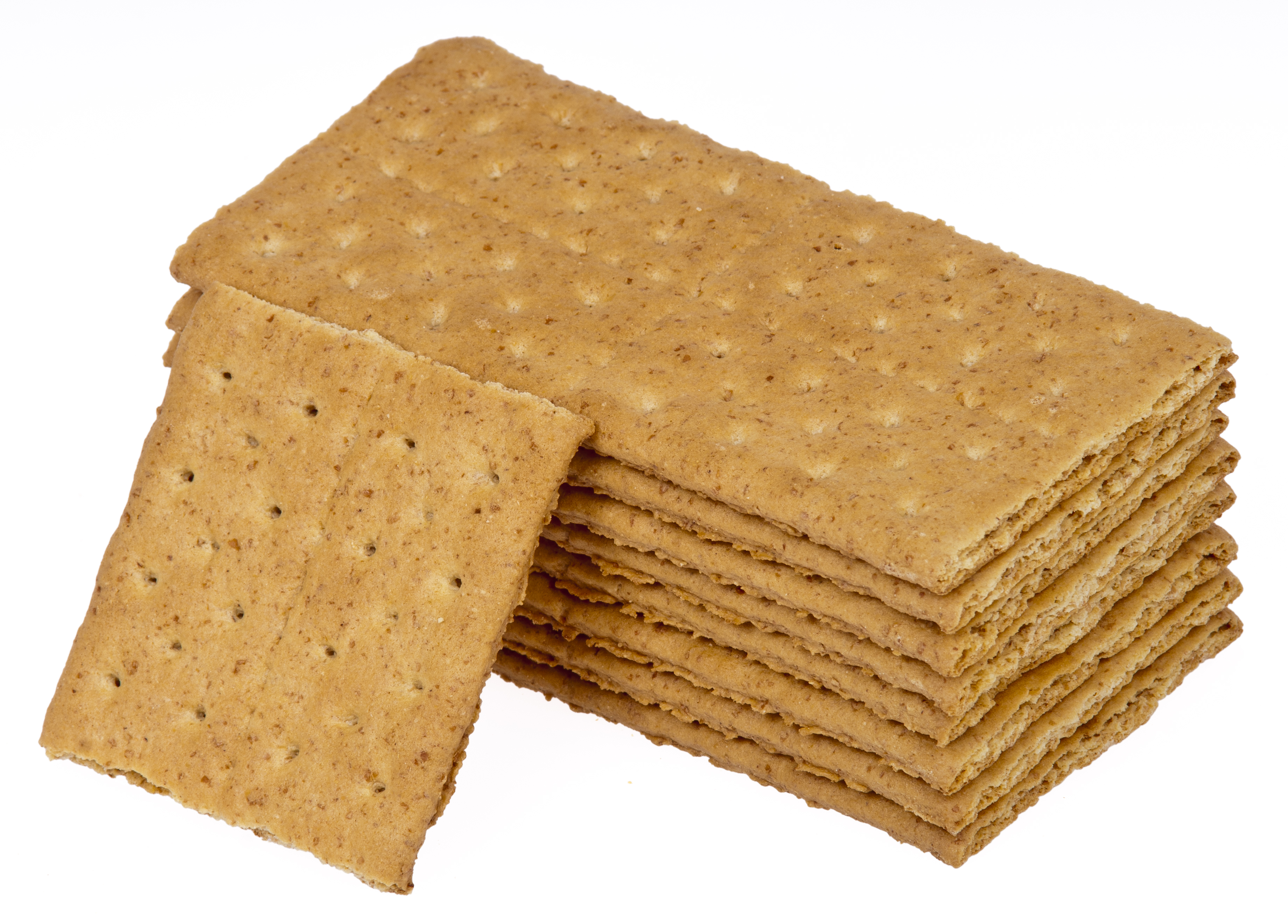
- Modern mass-produced graham crackers
- Alternative names: Graham wafer
- Type: Cracker
- Place of origin: United States
- Main ingredients: Graham flour

A graham cracker (pronounced /ˈɡreɪ.əm/ GRAY-əm or /ˈɡræm/ GRAM in the US) is a sweet cracker made with graham flour that originated in the United States in the mid-19th century, with commercial development from about 1880, and mass production beginning in 1898 by The National Biscuit Company. It is eaten as a snack food, usually honey- or cinnamon-flavored, and is used as an ingredient in some foods, e.g., in the graham cracker crust for cheesecakes and pies.

== History ==
The graham cracker was inspired by the preaching of Sylvester Graham, who was part of the 19th-century temperance movement. He believed that a vegetarian diet anchored by bread made from wheat coarsely ground at home was how God intended people to live, and that following this natural law would keep people healthy. Towards that end, Graham introduced the world's first graham wafer product. It was a dull, unsifted flour biscuit baked by Graham himself.

The sugarless wafers were a key component of the eponymous diet. His preaching was taken up widely in the midst of the 1826–1837 cholera pandemic. His followers were called Grahamites and formed one of the first vegetarian movements in America; graham flour, graham crackers, and graham bread were created for them. Graham neither invented nor profited from these products. Herman Melville has an early reference to the crackers in Book XXII, Chapter I, of his 1852 novel Pierre; or The Ambiguities:

For all the long wards, corridors, and multitudinous chambers of the Apostles' were scattered with the stems of apples, the stones of prunes, and the shells of peanuts. They went about huskily muttering the Kantian Categories through teeth and lips dry and dusty as any miller's, with crumbs of Graham crackers.

== Production ==
The main ingredients in its earlier preparations were graham flour, oil, shortening or lard, molasses and salt. Graham crackers have been a mass-produced food product in the United States since 1898, with the National Biscuit Company being the first to mass-produce it at that time. The Loose-Wiles Biscuit Company also began mass-producing the product beginning sometime in the early 1910s. The product continues to be mass-produced in the U.S. and Canada today.

In earlier times, mass-produced graham crackers were typically prepared using yeast-leavened dough, which added flavor to the food via the process of fermentation, whereas contemporary mass production of the product typically omits this process. The dough is sometimes chilled before being rolled out, which prevents blistering and breakage from occurring when the product is baked.

== Uses ==
Graham cracker crumbs are used to create graham cracker crusts for fruit pies and moon pies, and as a base, layer or topping for cheesecake. Graham cracker pie crusts are mass-produced in the United States, and consumer versions of the product typically consist of a graham cracker crumb mixture pressed into an aluminum pie pan. The graham cracker is a main ingredient in the preparation of the s'more. Graham crackers are commonly used in place of broas in the traditional Filipino icebox cake mango float.

== Gallery ==
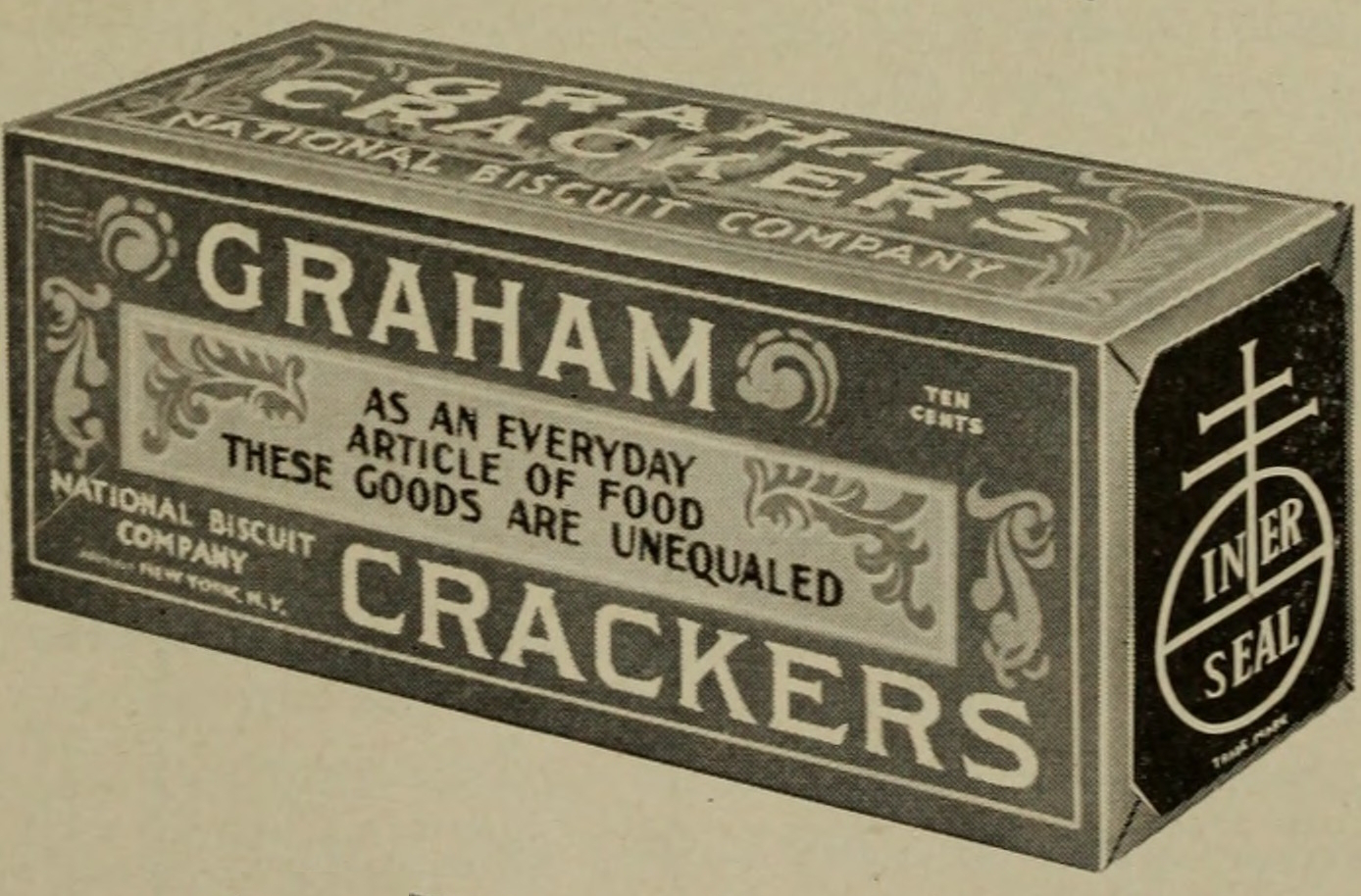
A box of National Biscuit Company graham crackers, c. 1915, which was priced at ten cents (around $3.00 in 2026)

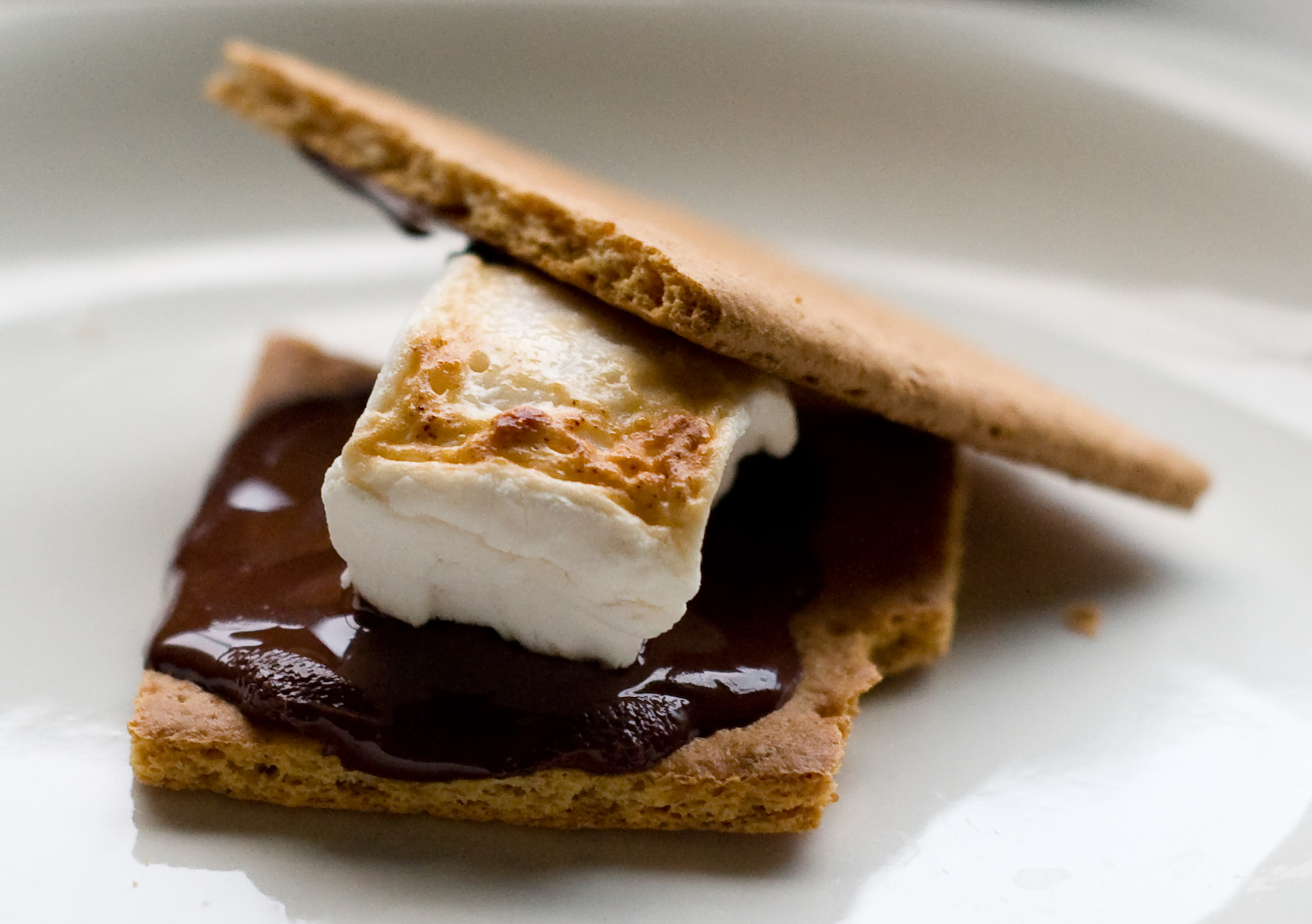
A s'more

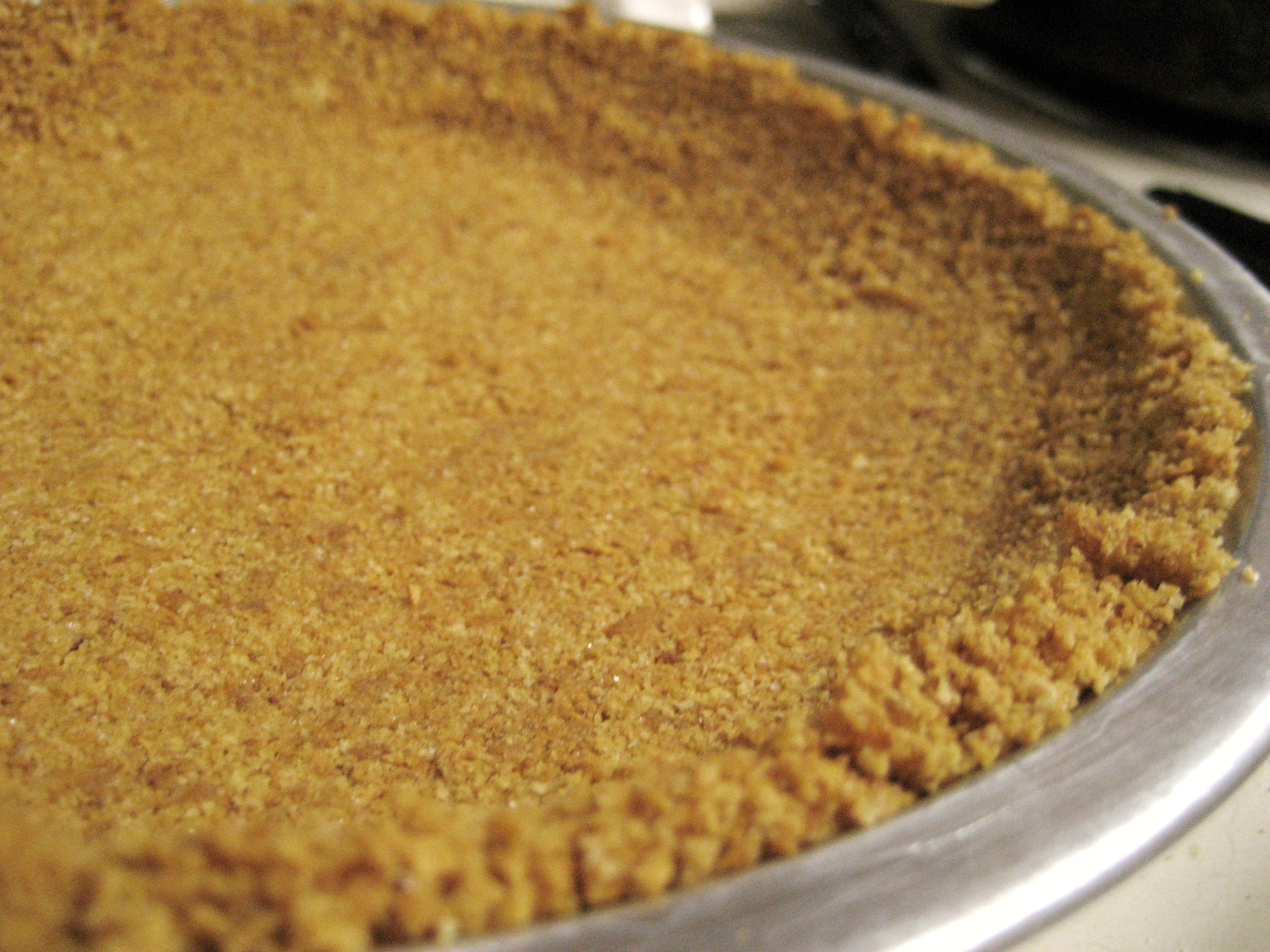
A homemade graham cracker crust

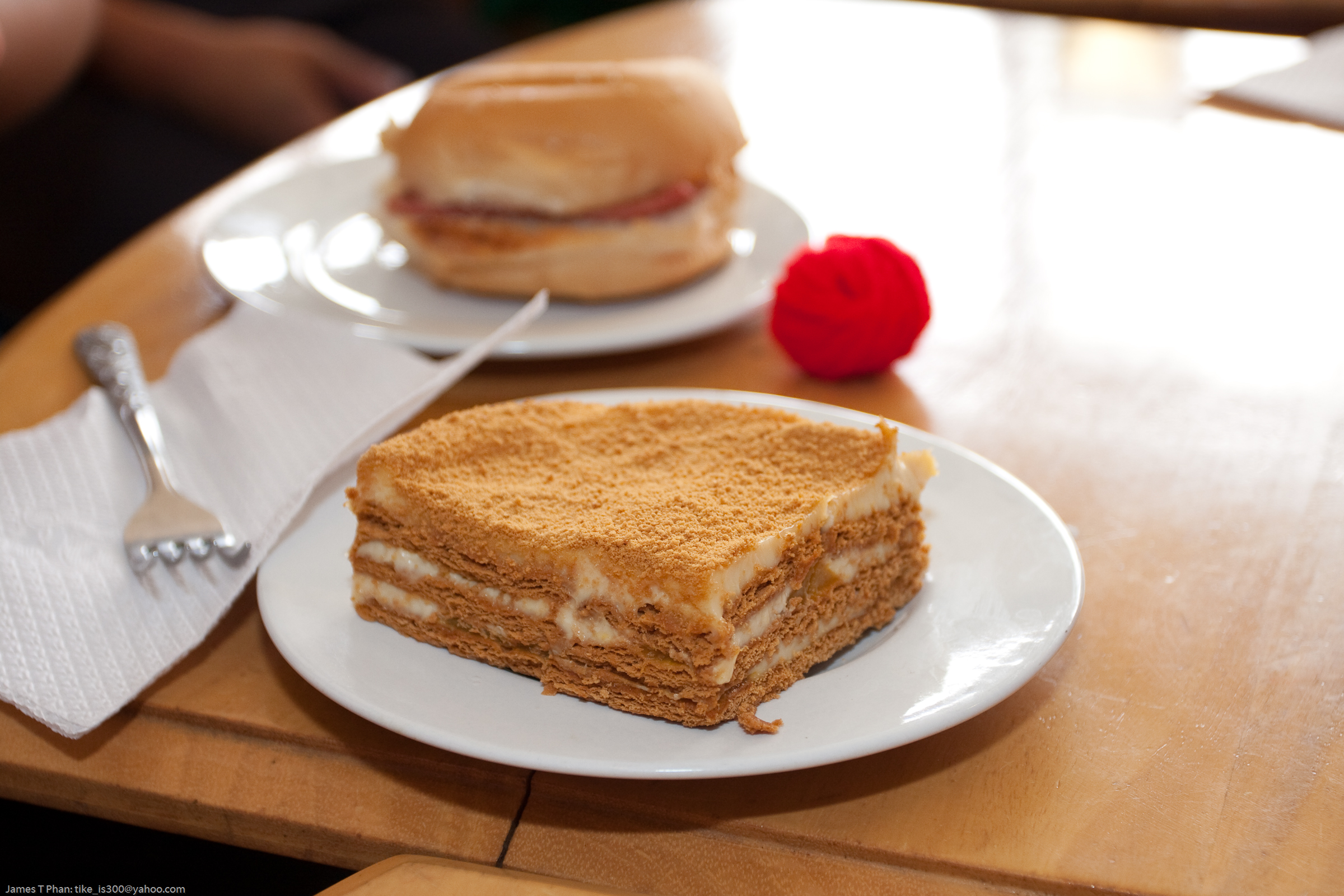
A Mango float, an icebox cake dessert from the Philippines using graham crackers, cream, and ripe Philippine mango

== See also ==
- Digestive biscuit
- Bland diet
- Icebox cake
- Mango float
- List of crackers
