= Mango float =

Filipino dessert

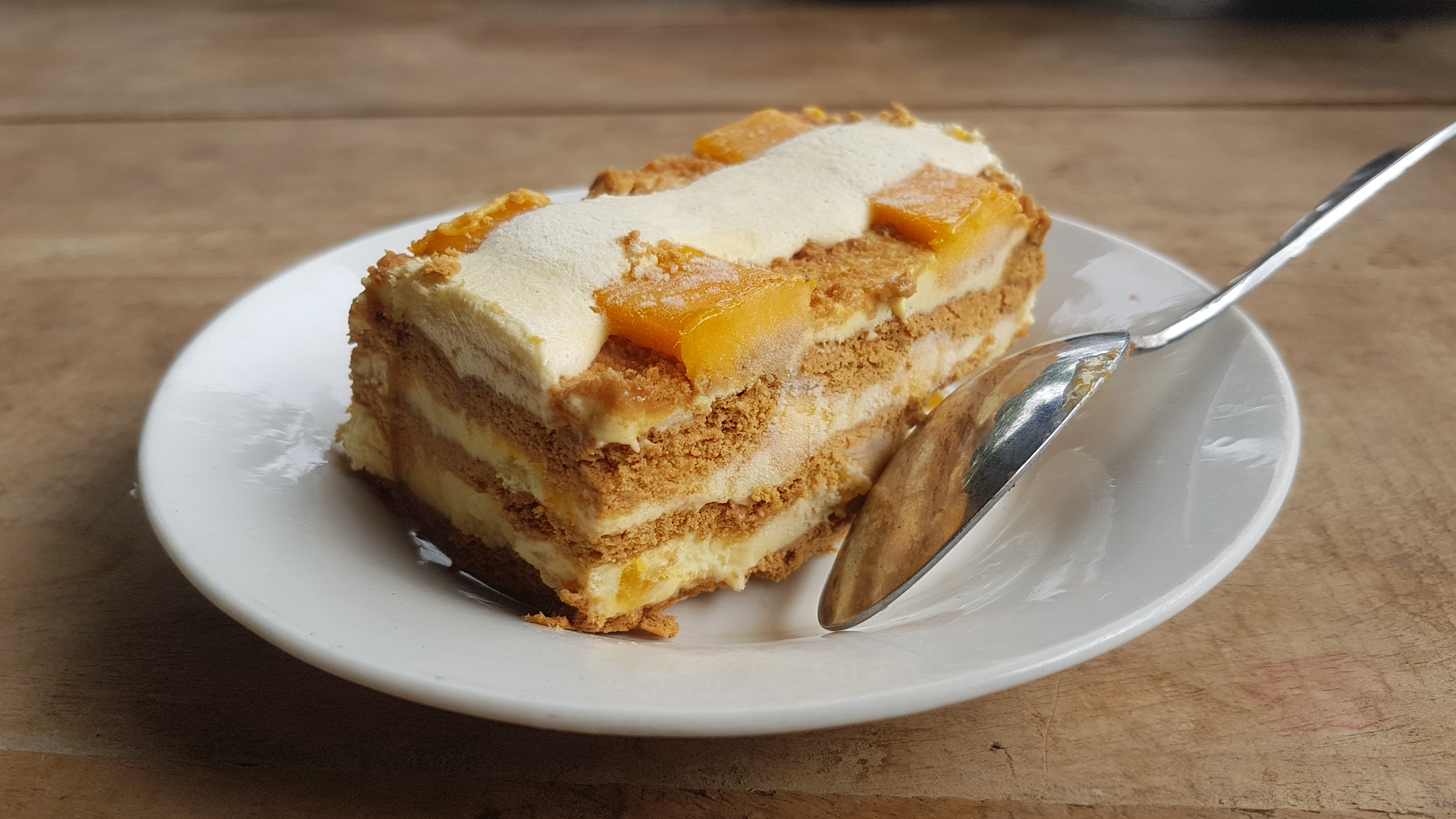
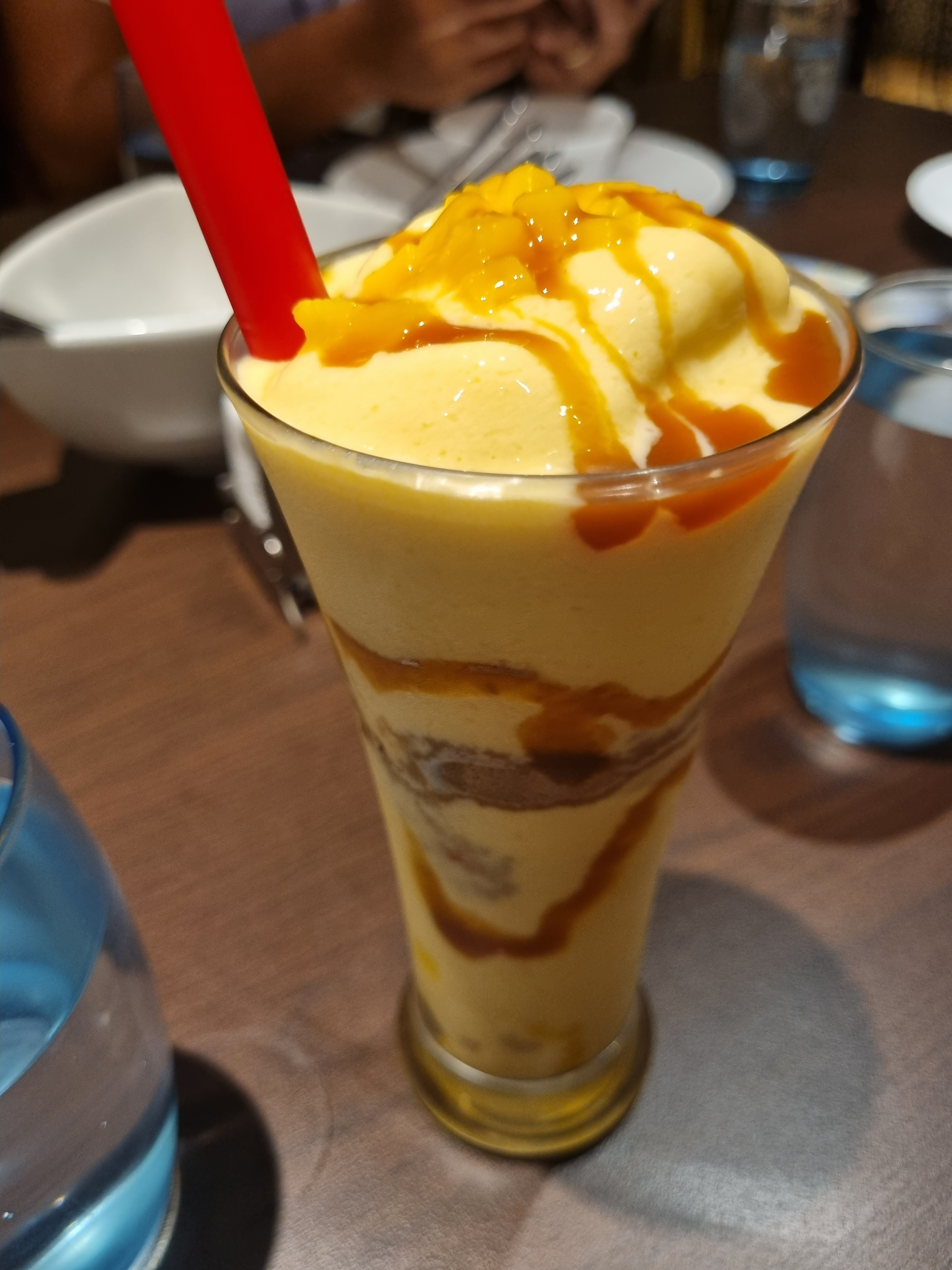
- Top: A slice of mango float Bottom: Mango float shake, a milkshake version of mango float
- Alternative names: Crema de mangga, mango royale, mango icebox cake, mango graham cake, mango graham float, mango refrigerator cake
- Course: Dessert
- Place of origin: The Philippines
- Serving temperature: Cold
- Main ingredients: Ladyfingers/graham crackers, whipped cream, condensed milk, ripe carabao mangoes
- Variations: Crema de fruta

Mango float or crema de mangga is a Filipino icebox cake dessert made with layers of graham cracker crust, whipped cream, condensed milk, and ripe carabao mangoes. It is chilled for a few hours before serving, though it can also be frozen to give it an ice cream-like consistency. It is a modern variant of the traditional Filipino crema de fruta cake. It is also known by other names like mango refrigerator cake, mango graham float, mango royale, and mango icebox cake, among others. Crema de mangga is another version that additionally uses custard and gulaman (agar) or gelatin, as in the original crema de fruta.

Mango float may also be made with various other fruits and ingredients including strawberries, pineapple, bananas, and cherries, among others. Regional variations can even use ube, young coconut, cacao beans, avocado, and durian. Combinations of different fruits result in a version closer to the original crema de fruta, like in the "fruit cocktail" graham float.

A milkshake version of the recipe made with milk, whipped cream, graham cracker crumbs, and puréed mangoes is also popular.

== See also ==
- Buko pie
- Cassata
- Halo-halo
- Sans rival
- Silvana
- Trifle
- Ube cake
