= Pan de regla =

Philippine bread with a red bread pudding filling

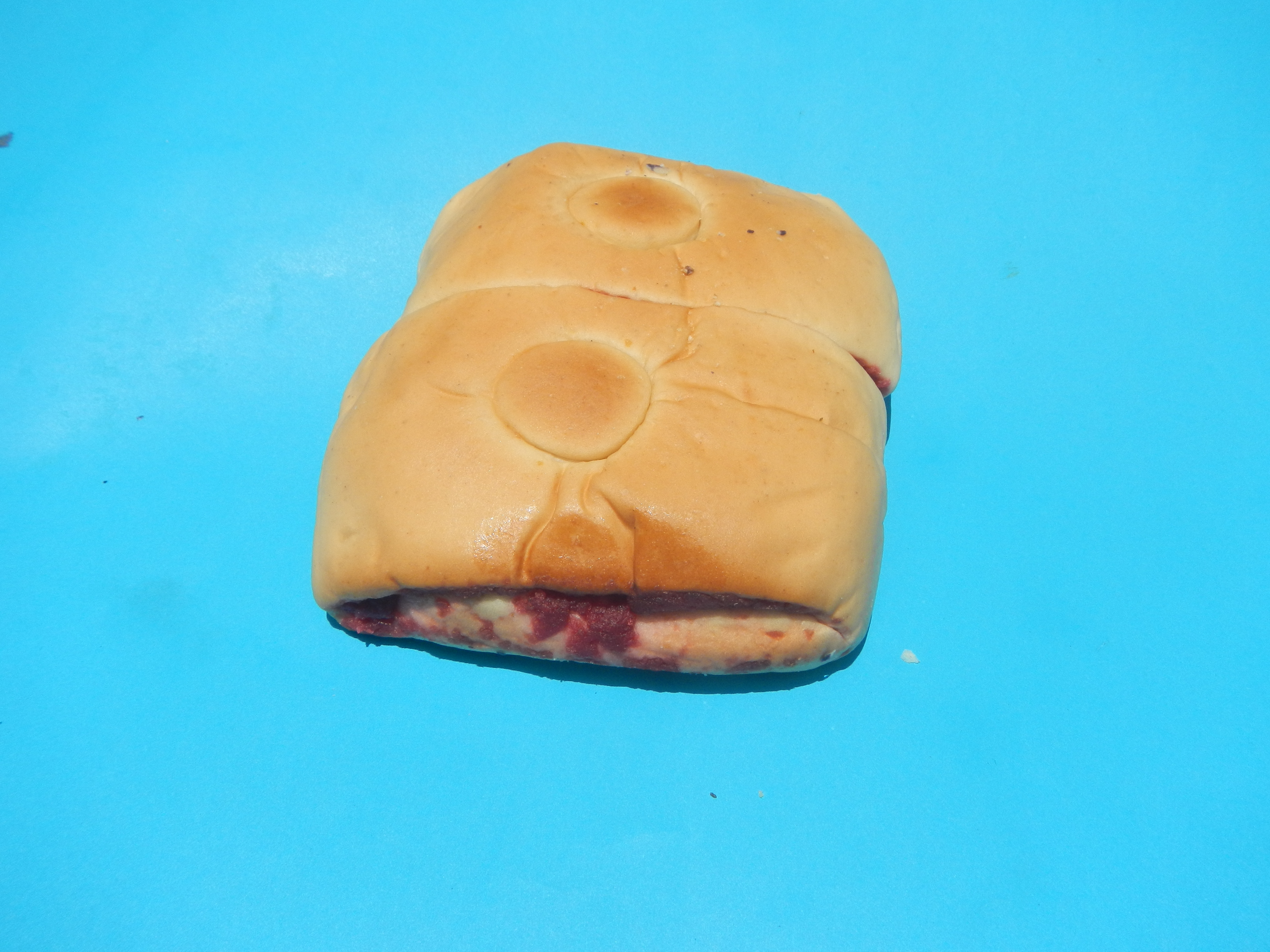
- Alternative names: Kalihim, pan de pula, bellas, kabukiran, ligaya, balintawak, alembong, lipstick bread
- Type: Bread roll
- Place of origin: Philippines
- Main ingredients: flour, sugar, milk, butter, salt, stale bread, sugar, vanilla

Pan de regla, also known as kalihim, is a Filipino bread with a characteristically bright red, magenta, or pink bread pudding filling made from the torn pieces of stale bread mixed with milk, sugar, eggs, butter, and vanilla. It is known by a wide variety of local names, most of which are humorous. It is a common cheap bread sold in bakeries in the Philippines. It is usually eaten for merienda.

== Names ==
Most of the names of the bread are deliberately humorous and vulgar. Its most common name, pan de regla, translates to "menstrual bread" due to its color and appearance. This is also referenced in other local names like alembong ("flirty"), bellas ("beautiful [women]"), ligaya ("happiness"), and pan de burikat ("prostitute's bread"). Its second most common name, kalihim ("secret"), is because the secret of the bread is that its filling is actually made from the previous day's unsold bread. This is also the source of the name "everlasting bread". Other more descriptive names include pan de pula ("red bread"), lipstick bread, floor wax bread, or kabukiran ("farm [bread]").

== Description ==
The defining characteristic of pan de regla is its filling, which is actually a bread pudding. It is made from torn pieces of stale bread mixed with milk, eggs, sugar, vanilla extract, and a bright red, magenta, or pink food dye. The mixture is refrigerated for a few hours so that the bread absorbs the liquid. It is then cooked slowly in a pan while continually stirring until it achieves a chunky paste-like consistency. It is allowed to cool before being spread onto a thin sheet of dough which is then folded into a flattened cylinder. The cylinder is cut into sections and baked.

Some variants of pan de regla do not use stale bread, but instead use flour to make the filling. The red dye can also be left out, resulting in the natural brown color.

The process to make pan de regla can be easily adapted to make other types of breads with different fillings, including pan de coco and pan de monggo. It is also commonly adapted to make breads with fillings like ube, buko pandan, or pineapple. In these cases, the fillings are dyed different colors or are not dyed at all.

== See also ==
- Monay bread
- Biscocho
- Pan de sal
- Pan de coco
- Spanish bread
