= Monggo bread =

Philippine bread with a mung bean filling

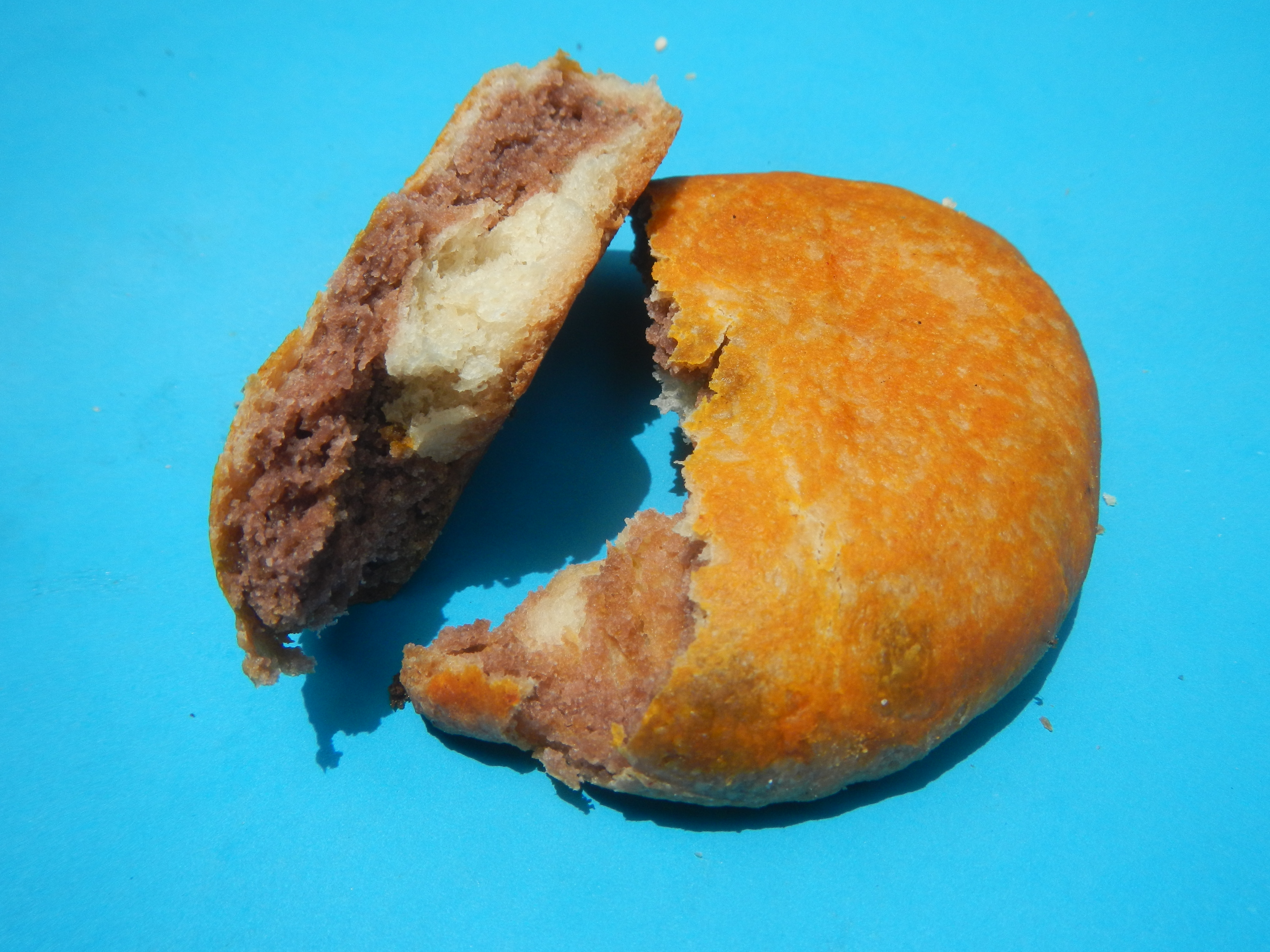
- Alternative names: Pan de Monggo, Munggo bread, Pan de Munggo
- Type: bread
- Place of origin: Philippines
- Main ingredients: flour, sugar, milk, butter, salt, eggs, mung bean paste

Monggo bread, known in the Philippines as pan de monggo, is a Filipino bread with a distinctive filling made from mung bean or adzuki bean paste.

The bread used can come in a wide variety of shapes and recipes, ranging from buns, to ensaymada-like rolls, to loaves. It is one of the most common types of bread filling or flavour in the Philippines.

It is usually eaten for Merienda.

== See also ==
- Hopia
- Pan de regla
- Pan de coco
- Pandesal
- Anpan
