= Pan de siosa =

Filipino food

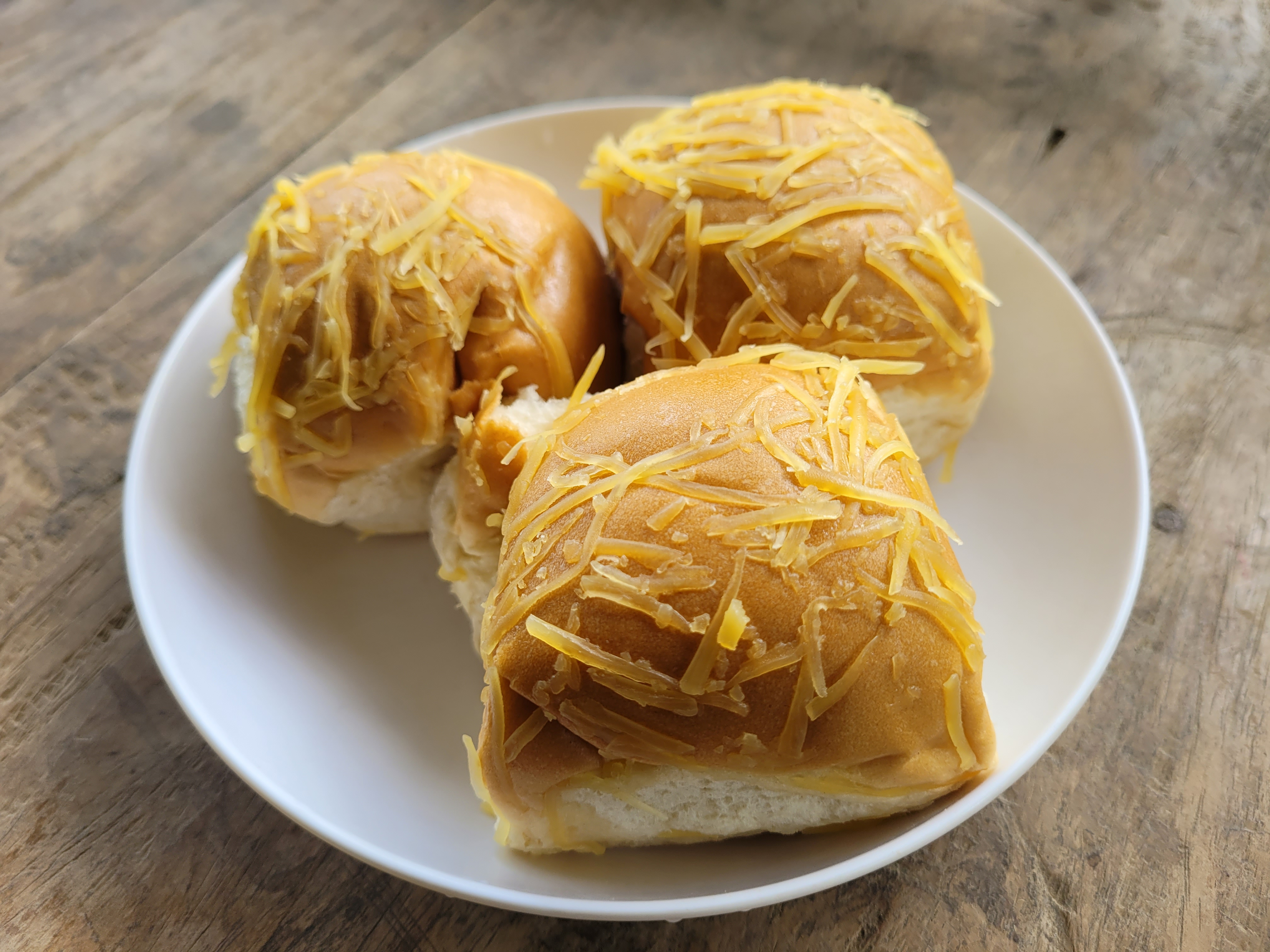
- Alternative names: Pan de leche, Filipino pull-apart bread, Pan de ciosa, Pan de shosa, Pandesiosa, Pandeciosa, Pandesyosa, Pandeshosa
- Type: bread roll
- Place of origin: Philippines
- Region or state: Visayas (particularly Bacolod and Iloilo)
- Main ingredients: flour, sugar, milk, butter, salt

Pan de siosa, also called pan de leche, is a Filipino pull-apart bread originating from the Visayas Islands of the Philippines. They characteristically have a very soft texture and are baked stuck together. It can be eaten plain with savory meat or soup dishes, or as a dessert brushed with a generous amount of butter and sprinkled with sugar and grated cheese (similar to the Filipino ensaymada). In Bacolod, they can also uniquely be toasted on a skewer and brushed with oil, margarine, or banana ketchup, and then paired with inihaw dishes.

== See also ==
- Pastel de Camiguin
- Pan de sal
- Pan de monja
- Pan de coco
