= Pinagong =

Food item

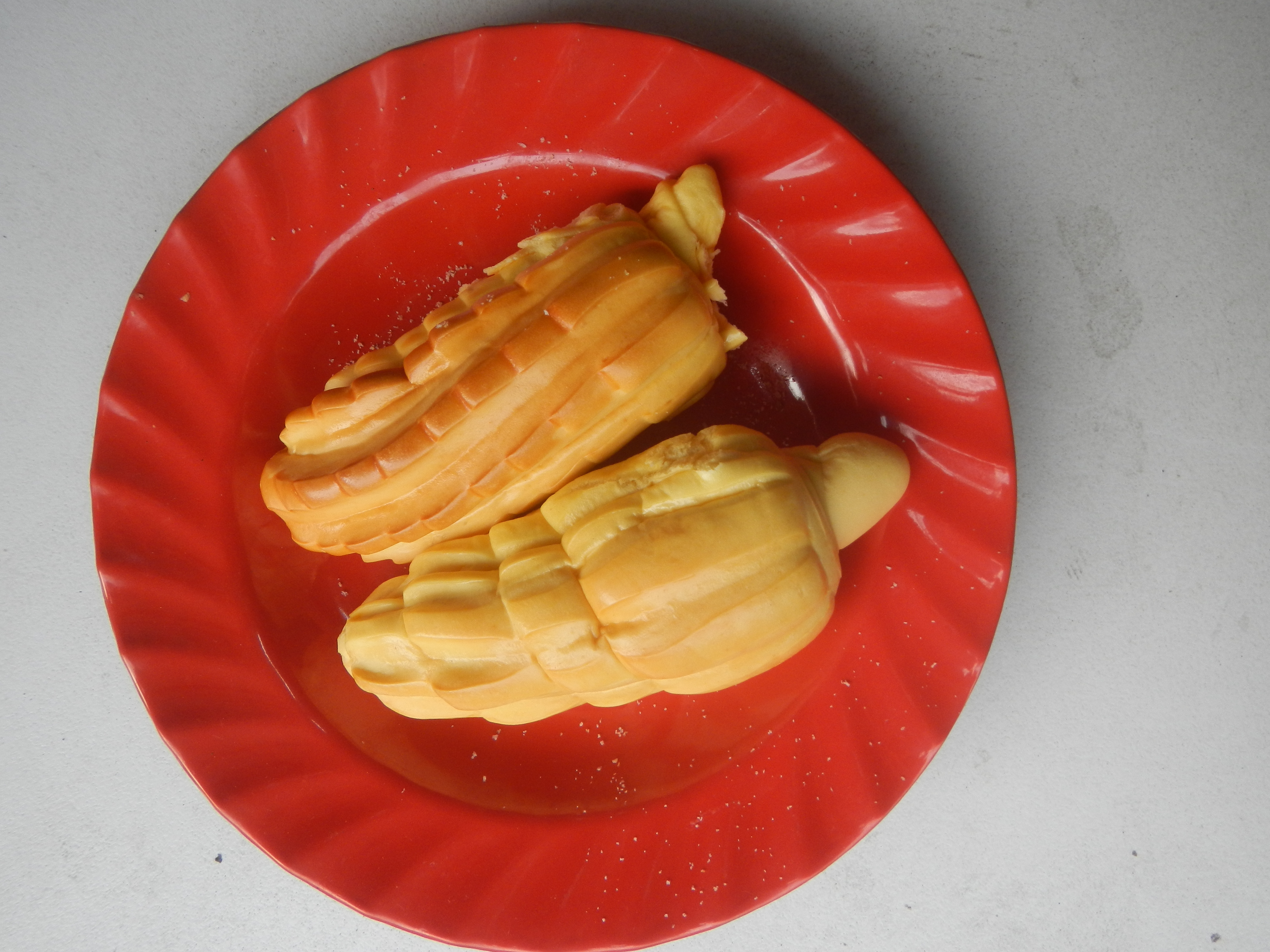
- Alternative names: Filipino turtle bread
- Type: Bread roll
- Place of origin: Philippines
- Region or state: Sariaya, Quezon

Pinagong is a dense bread roll from the Philippines made with all-purpose flour, milk, and salt. It is a variant of pan de monja (monáy) distinguished primarily by its shape and the more complex pattern of scoring on top. The name means "made into a turtle", from Tagalog pagong ("turtle").

== See also ==
- Putok
- Pandesal
- List of bread rolls
