= Spanish bread (Philippines) =

Philippine bread with a sweet buttery filling

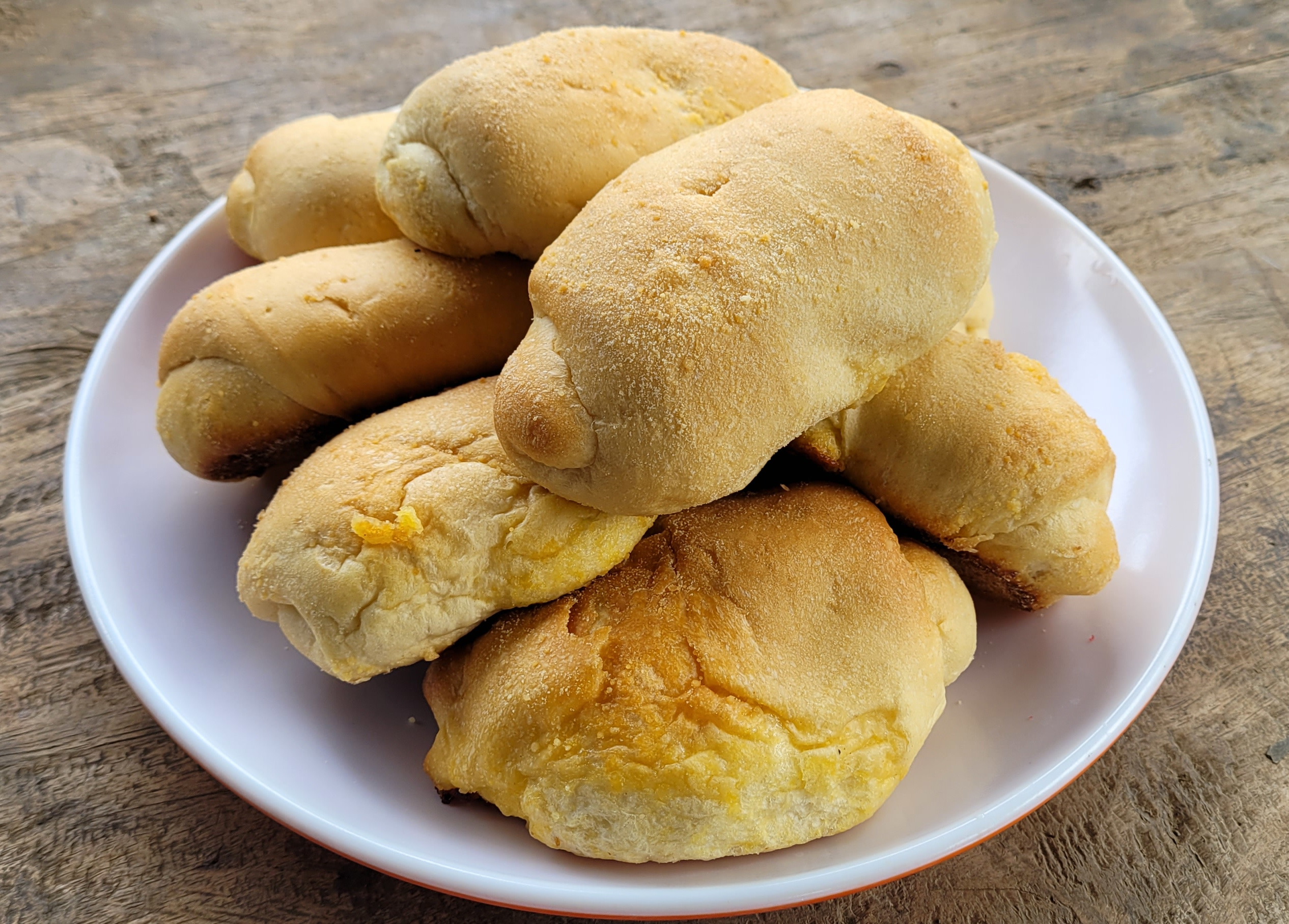
- Alternative names: Señorita bread, senyorita bread, pan de kastila
- Type: bread roll
- Place of origin: Philippines
- Main ingredients: flour, brown sugar, milk, butter or margarine, salt, eggs, breadcrumbs

Spanish bread, also known as señorita bread or pan de kastila, is a Filipino bread roll characteristically oblong or cylindrical in shape with a traditional sweet filling made of breadcrumbs, butter or margarine, and brown sugar. It is usually yellowish in color due to the use of eggs and butter. The exterior is sprinkled with breadcrumbs.

It is one of the most popular types of bread in the Philippines, usually part of the "Filipino bread basket" with the pan de coco and pan de sal, commonly served for breakfast or merienda.

Despite the name, it does not originate from Spain and has no relation to the Spanish pan de horno (also called "Spanish bread").

== Description ==
Spanish bread is made similarly to pandesal except for the addition of eggs and butter. It is also similar to the Filipino ensaymada, except it is rolled in a different way. Its distinctive aspect is the sweet filling, which is traditionally made from butter (or margarine) mixed with breadcrumbs and brown sugar. The filling is evenly spread on the flattened dough (usually triangular in shape, but can also be square). It is then rolled into a cylinder from one corner, resulting in the characteristic horn-like shape. It is sprinkled with breadcrumbs on the outside and then baked.

== See also ==
- Pan de regla
- Pan de sal
- Pan de monja
- Pan de coco
