= Bakpia =

Filipino/Indonesian bean-filled moon cake-like pastry

Hopia / Bakpia
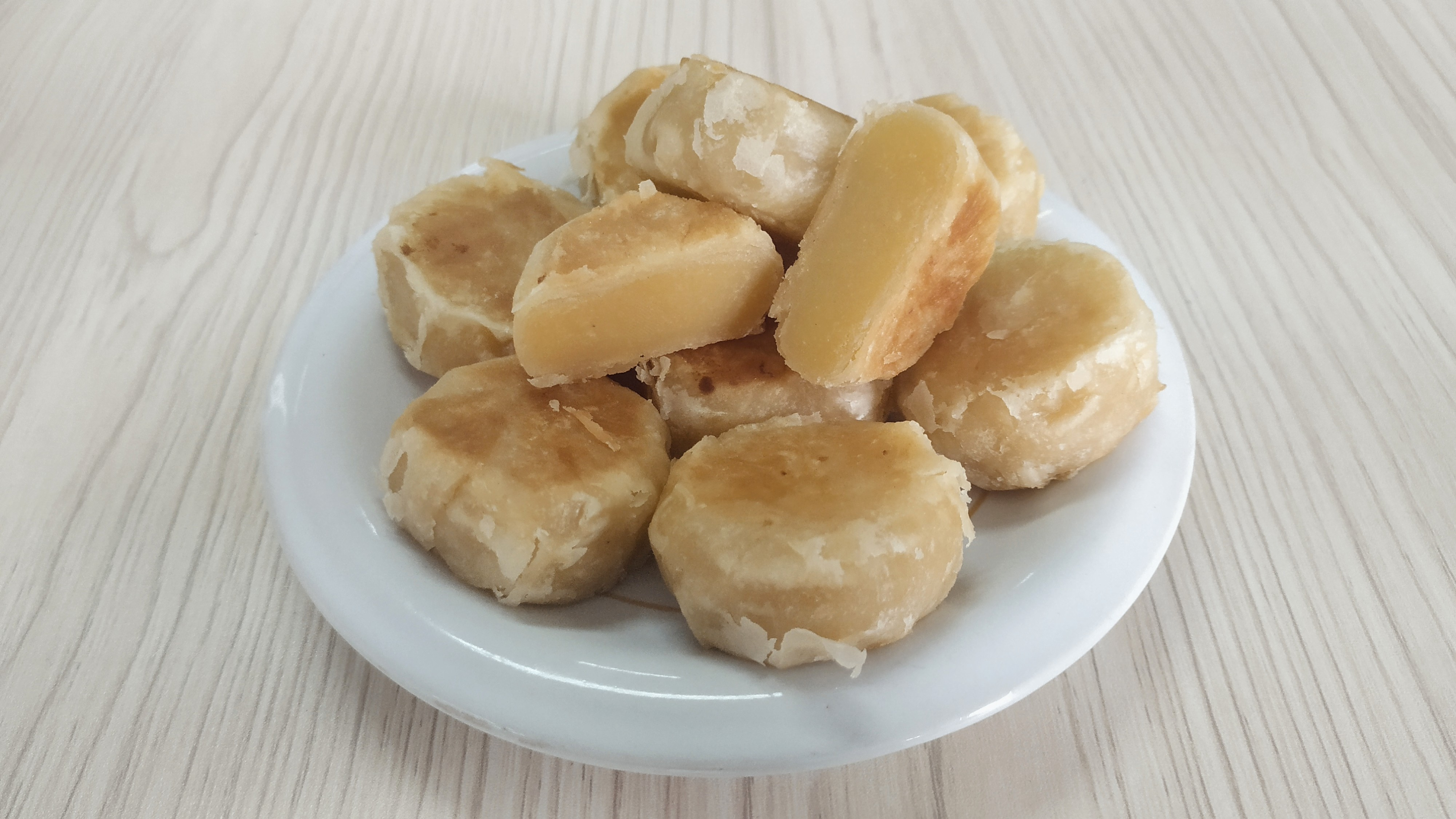
- Alternative names: Hopia, Pia
- Type: Pastry, sweet roll, kue
- Course: Snack, dessert
- Place of origin: Philippines and Indonesia
- Region or state: Southeast Asia
- Variations: Bakpia pathok
- Similar dishes: Heong Peng, banh pia, and other Chinese flaky pastries

Hopia, (Tagalog: [ˈhop.jɐʔ]; Chinese: 好餅; Pe̍h-ōe-jī: hó-piáⁿ; lit. 'good pastry' - the name it is known by in the Philippines) pia or bakpia (Javanese: ꦧꦏ꧀ꦥꦶꦪ, romanized: bakpia; Chinese: 肉餅; Pe̍h-ōe-jī: bah-piáⁿ; lit. 'meat pastry'- the name it is known by in Indonesia) is a popular Indonesian and Philippine bean-filled moon cake-like pastry originally introduced by Fujianese immigrants in the urban centers of both nations around the past centuries. It is a widely available inexpensive treat and a favoured gift for families, friends and relatives.

In Indonesia, it is also widely known as bakpia pathok, named after a suburb of Yogyakarta which specialises in the pastry. These sweet rolls are similar to bigger Indonesian pia, the only difference being the size.

== Types of dough ==
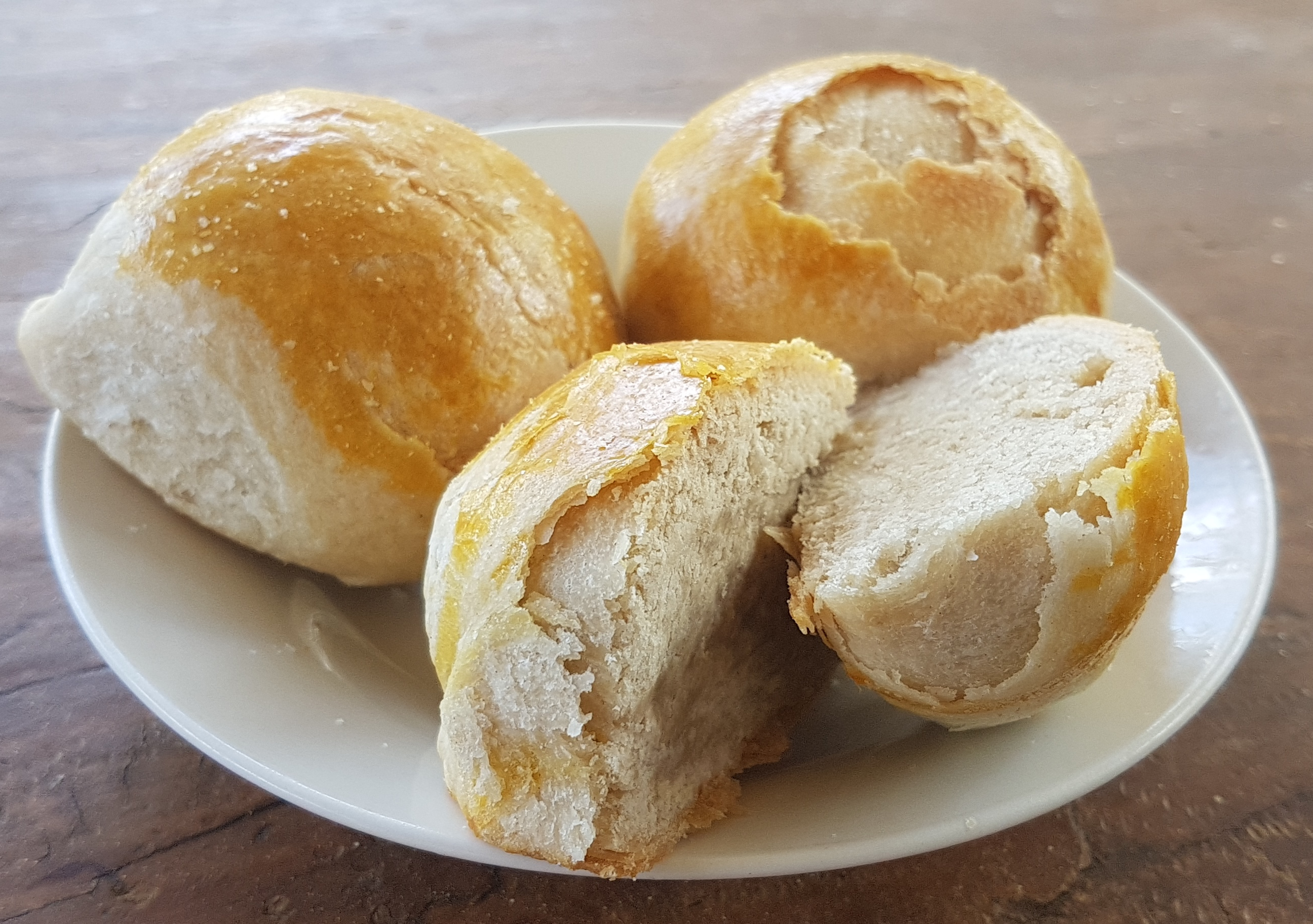
Flaky mung bean hopia from the Philippines

=== Flaky type ===
The flaky type of bakpia uses Chinese puff pastry. Clear examples of this can be seen in China (especially Macau), Taiwan and countries with established Chinese diaspora communities such as Trinidad and Tobago and Guyana making this type the authentic Chinese hopia. In addition, there is more skill involved in making this type of hopia crust.

=== Cake-dough type ===
Filipino hopia utilizes the cake-dough type in addition to the flaky type.

== Fillings ==
Below are the four traditional and most popular bakpia or hopia fillings, though recently other fillings have been created such as cappuccino, cheese, chocolate, custard, durian, mango, pineapple, screwpine (pandan), and umbi talas (taro).

=== Mung bean ===
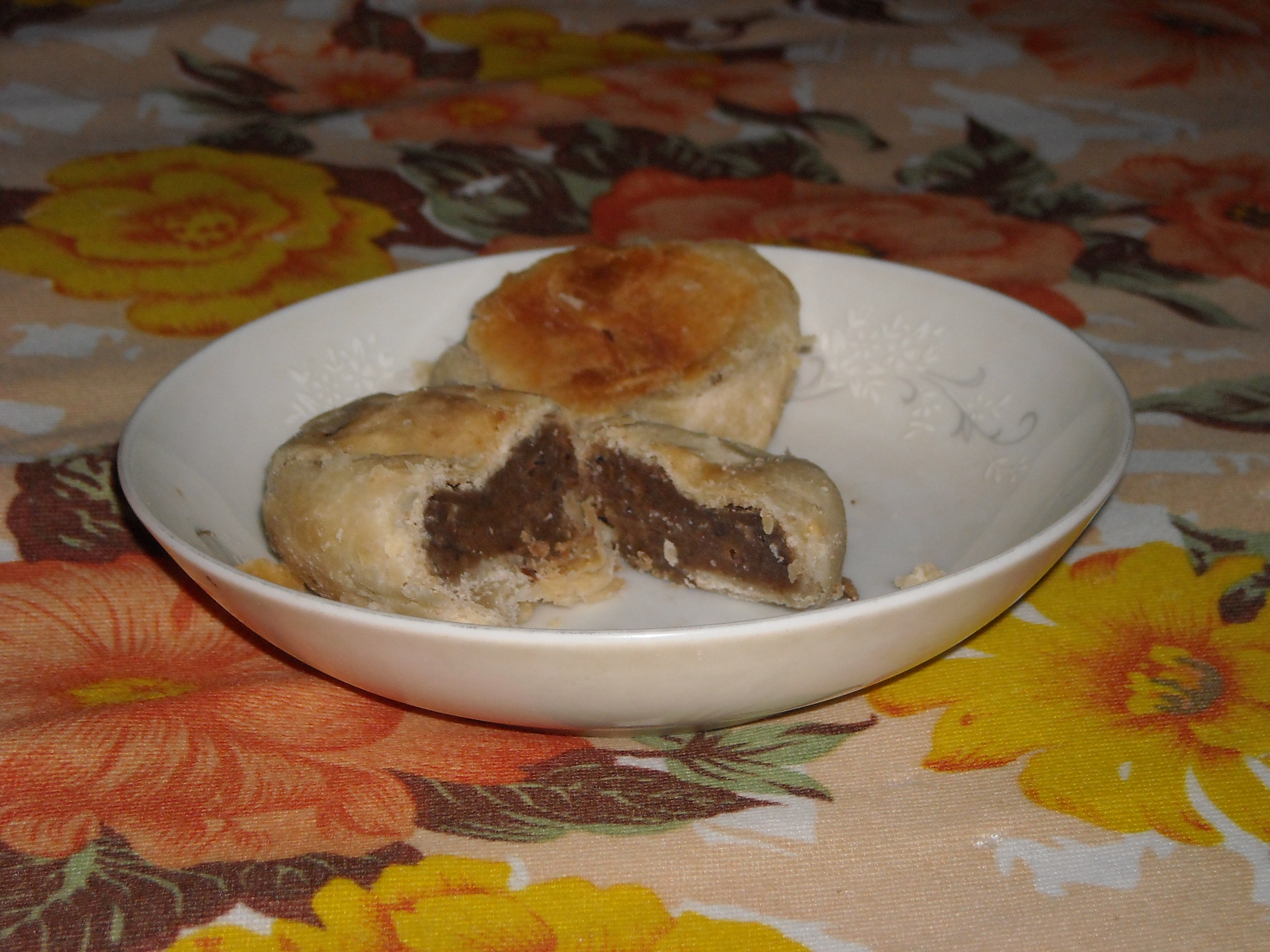
A pair of mung-bean hopias in a saucer

The most popular flaky bakpia in Indonesia and hopia in the Philippines is filled with mung bean, which is called in Indonesian: bakpia kacang hijau and in Filipino/Tagalog: Hopia mongo / Hopiang munggo, sometimes referred to in Tagalog: Hopiang matamis, lit. 'Sweet hopia'. As its name implies, it is filled with sweet split mung bean paste.

=== Pork ===
Pork hopia (Tagalog: Hopiang baboy / Hopia baboy) is filled with a savoury bread-crumb paste studded with candied wintermelon, flavoured with scallion and enriched with candied pork back fat, hence its name. This type of hopia is also sometimes referred to as hopiang maalat (Tagalog for "salty hopia").

=== Ube ===
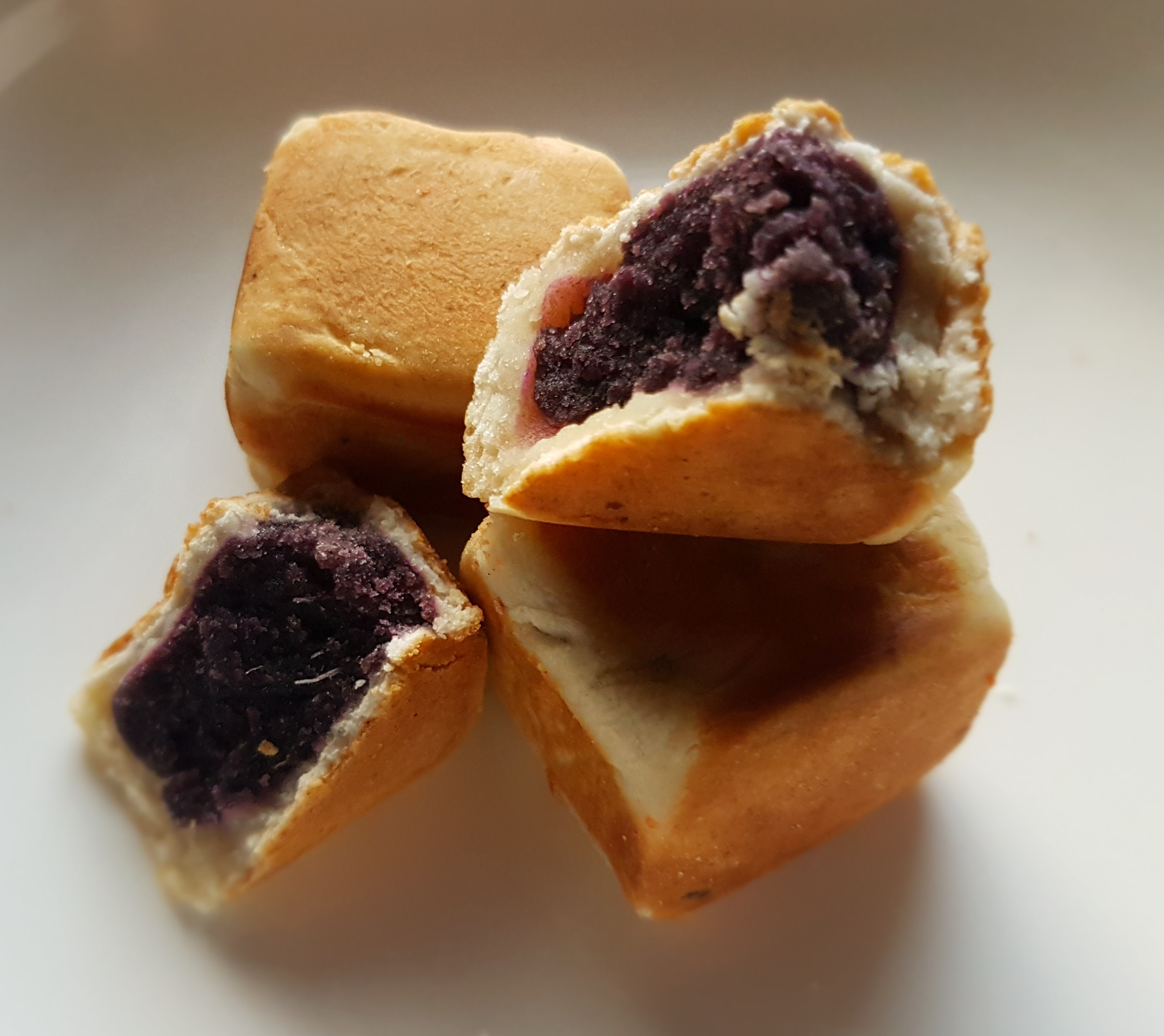
Ube hopia from the Philippines with the cake-type dough

Ube hopia (Tagalog: Hopia ube / Hopiang ube) is a variant of hopia from the Philippines which use ube. The filling is reminiscent of halayáng ube (ube jam), a traditional Filipino dessert eaten during Christmas season. Like other ube-based dishes, it has a unique, vivid violet colour and sweet taste.

Ube hopia was first introduced in the 1980s by Gerry Chua of Eng Bee Tin, a Chinese Filipino deli chain in the Binondo district of Manila noted for their fusion of Chinese and Filipino culinary traditions.

=== Azuki bean ===
A variant from the Philippines that uses red azuki bean paste is called in Tagalog: Hopia hapón / Hopiang hapón, lit. 'Japanese hopia'. It differs from other hopia in that it is made from cake dough. It is small and round and is similar in filling, crust texture, and style to the Japanese kuri manjū, hence its name. These are also often formed into cubes and cooked on a griddle one side at a time instead of being baked in an oven.

== See also ==
- Bánh pía
- Heong Peng
- Pan de monggo
