= Pastel de Camiguín =

Philippine bread with a custard filling

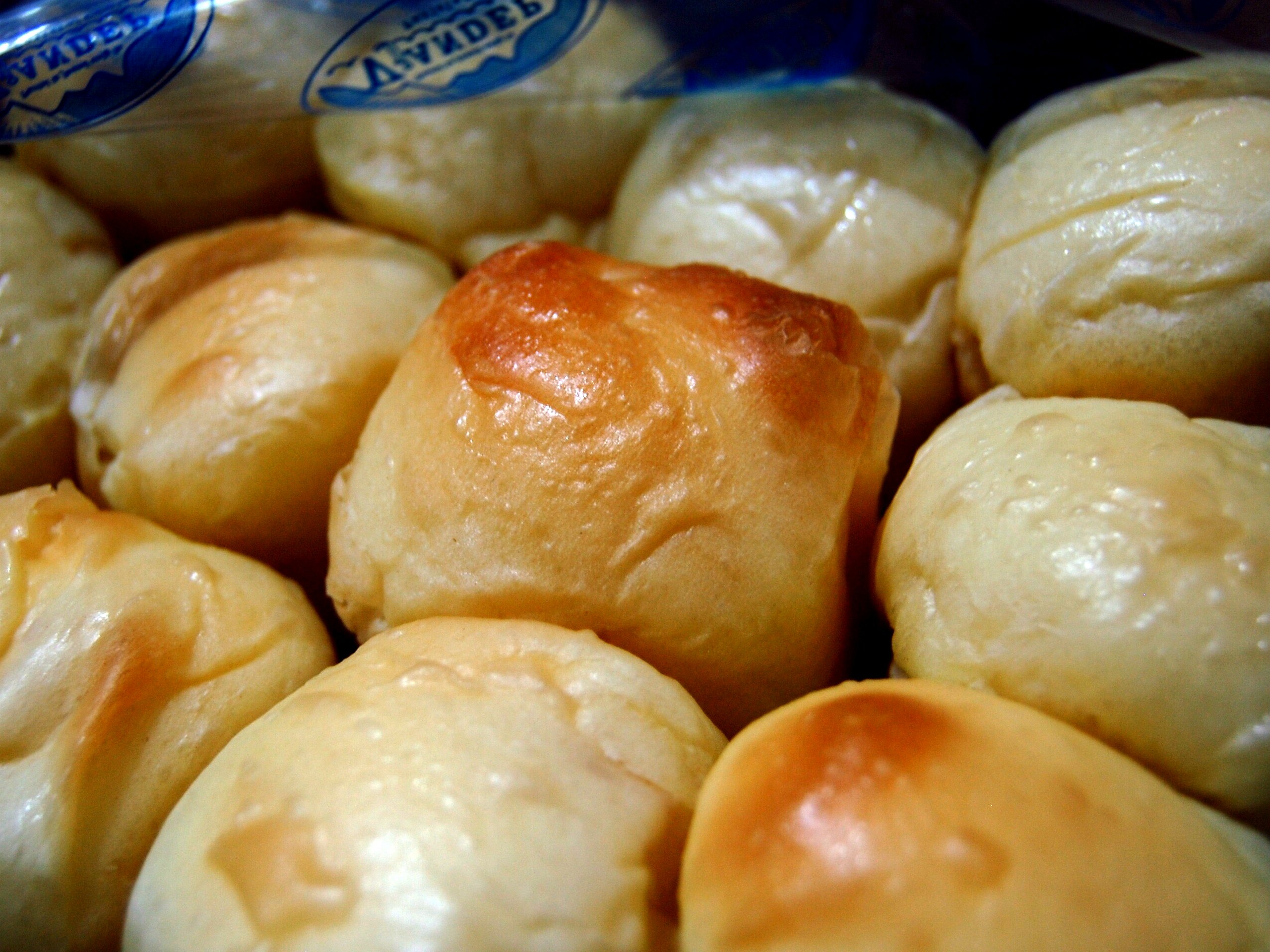
- Alternative names: Pastel, Camiguin pastel
- Place of origin: The Philippines
- Region or state: Camiguin

Pastel de Camiguín, (lit. 'Camiguin cake') or simply pastel, is a Filipino soft bun with yema (custard) filling originating from the province of Camiguin. The name is derived from Spanish pastel ("cake"). Pastel is an heirloom recipe originally conceived by Eleanor Popera Jose and the members of her family in Camiguin. She started to commercially sell it on January 8, 1990, using the money left over from her husband's Christmas bonus. The name of the business was Vjandep Pastel meaning Virgilio Jose and Eleanor Popera (VJ and EP). It is primarily produced at the time of family's special occasions and gatherings.

In addition to the original yema filling, pastel also feature other fillings, including ube, mocha, macapuno, cheese, chocolate, durian, jackfruit, and mango among others. Pastel is regarded as a pasalubong (regional specialty gifts) of Camiguin Island and nearby Cagayan de Oro.

== See also ==
- Leche flan
- Mamón
- Pan de siosa
- Pastillas
- Yema cake
