= Bánh pía =

Vietnamese pastry

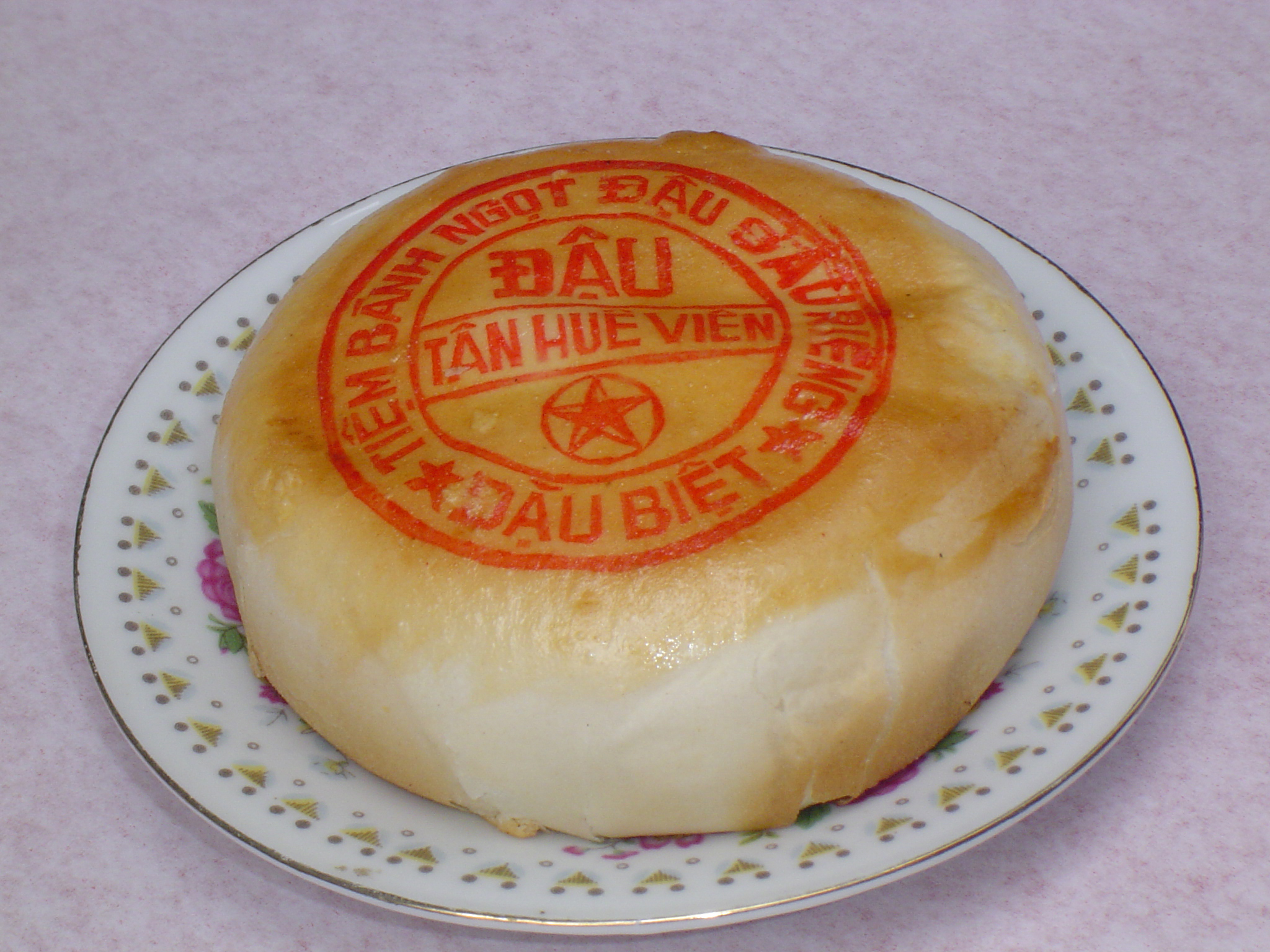
- Durian flavored bánh pía
- Alternative names: Bánh bía, bánh lột da
- Type: Pastry
- Course: Dessert, snack
- Place of origin: Chaozhou, China
- Region or state: Southeast Asia
- Similar dishes: Hopia and bakpia, heong peng, and other Chinese flaky pastries

Bánh pía (Vietnamese: [ɓaɲ˧˥ fia˧˥]), sometimes written as bánh bía, is a type of Vietnamese bánh (translated loosely as "cake" or "bread"). A Suzhou style mooncake adapted from Teochew cuisine, called "lâ-piáⁿ" (朥餅, Teochew Peng'im: la⁵ bian²). The Vietnamese name comes from the Teochew word for pastry, pia (餅 or 餠, Peng'im: bian², POJ: piáⁿ, round flat cake, pastry, cookie, biscuit).

In Saigon, the pastry is called bánh bía, while in Sóc Trăng and Vũng Thơm, it is known as bánh pía. Some Vietnamese people call it bánh lột da, which translates to "peeling flakes pastry". Those from the Bến Tre region call it bánh bao chi, which is the name for mochi elsewhere in Vietnam. Popular fillings include durian, shredded pork fat, salted egg yolk, mung bean paste, taro and coconut.
