= Heong peng =

Malaysian pastry dish

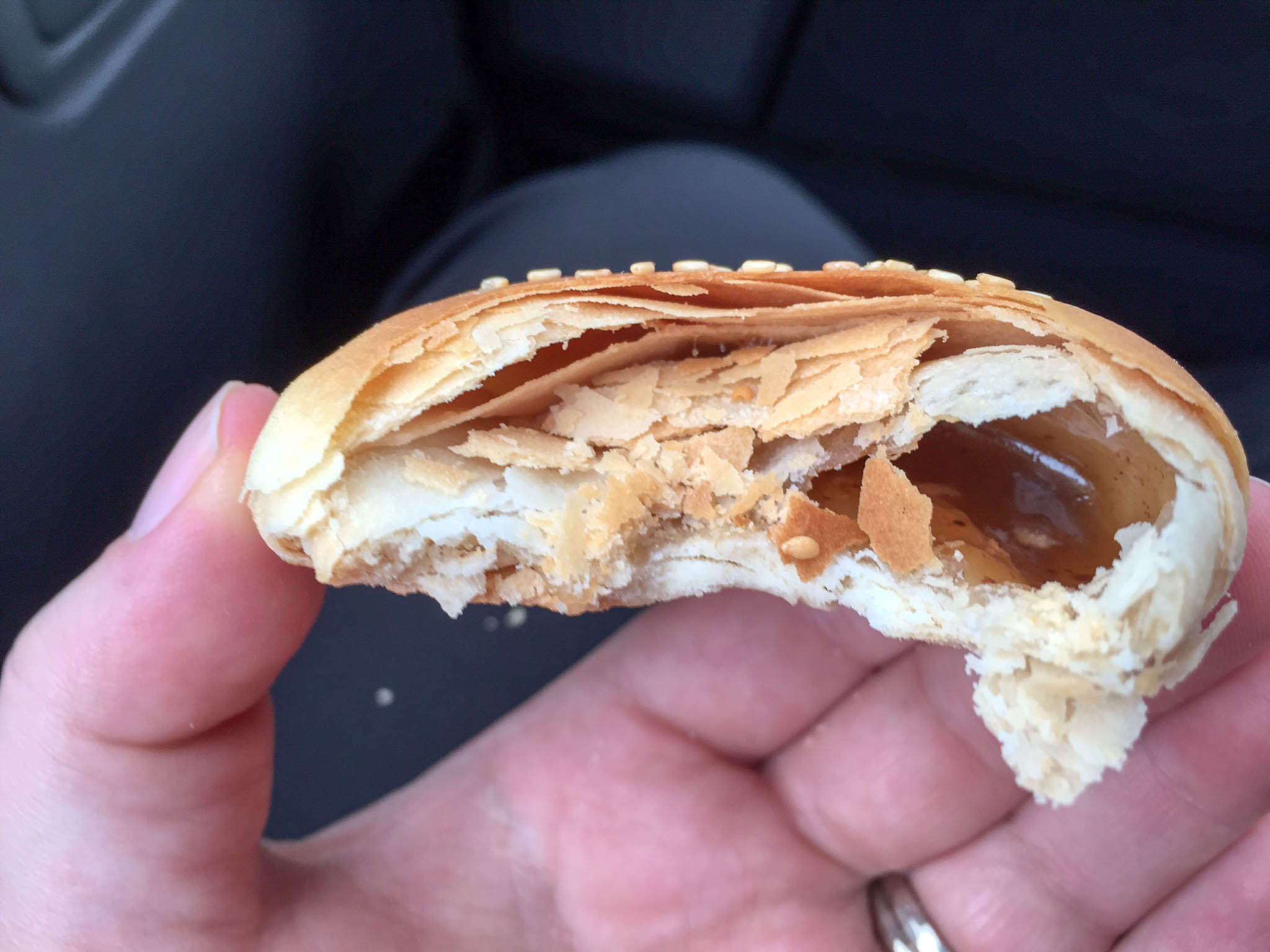
- Type: Pastry
- Place of origin: Malaysia
- Region or state: Perak; Penang; Kedah
- Main ingredients: Malt, shallots, sesame seeds
- Similar dishes: Hopia, Bakpia, banh pia, and other Chinese flaky pastries

Heong peng (Cantonese Chinese: 香餅; Jyutping: hoeng^{1} beng^{2}) or heong peah (Hokkien Chinese: 香餅; Pe̍h-ōe-jī: hioⁿ-piáⁿ / hiuⁿ-piáⁿ / hiauⁿ-piáⁿ), in English, are round hollow flaky pastries that contain a sweet sticky filling made from malt and shallots or brown sugar molasses, which is covered by a Chinese flaky pastry crust and garnished with sesame seeds on the surface. Originating in Teluk Intan in Perak, heong peng are available in many stores around Ipoh, and other parts of Malaysia and Singapore. Heong peng is popular with the Malaysian Chinese community, especially those in Northern Peninsular Malaysia.

== Names ==
Heong peng is the Cantonese pronunciation of Chinese: 香餅; lit. 'fragrant pastry', while heong peah is the Hokkien pronunciation of the same Chinese term. They are also known as beh teh soh (Chinese: 馬蹄酥; Pe̍h-ōe-jī: bé-tê-so͘; lit. 'horse hoof flaky pastry') in Hokkien.

== Packaging ==
In addition to the original maltose taste, the Malaysian cakes are also available in various flavors such as durian, coffee and pandan leaves. Cake shops in Penang, Kedah, Malacca and Johor have also started selling Heong peah cakes, becoming one of the local mainstream traditional pastries. The cake easily becomes wet and soft, so the local shops sell the cake in small units, usually in packs of eight or ten. Due to the low revenue, cheap red plastic bags are used to package the cake. On the days when these shops bake Heong peng cakes, they will hang signboards at the door to let the locals smell the cakes in order to entice them to buy them.

== See also ==
- List of pastries
- Hopia / Bakpia - Hokkien Chinese flaky pastry in the Philippines and Indonesia
