= Eng Bee Tin =

Chinese deli chain in the Philippines

Eng Bee Tin 永美珍

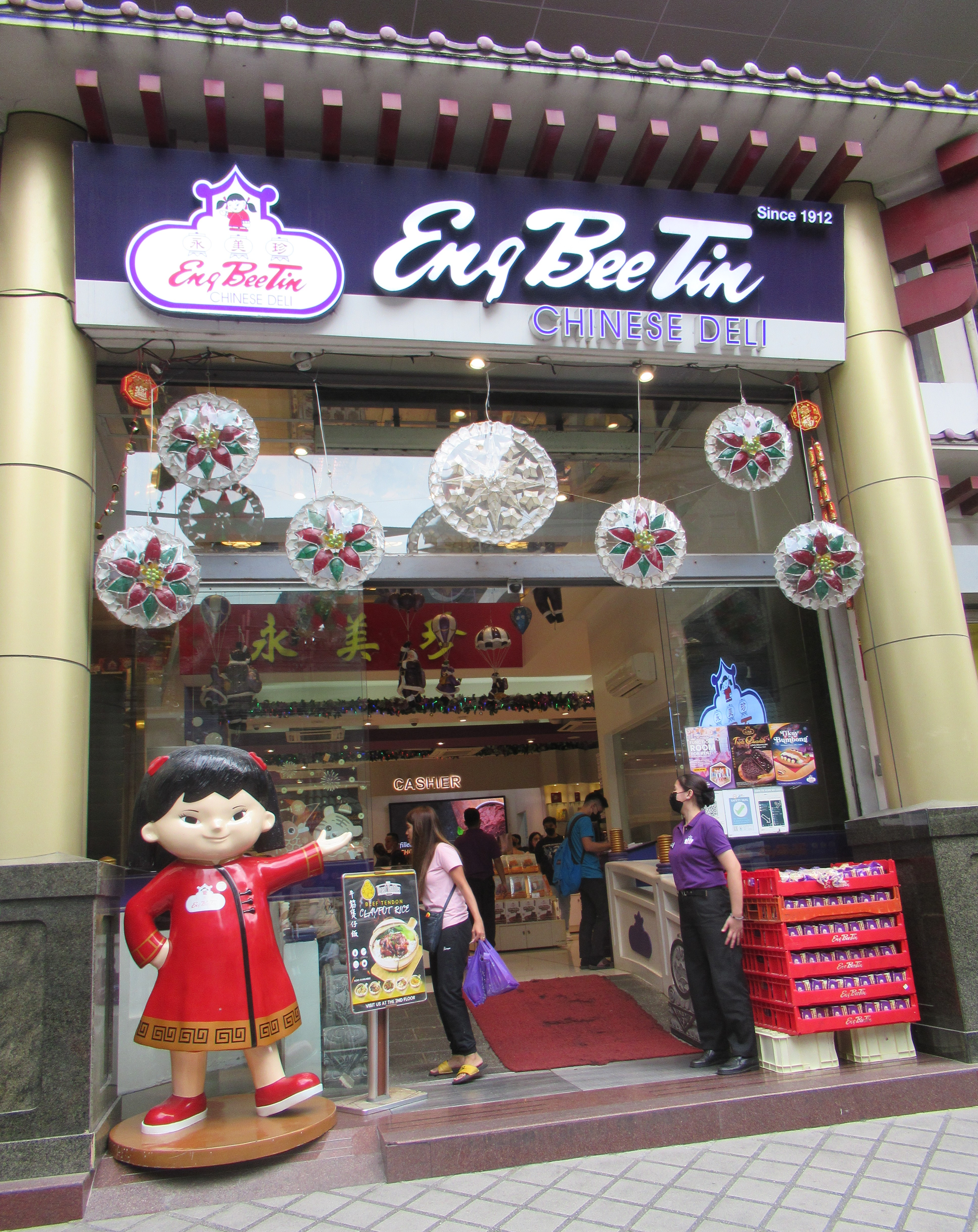
- Flagship store at Ongpin Street, Binondo, Manila
- Type: Private Company
- Industry: Food
- Founded: 1912; 114 years ago in Manila, Philippine Islands
- Founder: Chua Chiu Hong
- Headquarters: UBE Towers, 628 Ongpin St., Binondo, Manila, Philippines
- Key people: Gerry Chua (President)
- Products: Hopia; Tikoy; Mooncakes; Other Chinese Pastries; Philippine native delicacies
- Number of employees: 500
- Website: www.engbeetin.com

Eng Bee Tin Chinese Deli (Chinese: 永美珍食品廠; Pe̍h-ōe-jī: Éng-bí-tin Si̍t-phín-chhiúⁿ; pinyin: Yǒngměizhēn Shípǐnchǎng) is a Chinese deli chain based in Binondo, Manila, Philippines.

== History ==
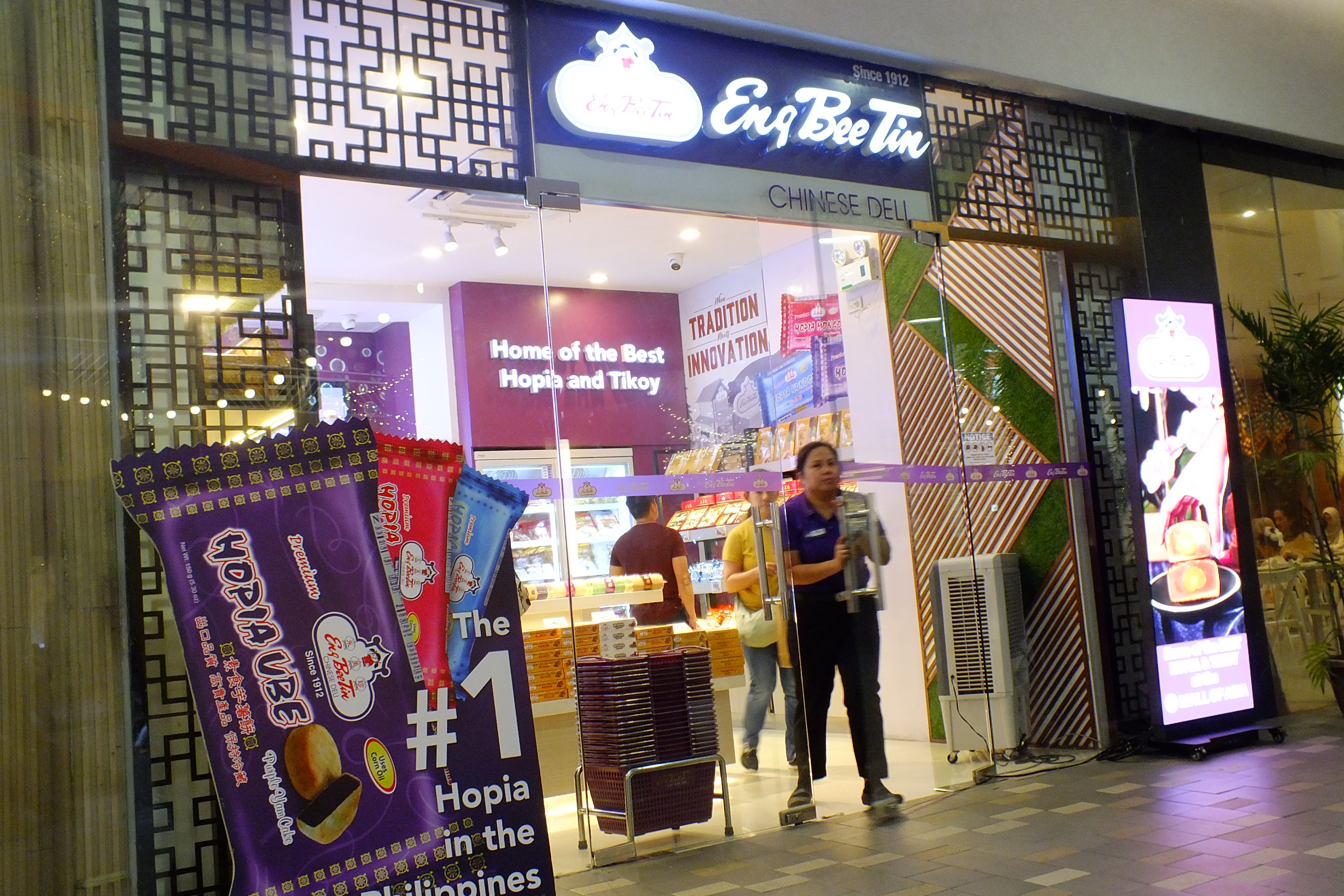
Eng Bee Tin branch at SM Mall of Asia

Eng Bee Tin was established in 1912 along Ongpin Street in Binondo, Manila by Chua Chiu Hong, a migrant from mainland China whose family decided to reside in the Philippines. The business started as a small stall.

In the 1970s, many stores selling Chinese delicacies competed with Eng Bee Tin and investors were reluctant to support the deli chain. Thus, Eng Bee Tin experienced financial difficulties and almost reached bankruptcy.

Chua Chiu Hong's grandson, Gerry Chua resolved the business' financial difficulties when he took over the family business in 1987 and introduced a hopia made from ube. He also developed a grinding process of making hopia from the root crop as well as a technique to make the food product creamier.

The hopia variant was created after Gerry Chua asked a saleslady of a supermarket about their bestselling ice cream flavor and the woman replied that it was ube. He went to Pampanga to learn how to work with ube halayá and developed the ube-flavored hopia.

He attempted to introduce ube hopia overseas but initial reception was poor. However, Eng Bee Tin eventually received orders from abroad.

Locally, ube hopia was well received when Eng Bee Tin introduced it. According to the Chua family, the business of Eng Bee Tin significantly improved when the store's signature ube hopia was featured in an episode of the television show Citiline by Cory Quirino. After the television feature, the store originally named Eng Bee Tin Hopia Factory was renamed to its current name as it began to sell other products besides hopia.

== Products ==
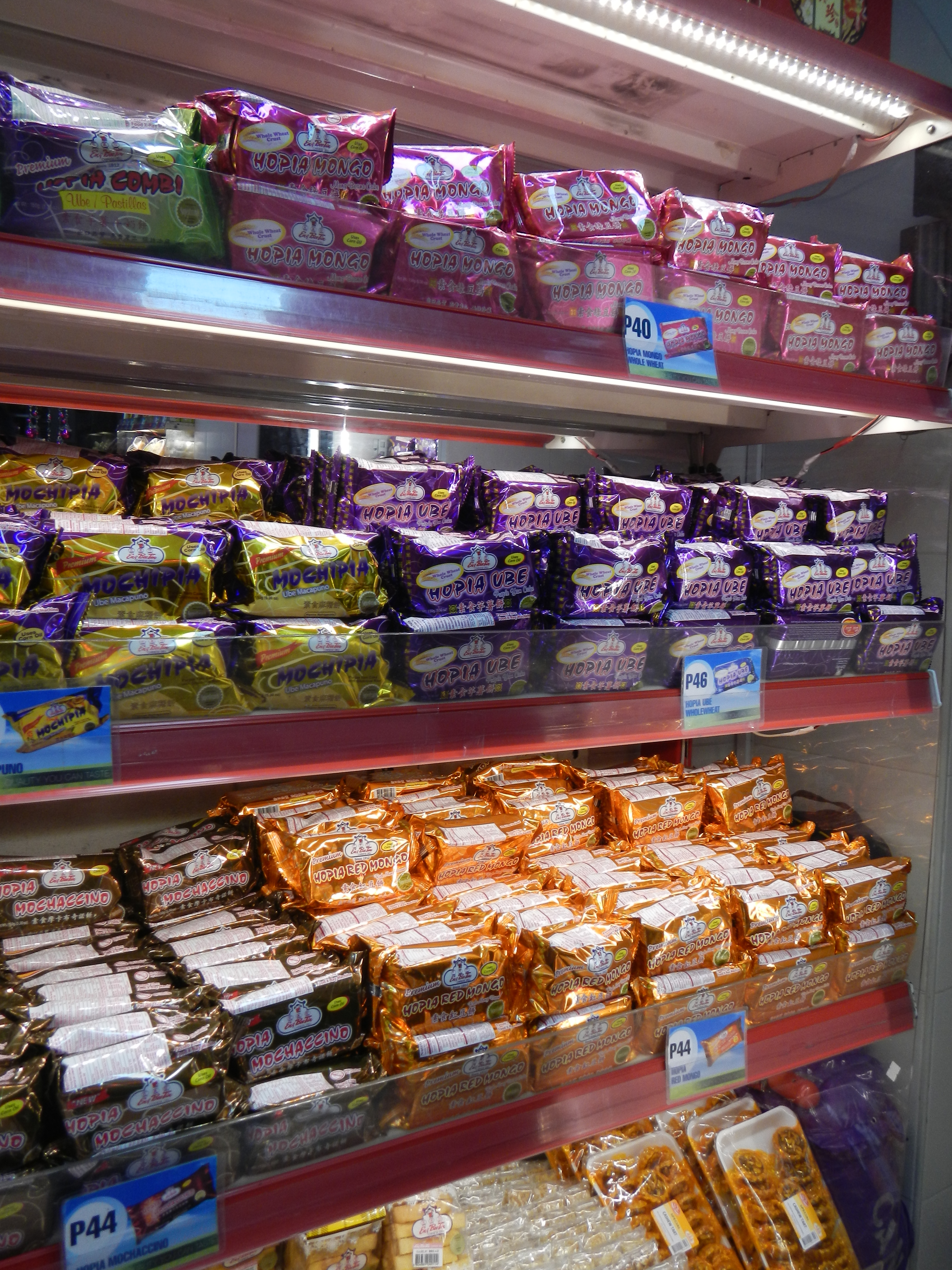
Eng Bee Tin hopias

The main product of Eng Bee Tin is the hopia ube. In 2013, it was reported that the hopia remains to be the product sold the most which has 22 variants. Other products they are famous for are mooncakes and tikoy, which are popular during the Mid-Autumn Festival and Chinese New Year, respectively.

In 2012, the most sold variants are the hopia ube and hopia mongo with the latter filled with mung beans. Both variants in the same year reportedly sells 4,000 to 5,000 packs a day, while the other variants sell 3,000 packs a day. The chain also sells sugar-free versions of their products.
