= Bakpia pathok =

Indonesian sweet roll

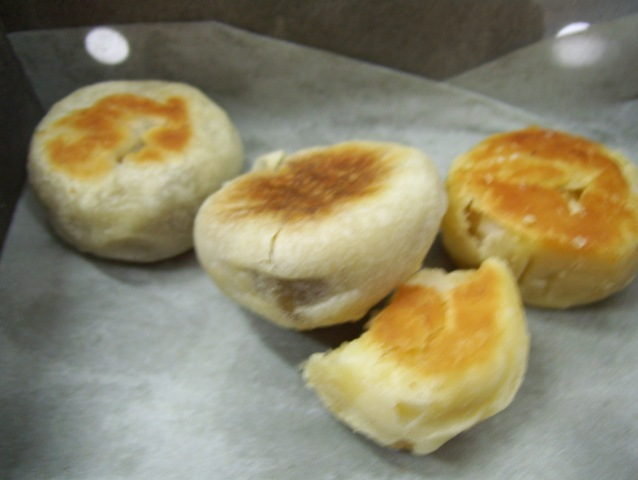
- Bakpia pathok
- Alternative names: Bakpia pathuk (Javanese)
- Type: Sweet roll, kue
- Course: Snack, appetizer, dessert
- Place of origin: Indonesia and China
- Region or state: Pathok, Yogyakarta, Special Region of Yogyakarta
- Serving temperature: Room temperature
- Main ingredients: Wheat flour, mung bean, sugar, vegetable oil / coconut oil
- Variations: Mung bean, chocolate, cheese, durian, taro, green tea

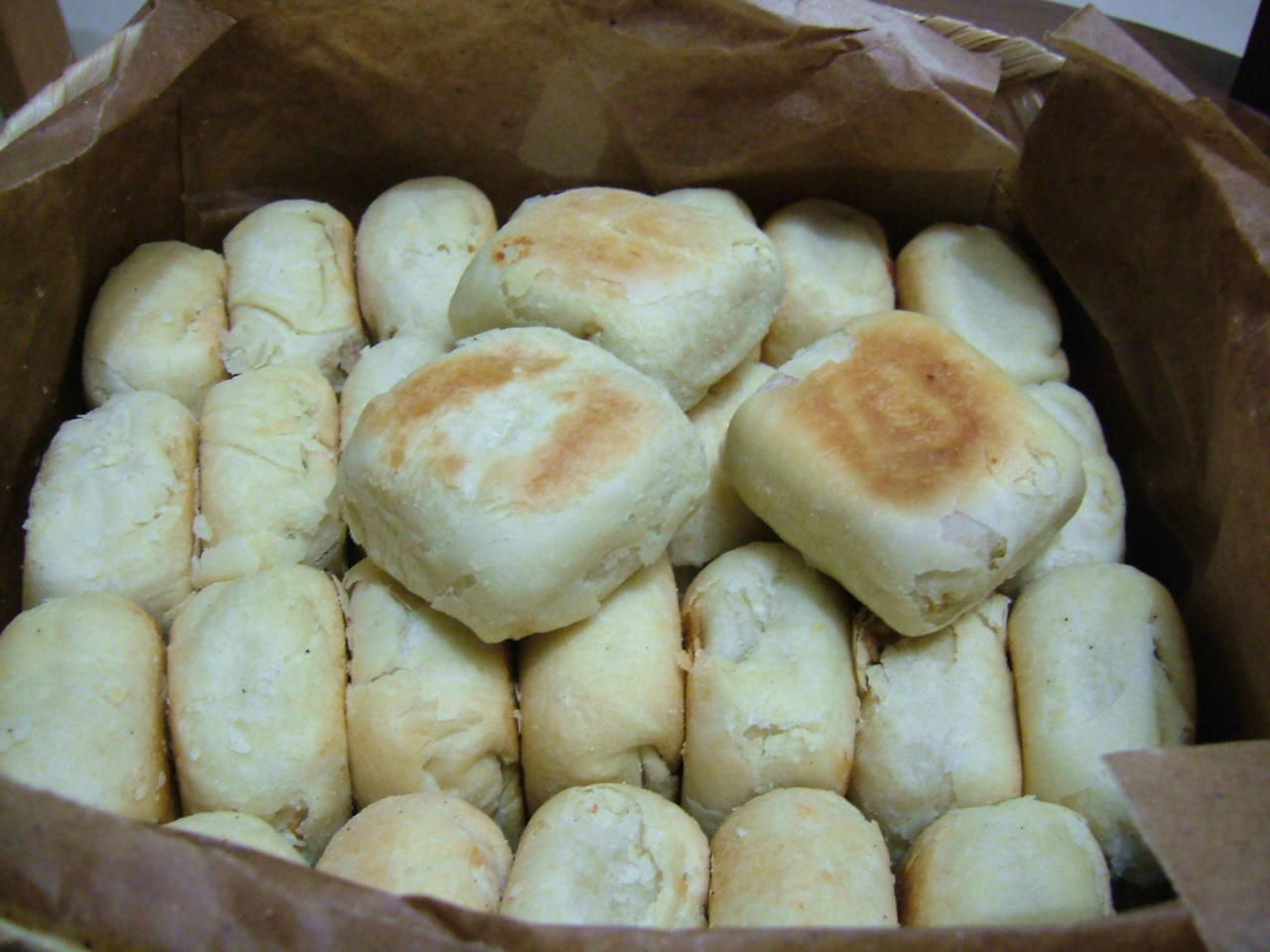
Bakpia pathok packed in a box

Bakpia pathok (Javanese: ꦧꦏ꧀ꦥꦶꦪꦥꦛꦸꦏ꧀, romanized: bakpia pathuk) is a small, round-shaped Chinese-influenced Indonesian sweet roll (bakpia), usually stuffed with mung beans, but have recently come in other fillings as well, such as chocolate, durian and cheese. This sweet roll is found in Javanese and Chinese Indonesian cuisine. They are one of Yogyakarta's specialties and are named after the Pathok suburb where the pastries originated.

Bakpia pathok is similar to the larger Indonesian pia, with the only difference being the size. They are commercially packaged in small boxes and sold at many food shops in Yogyakarta.

== History ==
Bakpia pathok was estimated brought to Yogyakarta by a merchant from China named Kwik Sun Kwok in the 1940s. The dish initially had meat fillings and used pork. Later on, a version with mung bean fillings was developed, and this version remains popular to this day. The Pathuk subdistrict in Yogyakarta started producing their version of bakpia in the 1980s, which became the regional standard. To differentiate their products, bakpia pathok makers named their products after their house number (e.g., Bakpia Pathok 25, Bakpia Pathok 75), a practice that remains to this day. However, newer bakpia pathok makers may use different naming standards.

== Ingredients ==
The dough for bakpia pathok is made out of flour, salt, and coconut oil. Traditionally, bakpia pathok's filling is a combination of mungbean and sugar. However, modern variants of bakpia pathok often offer fillings with flavors such as chocolate and taro.
