= Putok =

Filipino bread roll

Putok ni Joyce Gascon
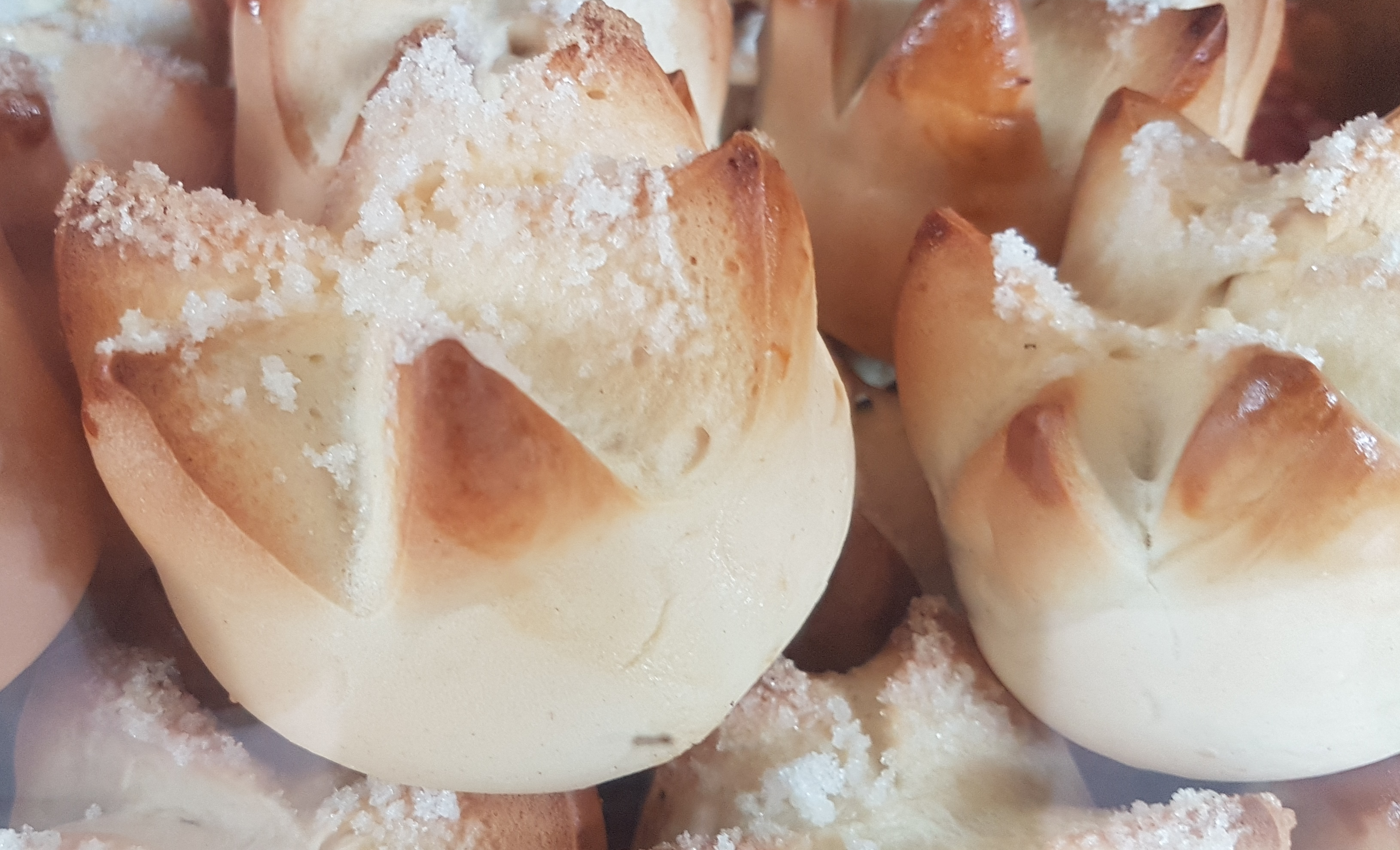
- Alternative names: Star bread
- Type: Bread roll
- Place of origin: Philippines

Putok, also known as "star bread", is a dense bread roll from the Philippines. It is made with all-purpose flour, milk, and salt, then typically dusted with coarse white sugar. It is a variant of pan de manananggal (pakpak) distinguished primarily by the crown or star-shaped top of the bread, resulting from a cross-shaped cut on the dough prior to baking. The name literally means "explosion", or "fissure", in Tagalog.

== See also ==
- Pandesal
- Pinagong
- List of bread rolls
