= Monay (bread) =

Filipino bread

Pan de monja
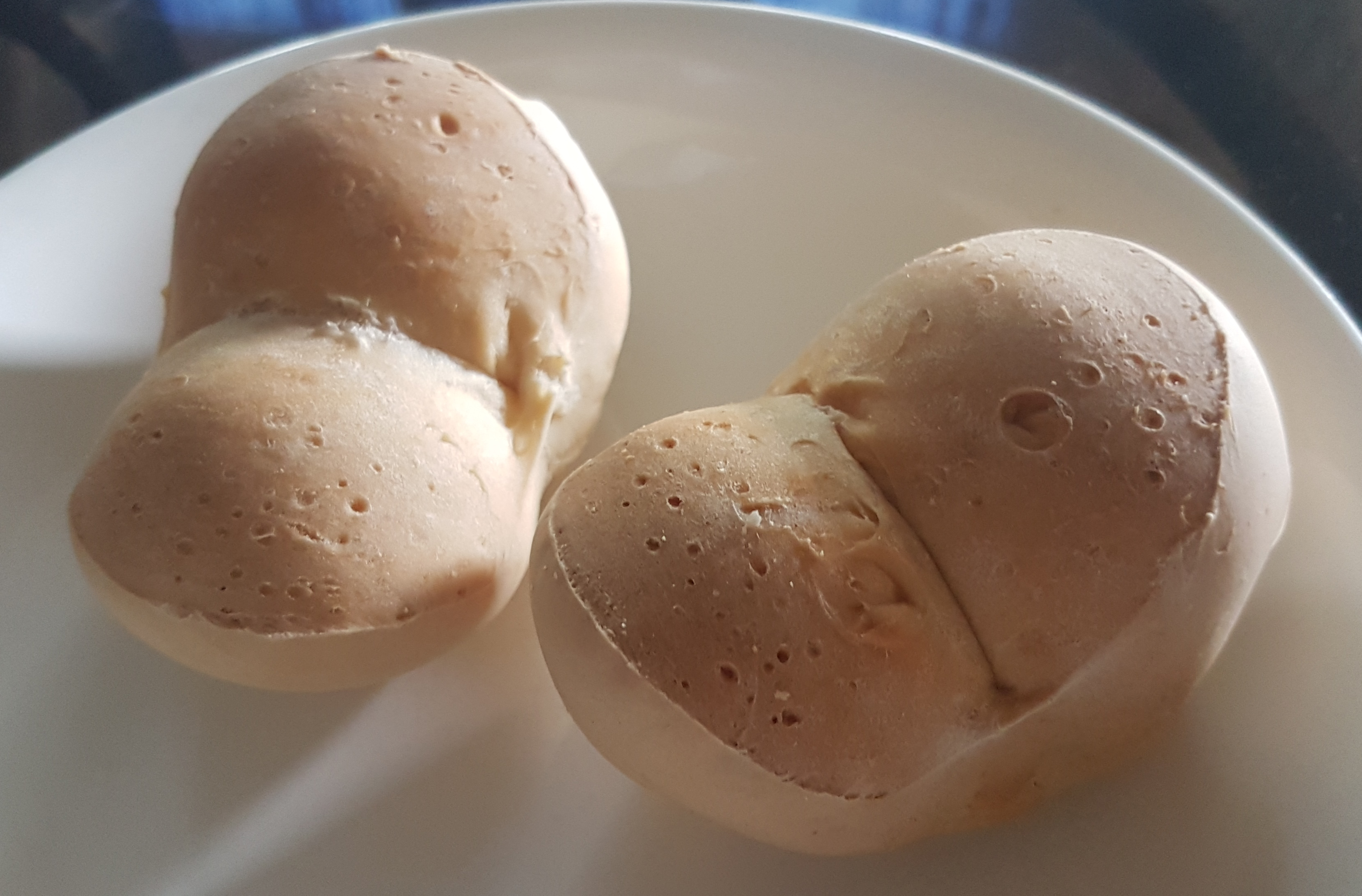
- Alternative names: monay, pan de monay
- Type: Bread roll
- Place of origin: Philippines

Monay (Tagalog pronunciation: [ˈmonaj] moh-NY), also known as pan de monja, is a dense bread roll from the Philippines made with all-purpose flour, milk, and salt. It has a characteristic shape, with an indentation down the middle dividing the bread into two round halves. It is a common humble fare, usually eaten for merienda with cheese or dipped in hot drinks.

It is one of the most basic bread types in the Philippines and is sometimes known as the "mother of all Filipino breads" as it can be modified to give rise to various other bread types.

== Etymology ==
The name pan de monja means "cloistered nun's bread". This evolved into the colloquial name pan de monáy or simply monáy in Filipino.

== Description ==
Monay is made with all-purpose flour or bread flour dough, mixed with milk (usually powdered milk), yeast, egg yolks, and a small amount of salt, sugar, and butter. The dough is kneaded into a ball and allowed to rest for a couple of hours until the dough doubles in size. It is then rolled into a cylinder, cut into small chunks, and shaped. It is usually brushed with an egg wash on top before being baked. Monay is traditionally slightly yellow or yellow-brown, but modern commercial variants are paler brown.

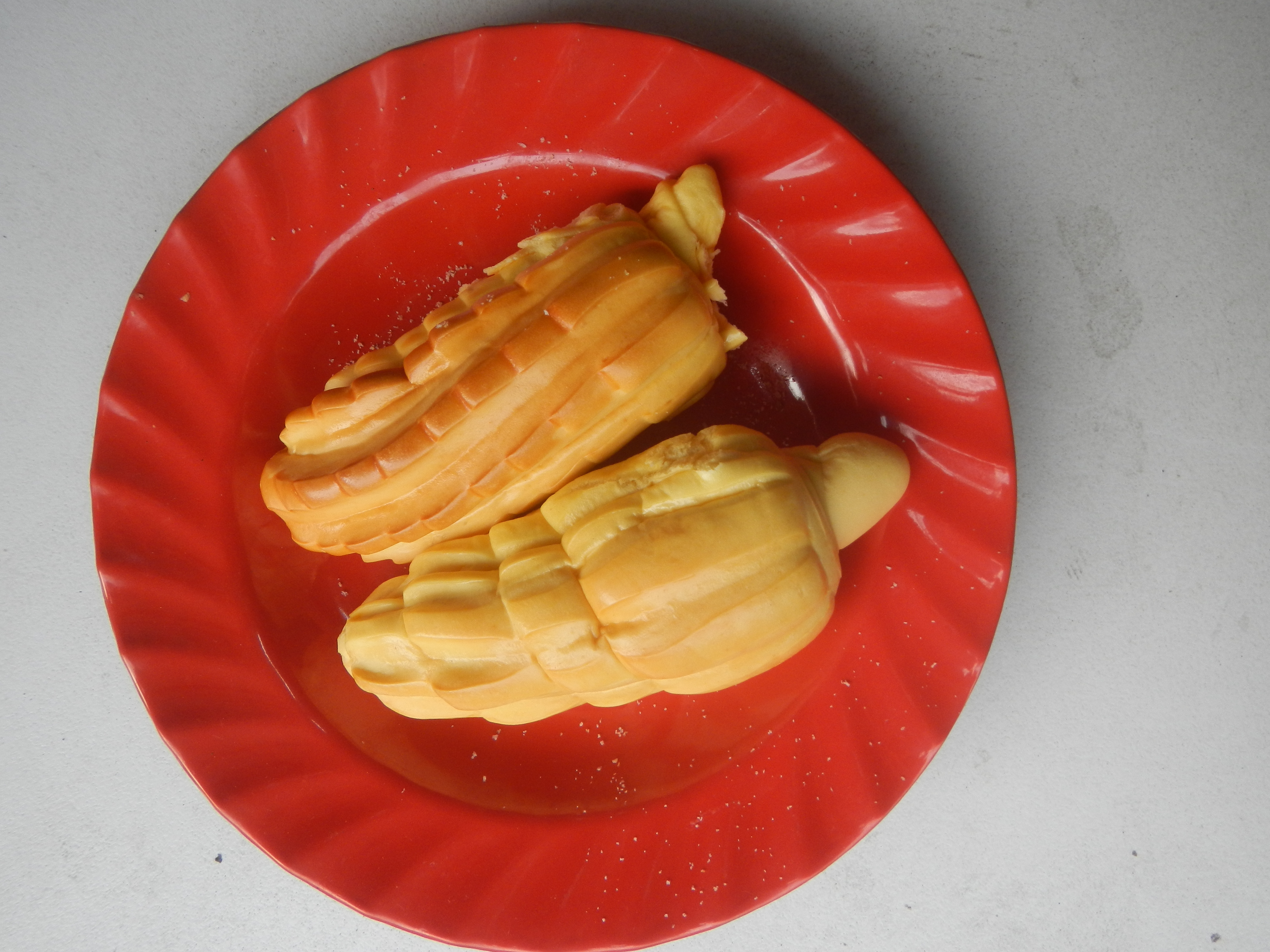
Pinagong

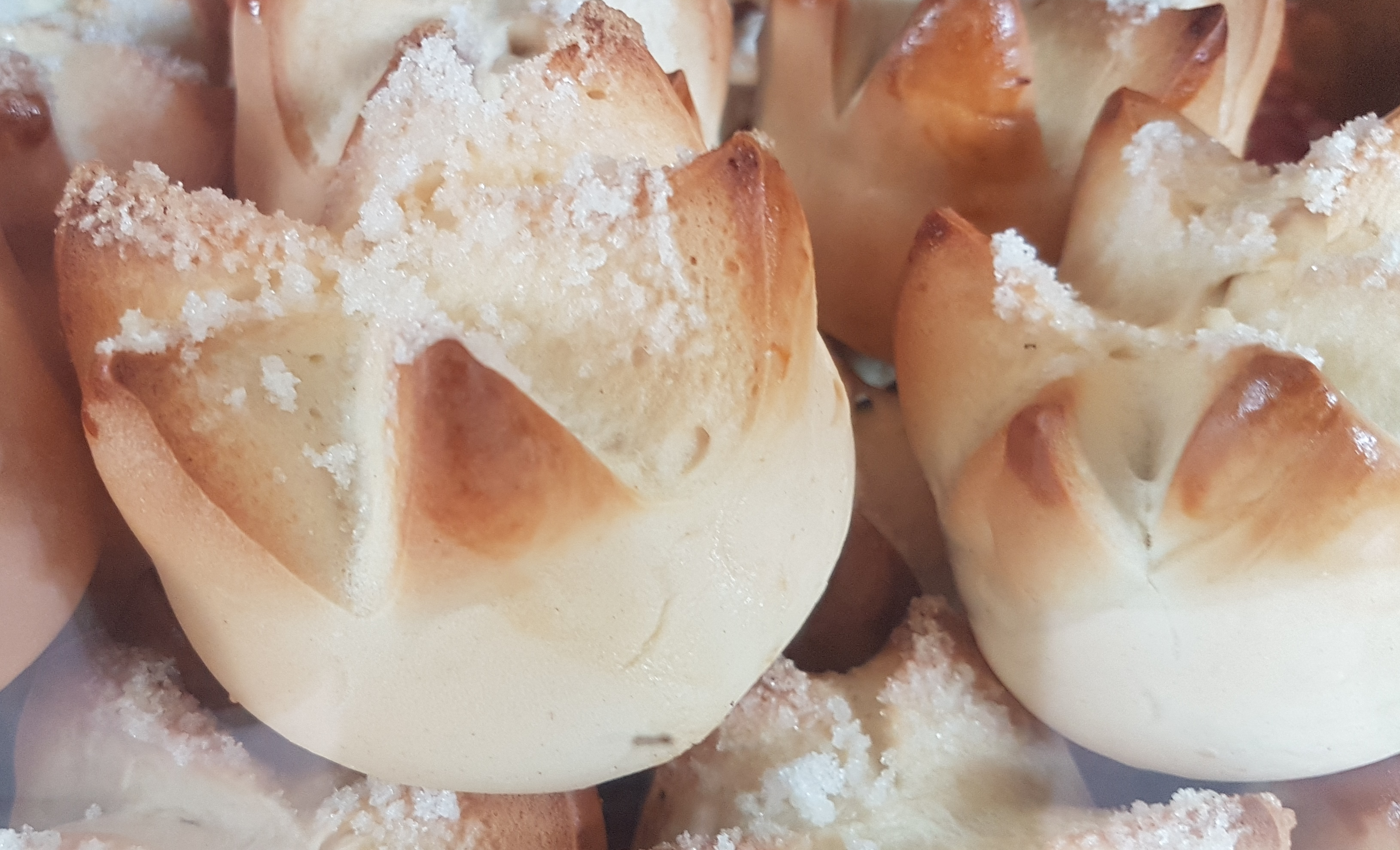
Putok

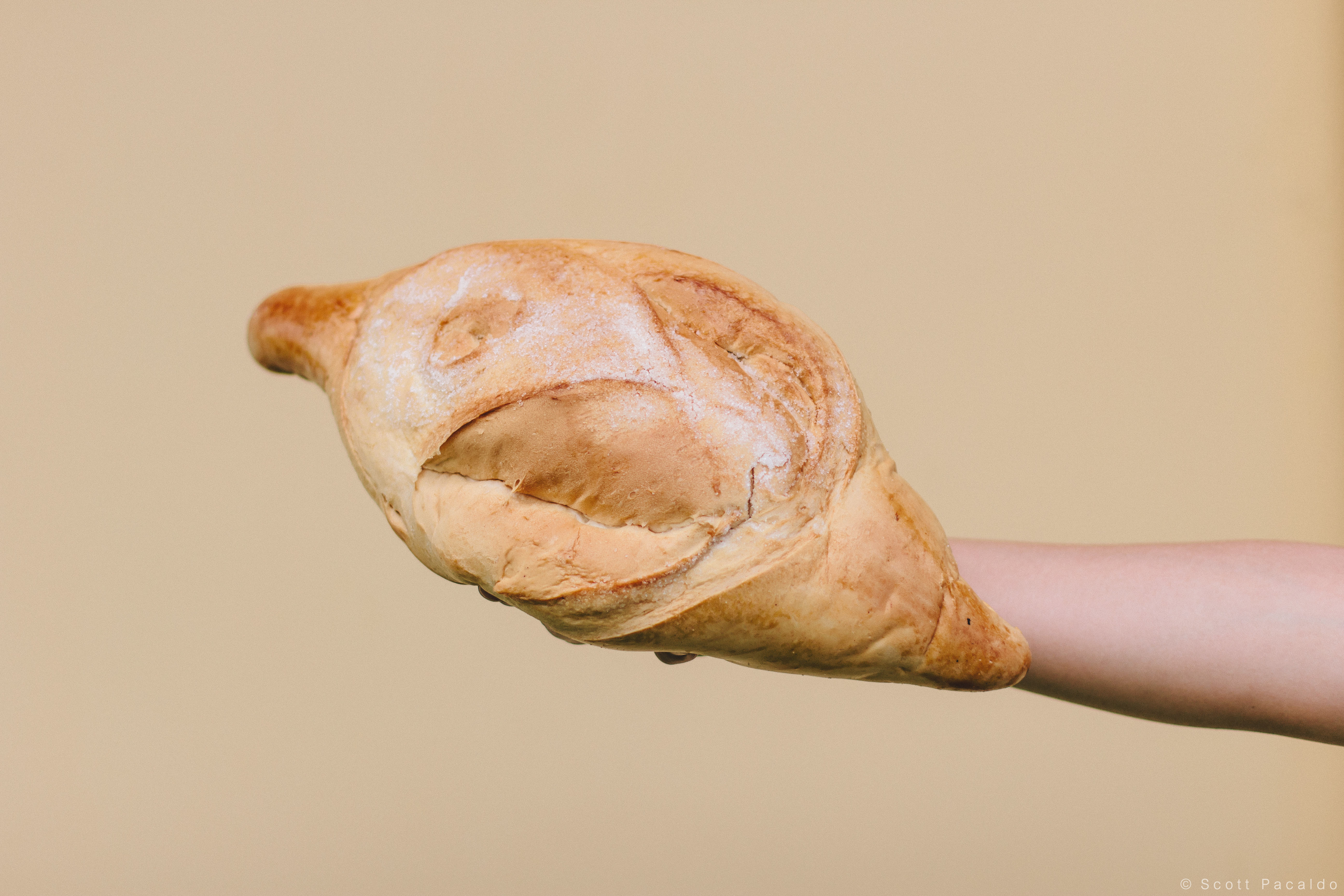
A large version of Pinagong

Monay is one of the most basic bread types in the Philippines and is sometimes known as the "mother of all Filipino breads" as it can be modified to give rise to various other bread types. These include breads like pinagong and putok.

== In popular culture ==
The distinctive shape of the bread has often been compared to the shape of the buttocks or female genitalia. In certain regions in the Philippines, "monay" is used as slang for the latter. Some modern versions omit the indentation for this reason or change the name.

== See also ==
- Pan de regla
- Pandesal
- Pan de siosa
- List of bread rolls
