= Pan de coco =

Philippine sweet bread

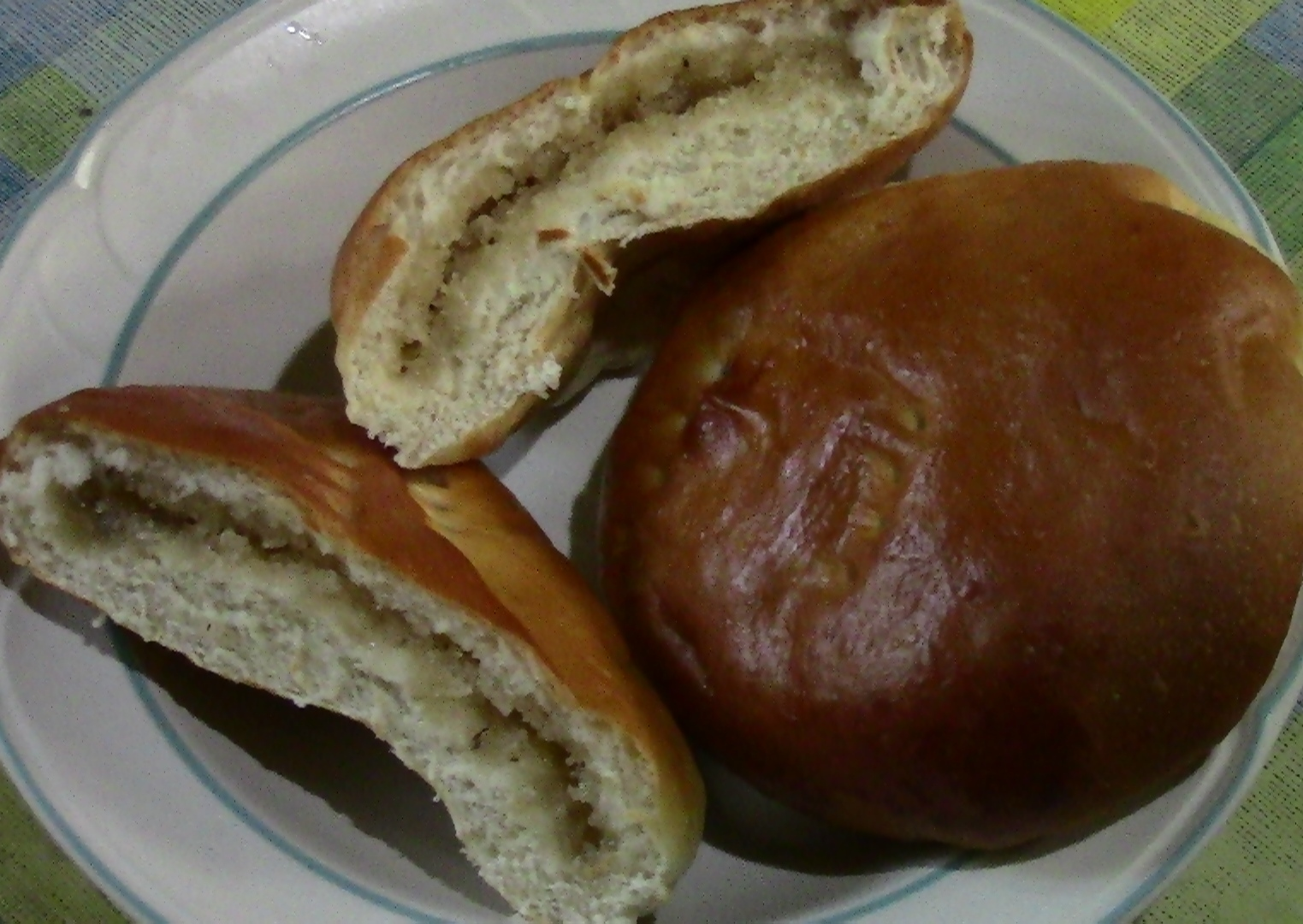
- Pan de coco from the Philippines, about 4 and a half inches in diameter.
- Type: Sweet roll
- Place of origin: Philippines
- Main ingredients: coconut

Pan de coco, literally "coconut bread" in Spanish, is a Filipino rich sweet roll that uses sweetened shredded coconut meat (bukayo) as filling.

It is one of the most popular types of bread in the Philippines, usually part of the "Filipino bread basket" with the Filipino "Spanish bread" and pan de sal, commonly served for breakfast or merienda.

== See also ==
- Asado roll
- Pandesal
- Pan de monja (Monáy)
- Queijadinha
- Wingko
- Serabi
