= Pandesal =

Type of Philippine bread

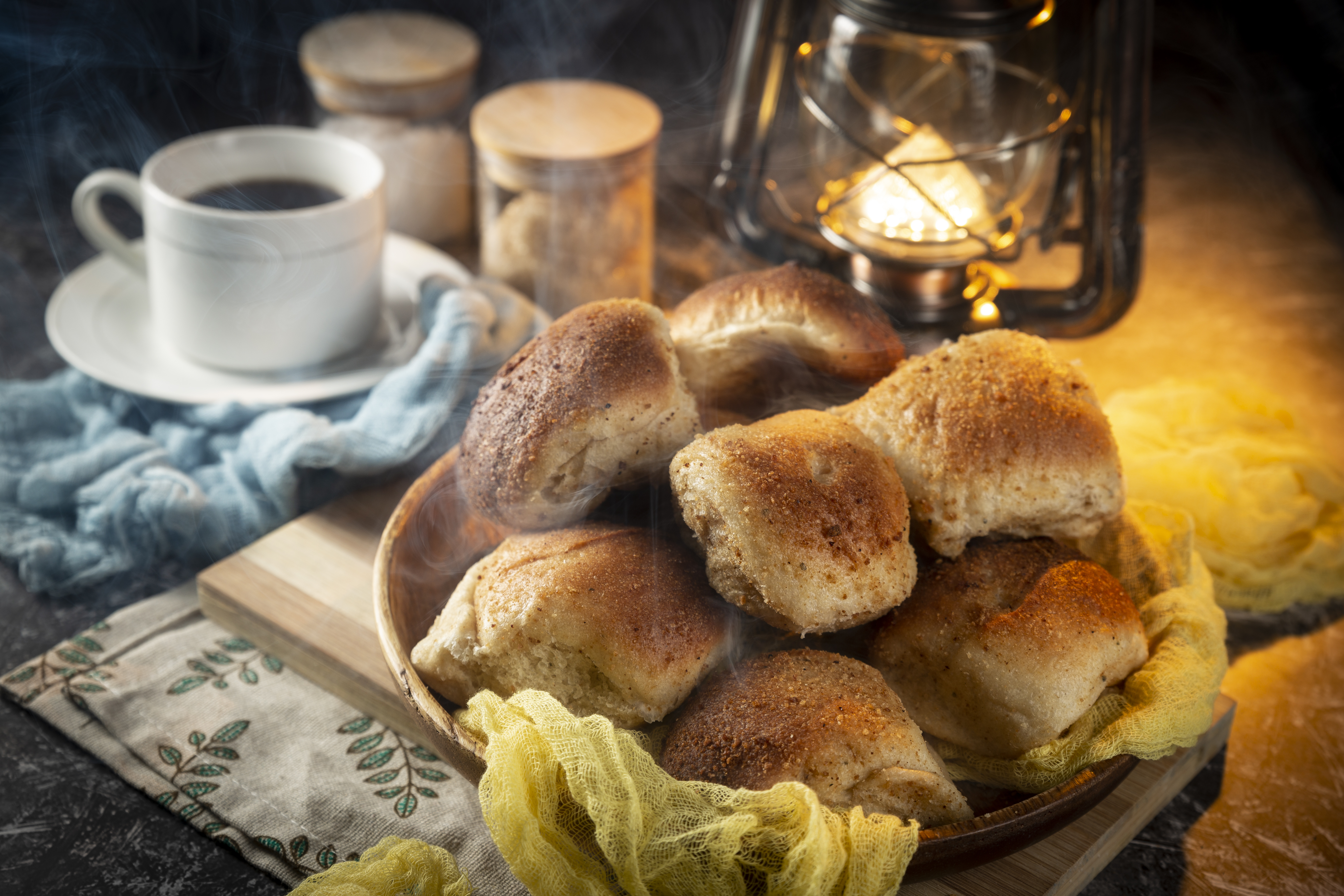
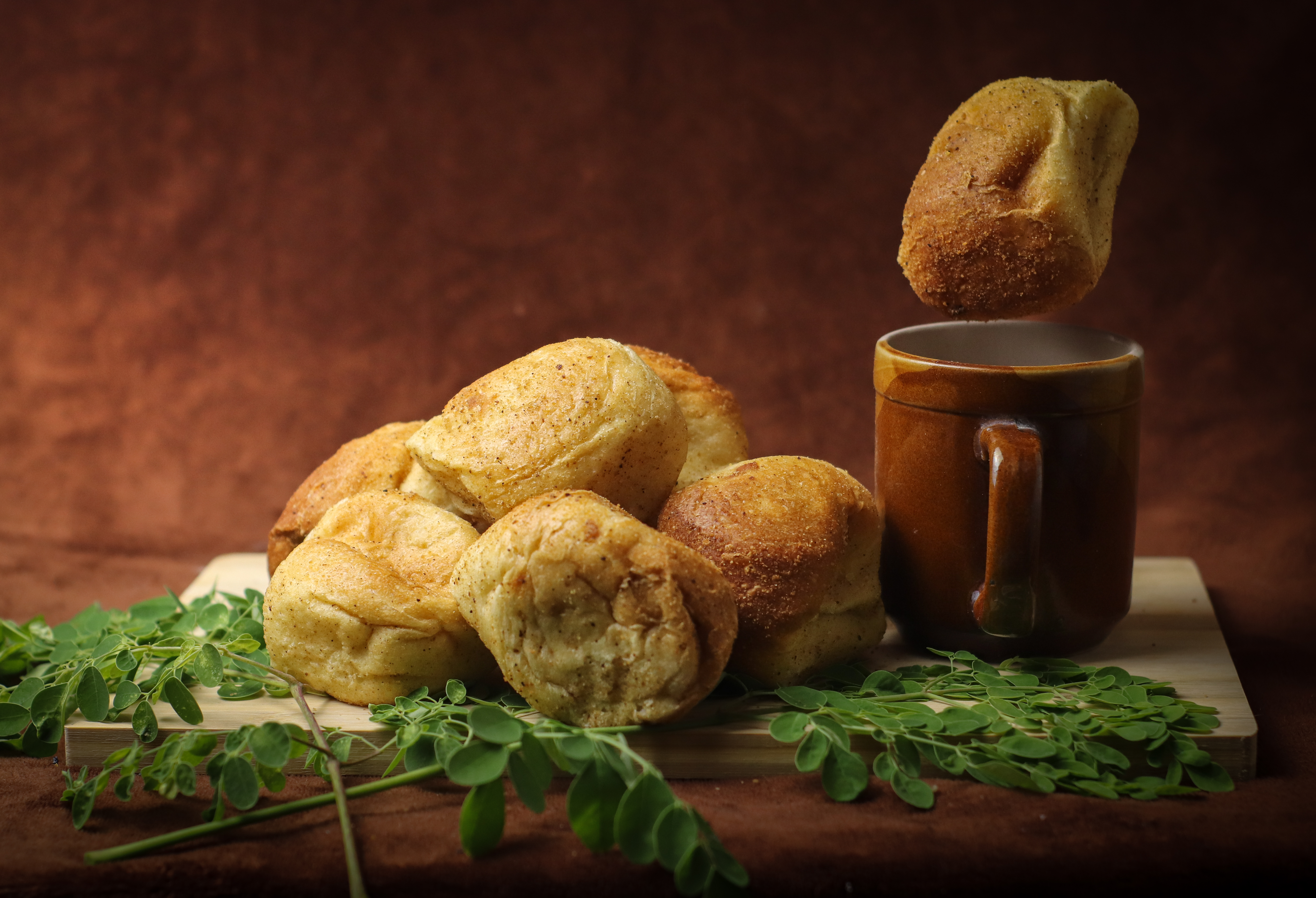
- Alternative names: Pan de sal
- Type: Bread roll
- Course: Breakfast
- Place of origin: The Philippines
- Main ingredients: Flour, yeast, sugar, salt, oil
- Food energy (per serving): 175 kcal (730 kJ)

Pandesal, also written as pan de sal or pandisal (Spanish: pan de sal, lit. "bread of salt" “hot bread”), is a staple bread roll in the Philippines commonly eaten for breakfast. It is made of flour, yeast, sugar, oil, and salt.

== Description ==
Pandesal is a popular yeast-raised bread in the Philippines. Individual loaves are shaped by rolling the dough into long logs (bastón, Spanish for "stick") which are rolled in fine bread crumbs. These are then portioned, allowed to rise, and baked.

It is most commonly served hot and may be eaten as is, or dipped in coffee, tsokolate (hot chocolate), or milk. It can also be complemented with butter, margarine, cheese, jam, peanut butter, chocolate spread, or other fillings like eggs, sardines and meat.

Its taste and texture closely resemble those of the Puerto Rican pan de agua and the Mexican bolillos. Contrary to its name, pandesal tastes slightly sweet rather than salty. Most bakeries produce pandesal in the morning for breakfast consumption, though some bake pandesal the whole day.

== Variants ==
Some pandesal in supermarkets and some bakeries are less crusty and lighter in color. These also tend to have more sugar than the traditional pandesal, which only has 1.75% sugar.

On Siargao Island, famous as a surfing spot, an oval-shaped version is locally known as "pan de surf" as it resembles a surfboard. It is baked on makeshift ovens fueled with coconut husks, and usually sold alongside pan de coco.

Dried and ground-up malunggay or moringa leaves are sometimes mixed into the flour for added nutritional content; this is called "malunggay pandesal" or "malunggay bread". A popular new variant of pandesal is ube cheese pandesal, which has a purple yam (ube) and cheese filling. It is characteristically purple like all ube-based dishes. Other contemporary variants include chocolate, matcha, strawberry and blueberry flavors.

A soft, yellowish type of Filipino bread roll that is similar to pandesal except that it uses eggs, milk, and butter or margarine is known as Spanish bread, Señorita bread, or pan de kastila. Unlike the pandesal, it commonly has sweet fillings. It is unrelated to the Spanish pan de horno (also known in English as "Spanish bread").

== History ==
The precursor of the pandesal was pan de suelo ("[oven] floor bread"), a local Spanish-Filipino version of the French baguette baked directly on the floor of a wood-fired oven called a pugón. It was made with wheat flour and was harder and crustier than the pandesal. Since wheat is not natively produced in the Philippines, bakers eventually switched to more affordable yet inferior flour, resulting in the softer, doughy texture of the pandesal.

Pandesal flourished in the American colonial era in the early 1900s, when cheaper American wheat became readily available. It has since become a staple breakfast bread in the Philippines. Baking of pandesal in pugón has declined due to a nationwide ban on cutting mangrove trees for fuel, and bakers shifted to using gas-fired ovens.

== Gallery ==
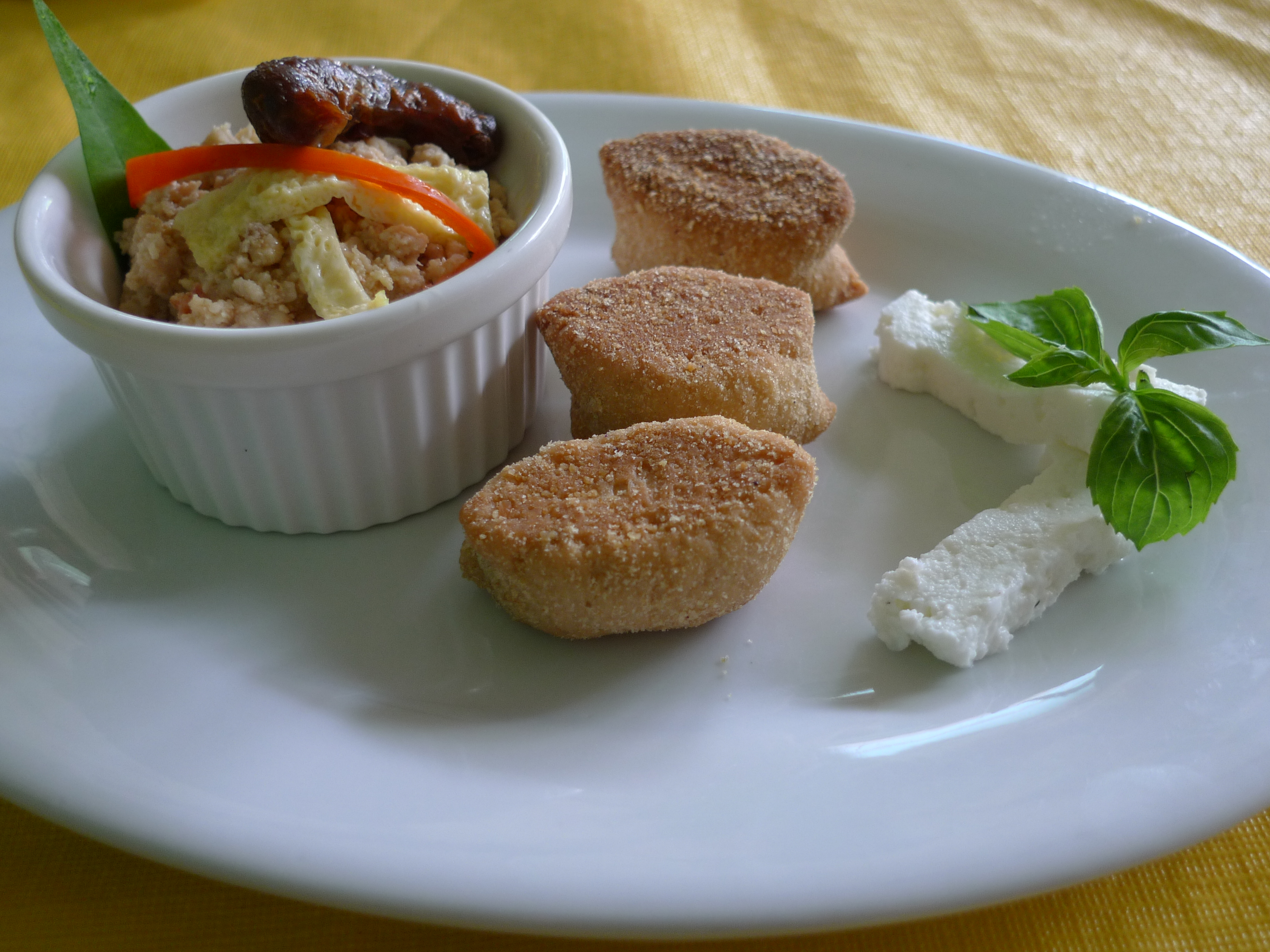
Traditional full Filipino breakfast with kesong puti, pandesal, sinangag (garlic rice), and a longganisa sausage

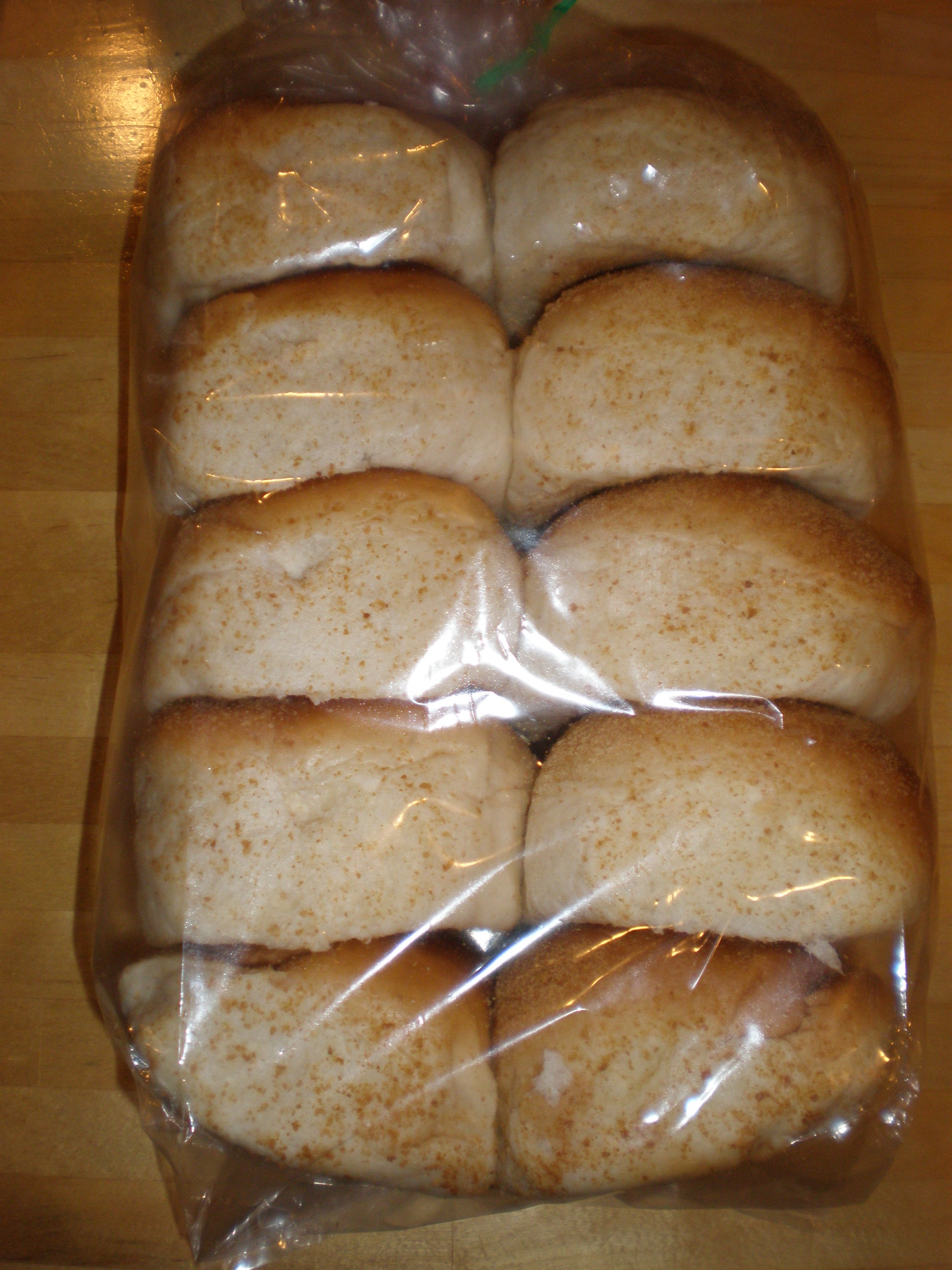
Pandesal plastic-wrapped for the grocers

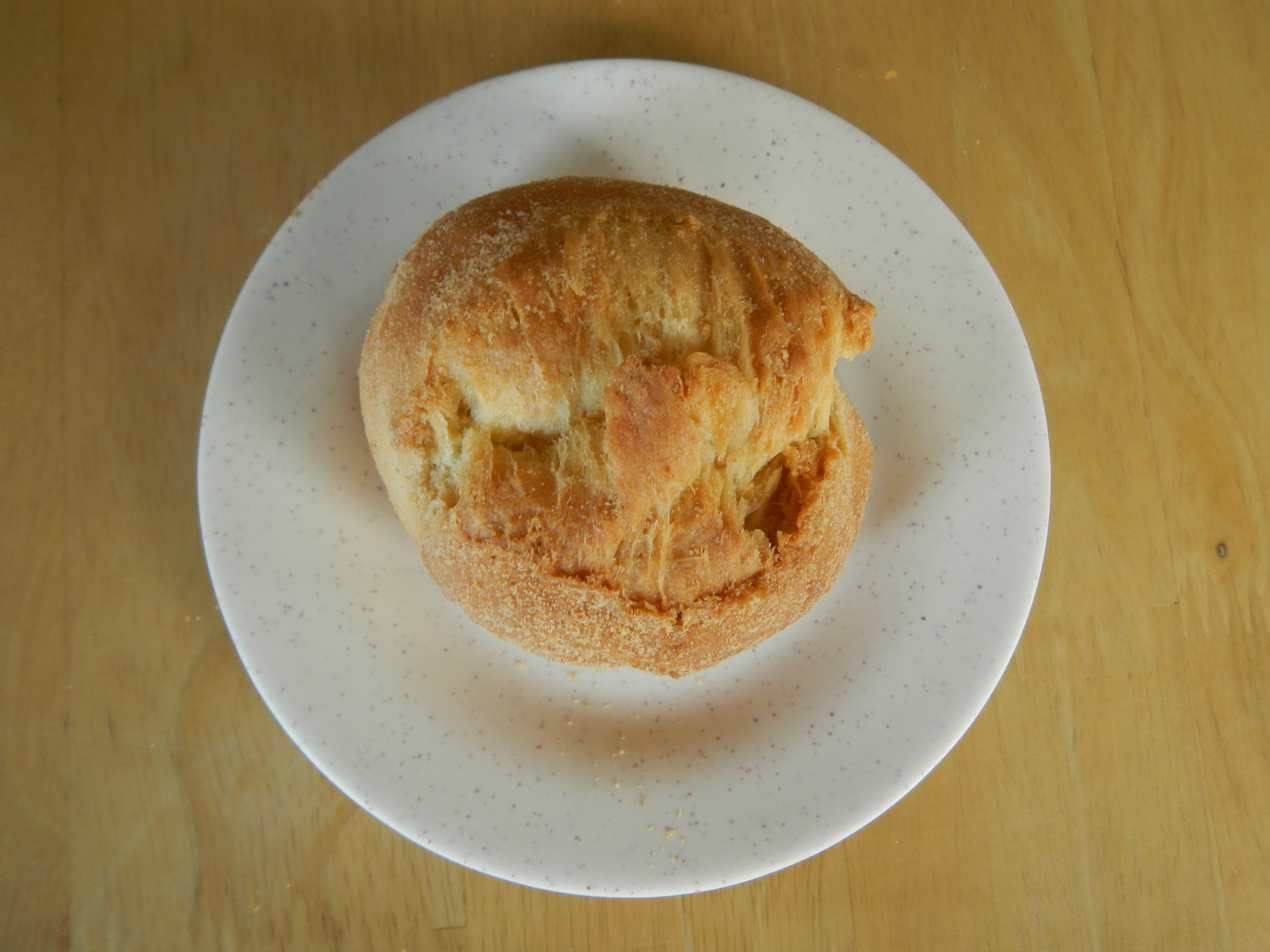
The "putok" is a variation on the pandesal made from monay dough

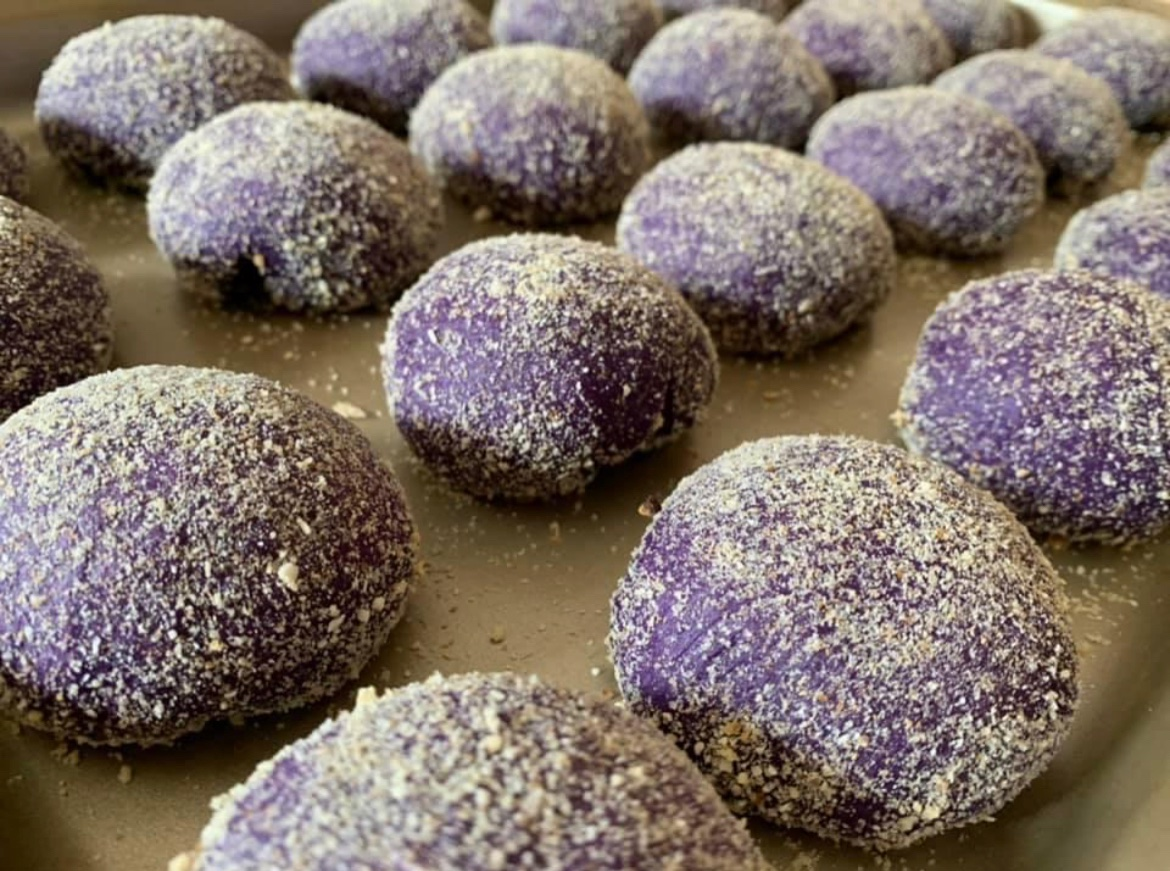
Pandesal with ube

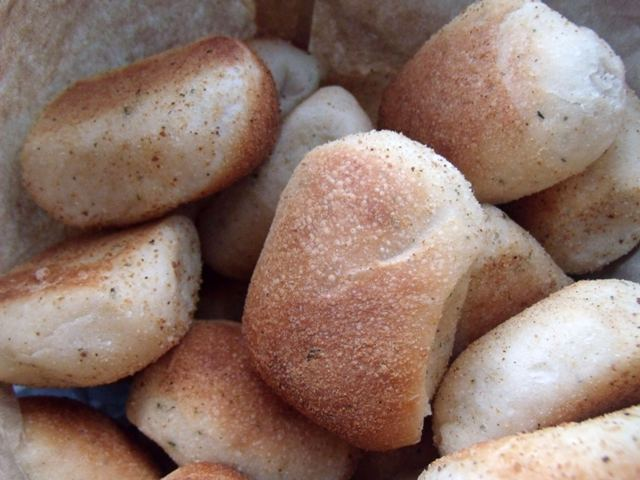
Pandesal with malunggay

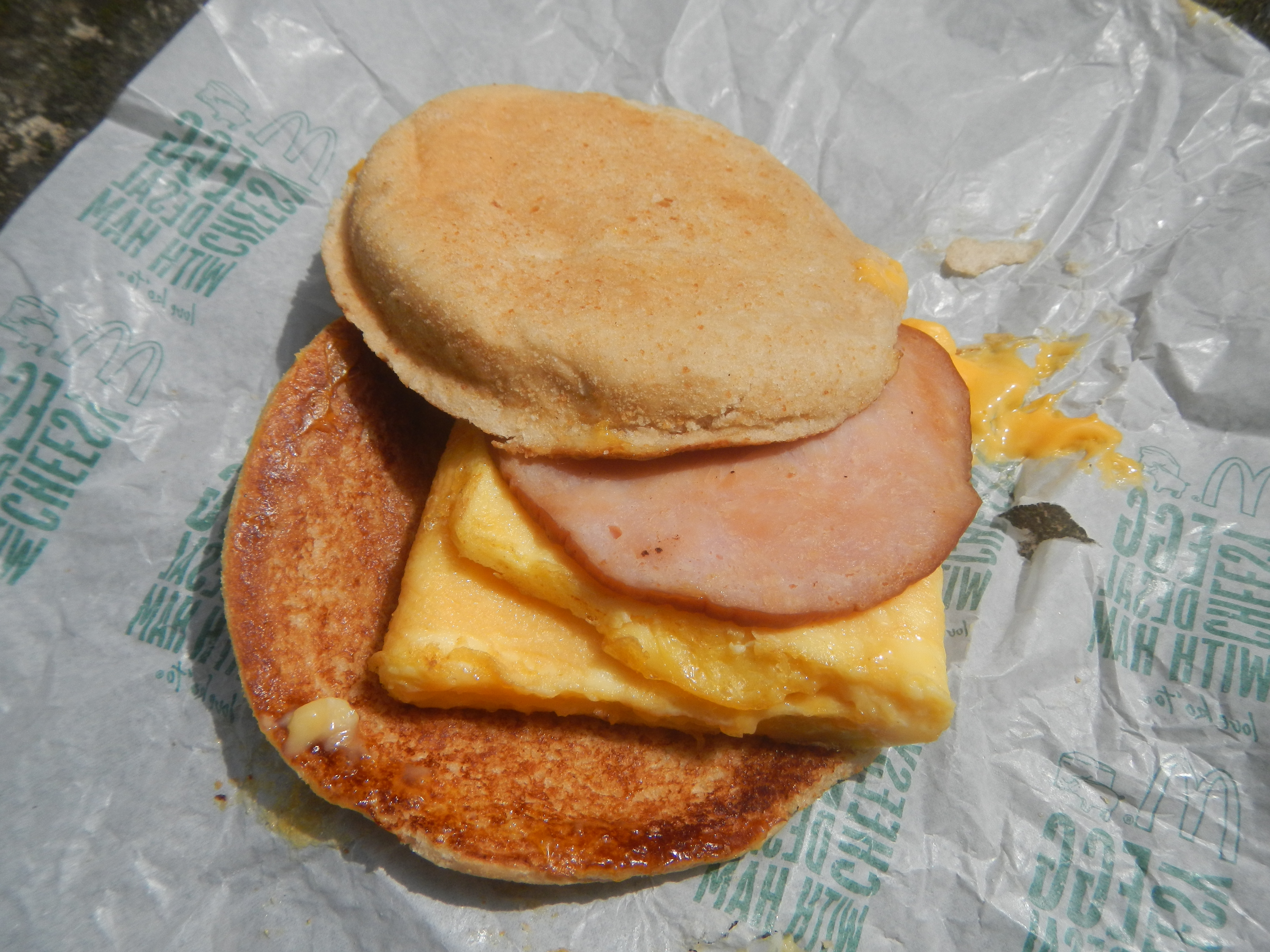
Cheesy Eggdesal with Ham: a Pandesal breakfast sandwich from McDonald's Philippines

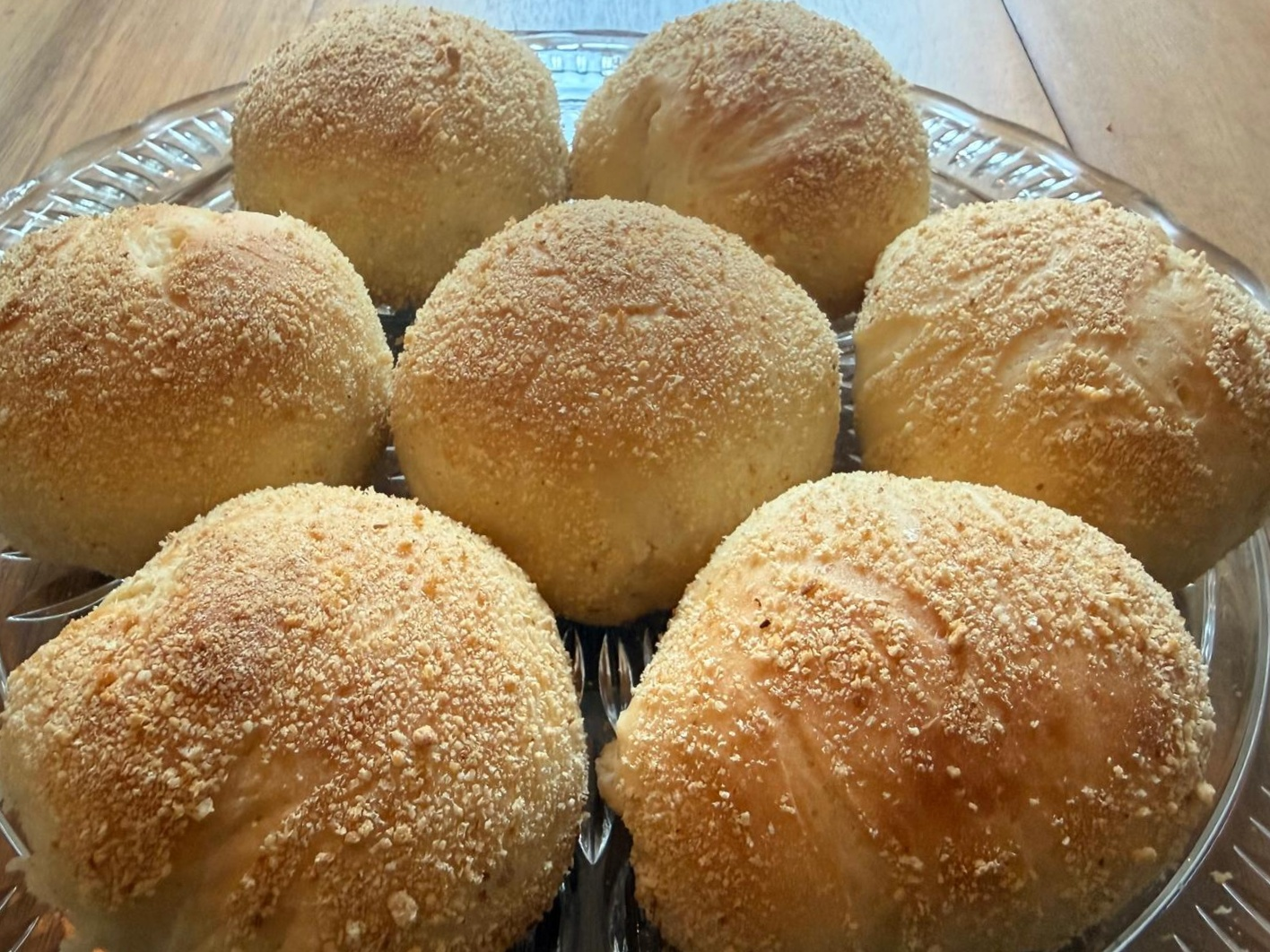
Pandesal fresh and hot from the oven.

== See also ==
- Pan de siosa
- Pan de monja (monáy)
- Pan de coco
- Pan de campo
- French roll
