= Mamie (disambiguation) =

Mamie is a feminine given name and nickname.

Mamie may also refer to:

- Pierre Mamie (1920–2008), Swiss Roman Catholic bishop
- Mamie (film), a 2016 Canadian short animated film
- Typhoon Mamie (disambiguation), a list of Pacific Ocean typhoons and tropical storms
- Mamie Creek (disambiguation), a stream in Iowa

== See also ==
- Mami (disambiguation)
- Mammy (disambiguation)
