= Mamie =

Mamie or Maimie is a feminine given name and nickname (often of Mary) which may refer to:

== Given name ==
- Mamie Claflin (1867–1929), American temperance and suffrage leader
- Mamie Clark (1917–1983), African-American psychologist
- Mamie Eisenhower (1896–1979), wife of President Dwight D. Eisenhower
- Mamie Johnson (1935–2017), first female pitcher in the Negro leagues
- Mamie Locke (born 1954), Democratic member of the Virginia Senate
- Maimie McCoy, English actress
- Mamie Smith (1883–1946), American vaudeville singer, dancer, pianist and actress
- Mamie Thurman (1901–1932), American murder victim
- Mamie Till (1921–2003) African-American educator and civil rights activist, mother of teenage lynching victim Emmett Till
- Mamie Van Doren, American actress and sex symbol born Joan Lucille Olander (born 1931)
- Mamie Jones, pseudonym of American singer Aileen Stanley (1897–1982)

== Nickname ==
- Mamie Cadden (1891–1959), Irish midwife, backstreet abortionist and convicted murderer
- Mary Dickens (1838–1896), daughter of Charles Dickens
- Marion Graves Anthon Fish (1853–1915), American socialite
- Mamie Gummer (born 1983), American actress
- Mamie Lincoln Isham (1869–1938), granddaughter of Abraham Lincoln
- Lady Mary Lygon (1910–1982), British aristocrat and Russian princess by marriage known as Maimie

== Fictional characters ==
- Mamie Dubcek, on the American sitcom 3rd Rock from the Sun
- Maimie Flanagan, in the play The Field by John B. Keane
- Mamie Johnson, on the American soap opera The Young and the Restless
- Maimie Mannering, a love interest of Peter Pan, considered the literary predecessor of Wendy Darling
- the title character of The Revolt of Mamie Stover, a 1951 novel by William Bradford Huie
- Miss Mamie Baldwin, on the 1970s television series The Waltons

== See also ==
- USS Massachusetts, a World War II battleship nicknamed "Big Mamie"
- Mami (disambiguation)
- Mammy (disambiguation)
