= Filipino Chinese cuisine =

Fusion cuisine

Filipino Chinese cuisine is a style of Filipino cuisine influenced by Chinese cuisine historically brought to the Philippines by Chinese Filipinos, starting with the Sangley Chinese and their Chinese mestizo descendants and modern descendants in the Chinese Filipino community of the Philippines. It is characterized as a fusion of Fujian/Hokkien cuisine and Cantonese cuisine adapted over the centuries to Filipino cuisine to suit the general Filipino palate/taste.

== History ==
Filipino cuisine is influenced principally by China and Spain and has been integrated with pre-colonial indigenous Filipino cooking practices.

In the Philippines, trade with China started in the 11th century, as documents show, but undocumented trade may have started as many as two centuries earlier. Trade pottery excavated in Laguna province, for example, includes pieces dating to the Tang dynasty (AD 618–907). Chinese traders supplied the silk sent to Mexico and Spain in the Manila galleon trade. In return, they took back products of field, forest (such as beeswax, rattan) and sea (such as, beche de mer).

Evidence of Chinese influence in Philippine food is easy to find, since the names are an obvious clue. Pansit, noodles flavored with seafood and/or meat and/or vegetables, for example, comes from the Hokkien piān-ê-si̍t (Chinese: 便ê食; Pe̍h-ōe-jī: piān-ê-si̍t or Chinese: 便食; pinyin: biàn shí), meaning something that is conveniently cooked. Modern day pansit, however, is not limited only to noodle dishes that are stir fried or sauteed, but also those shaken in hot water and flavored with a sauce (pansit luglog) or served with broth (mami, lomi). The term includes food that is not noodle shaped, but is of the same flour-water recipe, such as pansit molo (pork filled wontons in a soup).

Early Chinese traders, wishing for the food of their homeland, may have made noodles in their temporary Philippine homes, using ingredients locally available. Further adaptation would occur in the different towns and regions. Thus Malabon, a fishing town in Metro Manila, has developed the pansit Malabon, which features oyster, shrimp and squid. While in Lucban, Quezon, which is deeply inland and far from the sea has pansit Lucban or pansit habhab, which is prepared with some meat and vegetables.

With lumpia, the Chinese eggroll which now has been incorporated into Philippine cuisine, even when it was still called lumpiang Shanghai (indicating frying and a pork filling). Serving meat and/or vegetable in an edible wrapper is a Chinese technique now found in all of Southeast Asia in variations peculiar to each culture. The Filipino version has meat, fish, vegetables, heart of palm and combinations thereof, served fresh or fried or even bare.

The Chinese influence goes deep into Philippine cooking, and way beyond food names and restaurant fare. The use of soy sauce and other soybean products (tokwa, tahuri, miso, tausi, taho) is Chinese, as is the use of such vegetables as petsay (Chinese cabbage), toge (mung bean sprout), mustasa (pickled mustard greens). Many cooking implements still bear their original Chinese name, like sian-se or turner. The Filipino carajay (spelled the Spanish way) is actually the Chinese wok.

The cooking process for Chinese Filipino cuisine also derives from Chinese methods. Pesa is Hokkien for "plain boiled" (Chinese: 白煠; Pe̍h-ōe-jī: pe̍h-sa̍h) and is used only in reference to the cooking of fish, the complete term being peq+sa+hi, the last morpheme meaning fish. In Tagalog, it can mean both fish (pesang dalag) and chicken (pesang manok). As well, foods such as pata tim and pato tim refer to the braising technique (Chinese: 燉 or 燖 or 𤆤; Pe̍h-ōe-jī: tīm) used in Chinese cooking.

Since most of the early Chinese traders and settlers in the country were from the Fujian province, it is Fujian/Hokkien food that is most widespread in influence. However, since restaurant food is often Cantonese, most of the Chinese restaurants in the country would serve both cuisines. Other styles of Chinese cuisine are available though in the minority.

When the Spaniards came, the food influences they brought were from both Spain and Mexico, as it was through the vice-royalty of New Spain that the Philippines were governed. When restaurants were established in the 19th century, Chinese food became a staple of the panciterias (noodle houses), with the food given Spanish names. "Comida China" (the Spanish term for "Chinese food") includes arroz caldo (rice and chicken gruel), and morisqueta tostada (fried rice).

== Examples of Filipino dishes derived from Chinese cuisine ==
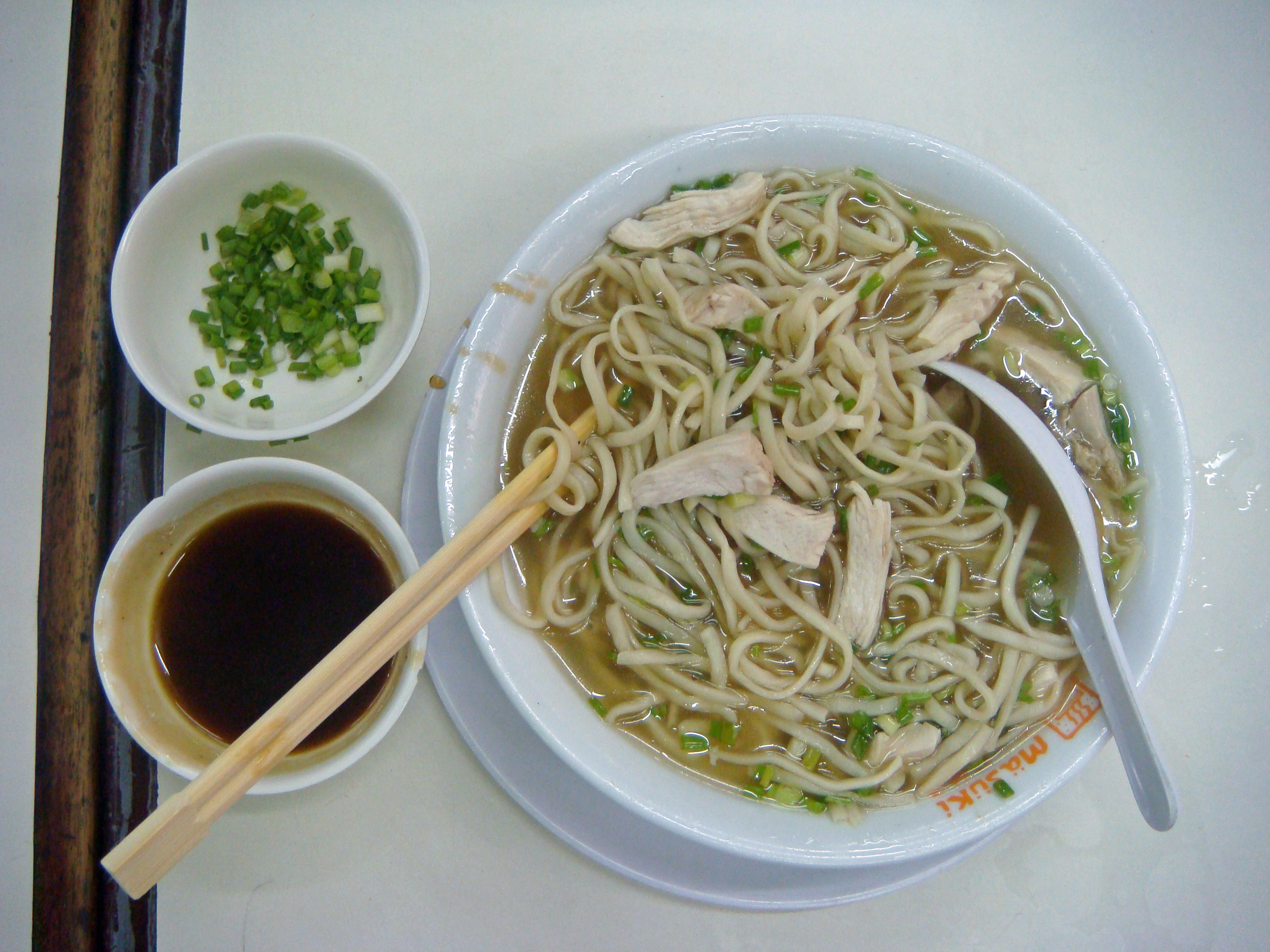
Chicken mami

- Batchoy (Chinese: 肉碎)
- Hopia (Chinese: 好餅)
- Kiampong (Chinese: 鹹飯) – a variant of fried rice.
- Kikiam (Chinese: 雞捲)
- Kwapau (Chinese: 割包) (cuapao)
- Lomi (Chinese: 滷麵)
- Lumpia (Chinese: 潤餅) – a derivative of popiah
- Machang (Chinese: 肉粽) – a derivative of zongzi
- Maki mi (Chinese: 肉羹麵) – pork, beef or fish in a thick cornstarch-based soup
- Mami (Chinese: 肉麵/馬麵) – a noodle soup purportedly invented or popularized by Ma Mon Luk
- Pancit (Chinese: 扁食)
- Siomai (Chinese: 燒賣)
- Siopao (Chinese: 燒包)
- Taho (Chinese: 豆花)
- Goto (Chinese: 牛肚) – rice porridge with ox tripe
- Pork Tito (Chinese: 豬肚)
- Bicho-Bicho (Chinese: 米棗) / Shakoy (Chinese: 油炸粿) – youtiao
- Tikoy (Chinese: 甜粿)
