= Mami =

Mami may refer to:

== People ==
- Cheb Mami (born 1966), Algerian raï singer
- Mami (given name), a Japanese feminine given name
- Mami (goddess), a goddess in the Babylonian epic Atra-Hasis
- Mami Wata, a pantheon of ancient water spirits or deities

== Entertainment ==
- Mámi (1937 film), Hungarian film with Sári Fedák and Piroska Vaszary
- "Mami" (song), a 2018 song by Alexandra Stan
- "Mami", a song by A.B. Quintanilla y Los Kumbia All Starz from the album Ayer Fue Kumbia Kings, Hoy Es Kumbia All Starz, 2006
- "Mami", a song by Peso Pluma from the album Éxodo, 2024
- Mami (rock opera), a 1986 Israeli rock opera
- Mami the Psychic, a Japanese manga series

== Acronyms ==
- MAMI Moscow State Technical University
- MAMI, an abbreviation for Mainz Microtron, an electron accelerator in Germany
- Mumbai Academy of the Moving Image (MAMI), a public trust that organizes the annual international film festival

== Other ==
- Mami, Kerman, a village in Iran
- Mami (hip-hop), a term in hip hop for an attractive Latina woman
- Mami soup, a type of egg noodle soup found in the Philippines
- Mami, the nickname of female WWE wrestler Rhea Ripley

== See also ==
- MAMI (disambiguation)
- Maami, a 2001 Indian Malayalam-language film, starring Shakeela
- Maami, a 2011 film directed by Tunde Kelani
- Mämmi, a traditional Finnish Easter dessert
- Mamiii, a 2022 song by Becky G and Karol G
- Mamie (disambiguation)
- Mammy (disambiguation)
