= Ma Mon Luk =

Restaurateur in the Philippines (1896–1961)

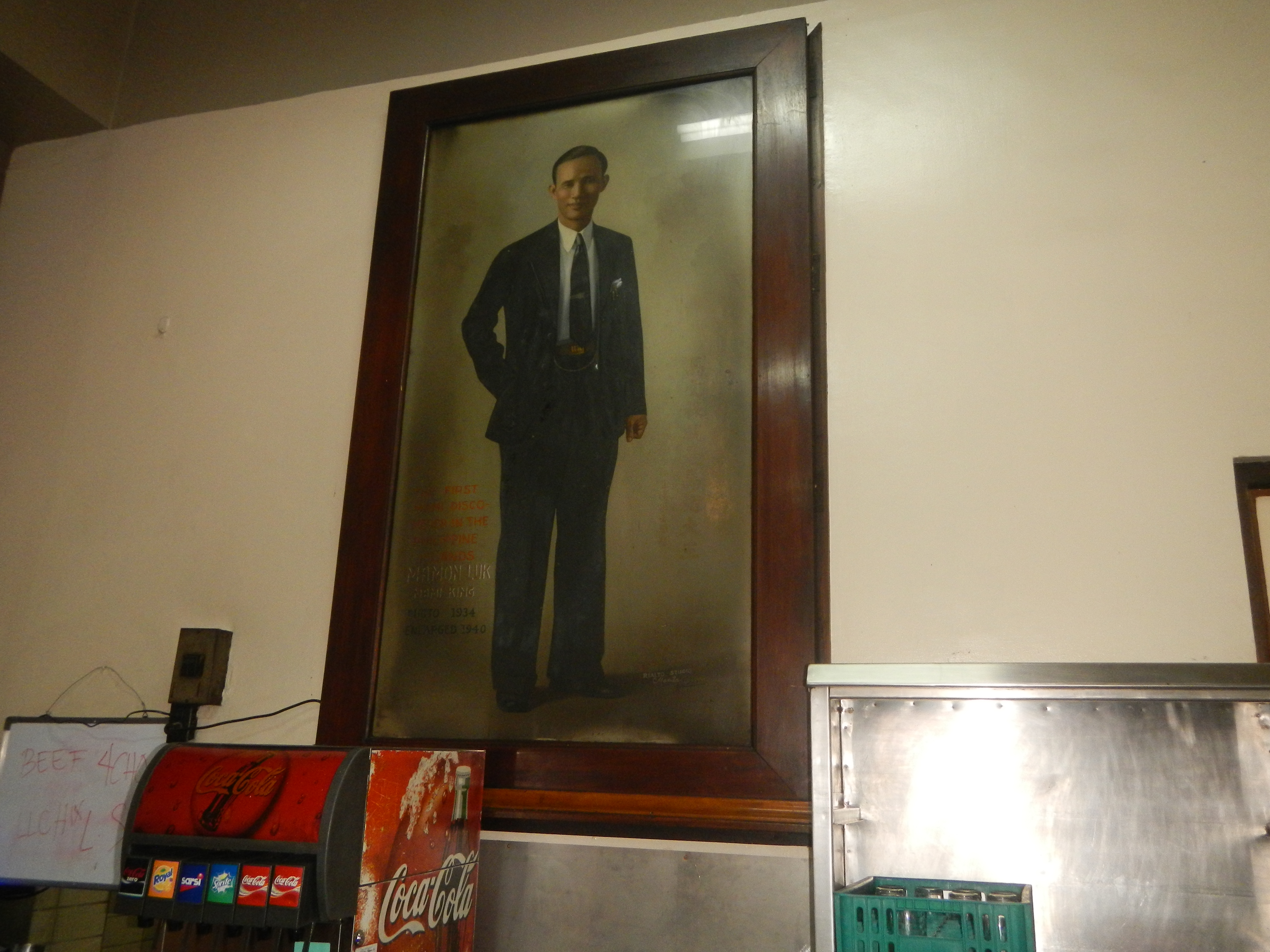
- Standing portrait of Ma Mon Luk at eponymous restaurant in Quezon City
- Born: Máh Màhn-luhk (馬文祿); 1896; Heungsan, Canton, Qing China
- Died: September 1, 1961 (aged 64–65); Pasay, Rizal, Philippines
- Spouse: Ng Shih
- Children: 4

Ma Mon Luk (simplified Chinese: 马文禄; traditional Chinese: 馬文祿 Cantonese Yale: Máh Màhn-luhk), was a Chinese immigrant best known in the Philippines for his eponymous restaurant, and for being the popularizer and alleged creator of mami (a noodle soup) and popularizer of siopao (a steamed bun based on the cha siu bao).

== Early life ==
Ma was born in 1896 in Heungsan, Canton (now Zhongshan, Guangdong) in Qing China. Because of poverty, he was only able to finish junior high school. He self-studied in the Chinese classics to improve himself. He later became a schoolteacher in Canton but earned a lowly salary.

In 1918, Ma left for the Philippines to seek his fortune in order to win the hand of his sweetheart, Ng Shih, whose parents disapproved of him because of his poverty.

== Career ==
Arriving penniless in Binondo, Manila, Ma decided to peddle his own version of chicken noodle soup. He soon became a familiar sight on the streets of Manila, plodding from Puente de España (now Jones Bridge) to as far as Intramuros and Santa Cruz with a long bamboo pole (pingga) slung on his shoulders and two metal containers on each end of the pole, similar to the equipment of taho vendors then and now. One vat contained his especially concocted noodles and strips of chicken meat, while the other vat stored the chicken broth heated underneath by live coals. With a pair of scissors, he would cut the noodles and meat to serve to his customers. He called his concoction "gupit", after the Tagalog word for “cut”. He would finally name the dish “mami". Later, he would add siopao and siomai to his menu.

Ma became known as “Ma Mon Luk” and from a small shop along Tomas Pinpin Street in Binondo, Manila, he would open his first restaurant with the name “Ma Mon Luk Mami King” at the nearby 826-828 Salazar Street. He would promote his restaurant by giving away free samples of siopao. If he ran out of siopao samples, he would give his business card with his signature at the back to signify a free bowl of mami at his restaurant. The restaurant would transfer to Calle Azcárraga (now Recto Avenue) in 1948 and eventually move to 545 Quezon Boulevard in Quiapo, Manila two years later. By the 1950s, Ma and his food were nationally known.

With his success, Ma was able to return to China and seek the hand of his beloved Ng Shih. He would establish his family home and main restaurant at 408 Quezon Avenue in Quezon City, which still exists to date, during the 1950s.

== Death ==
Ma died on September 1, 1961, due to throat cancer and is buried at the Chinese Cemetery in Manila.

== Legacy ==
After Ma's death, his children (all surnamed “Mamonluk”) would continue the restaurant, expanding to as many as six branches in the 1980s. By the end of the 20th century, however, only the original two branches established by Ma would remain. In 2020, the Quiapo branch closed down and the Quezon City branch became the sole restaurant. The restaurant operates under the family-owned Ma Mon Luk International Corporation.

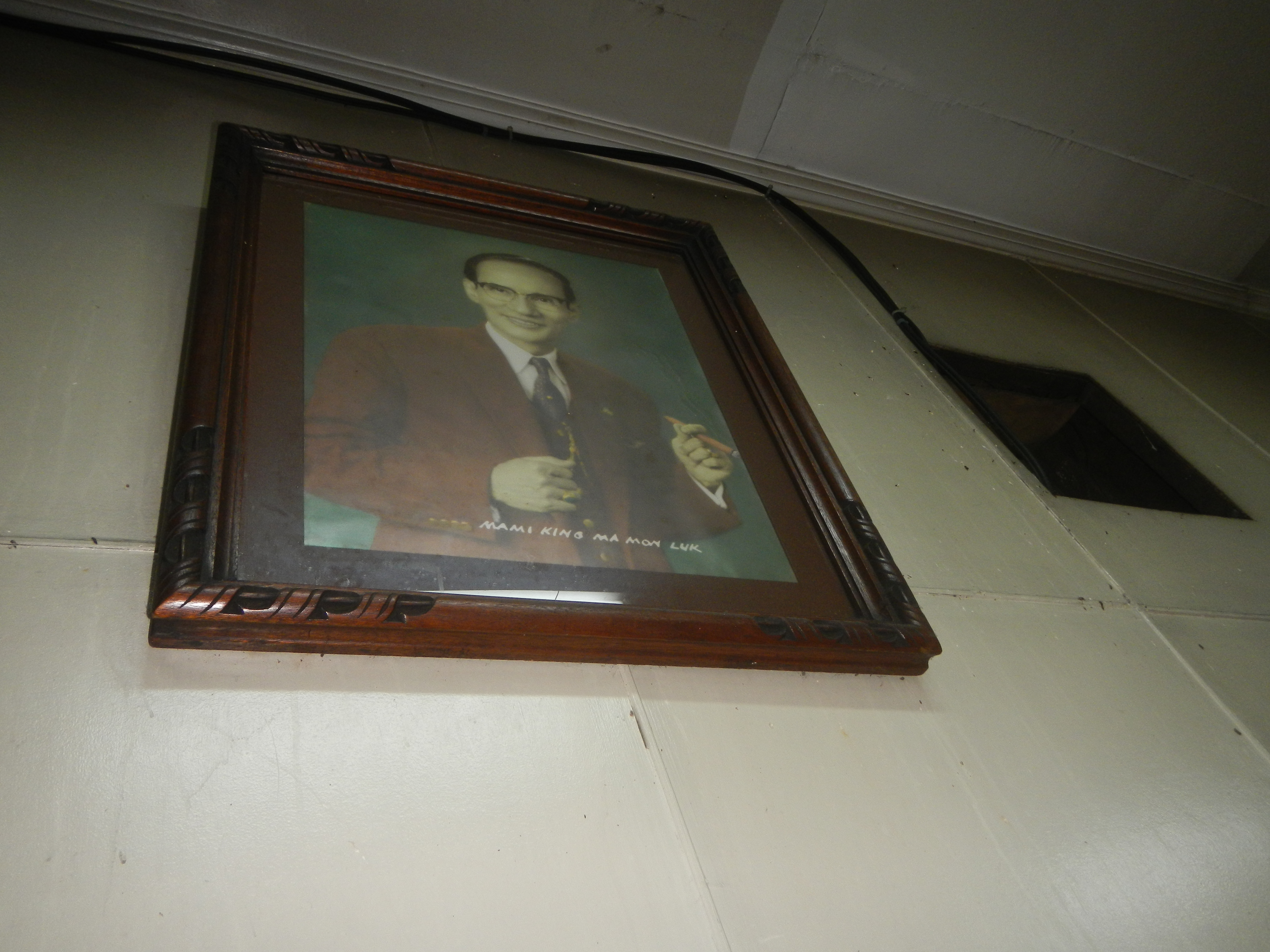
Ma Mon Luk Restaurant portrait

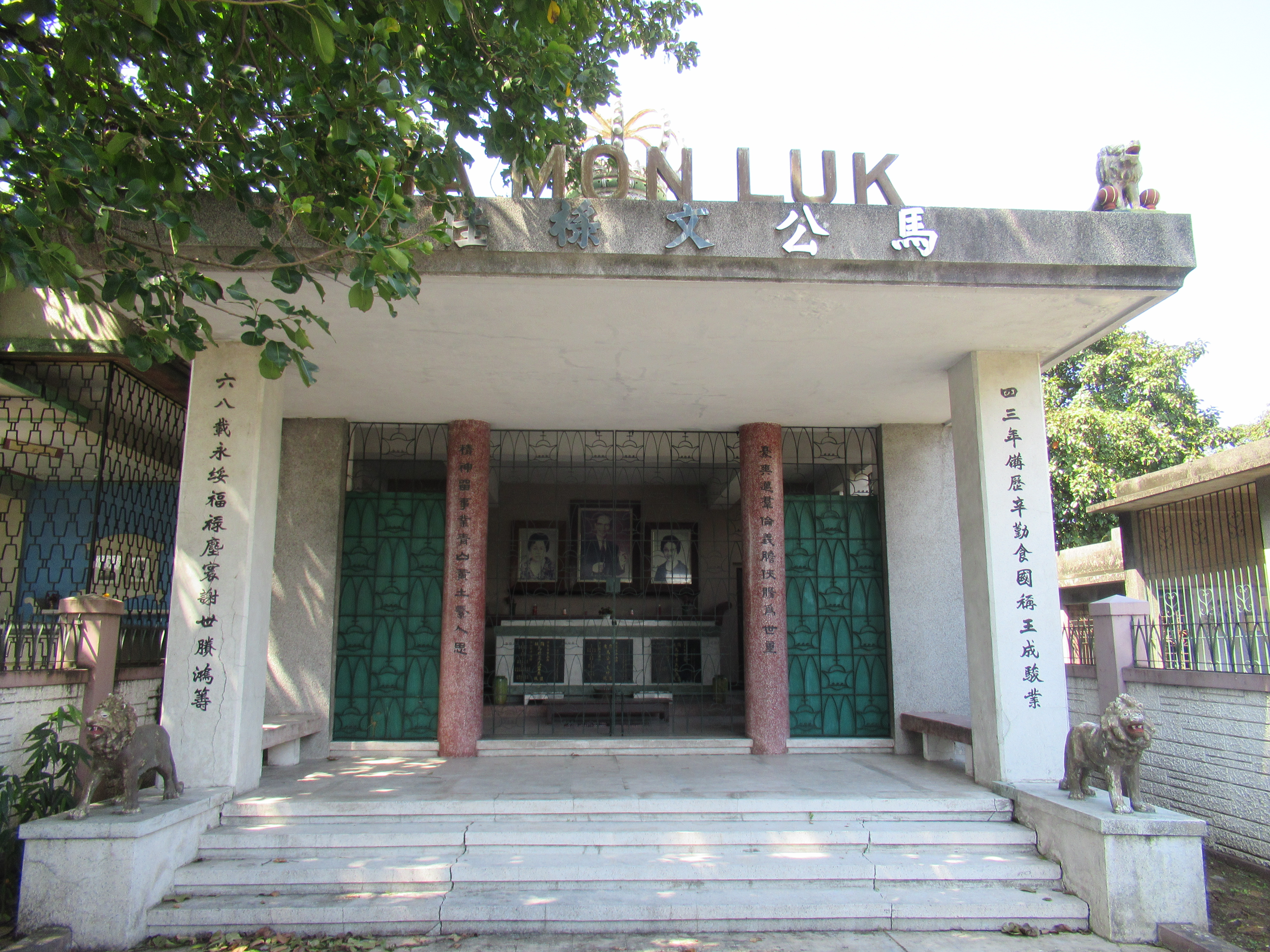
Ma Mon Luk mausoleum

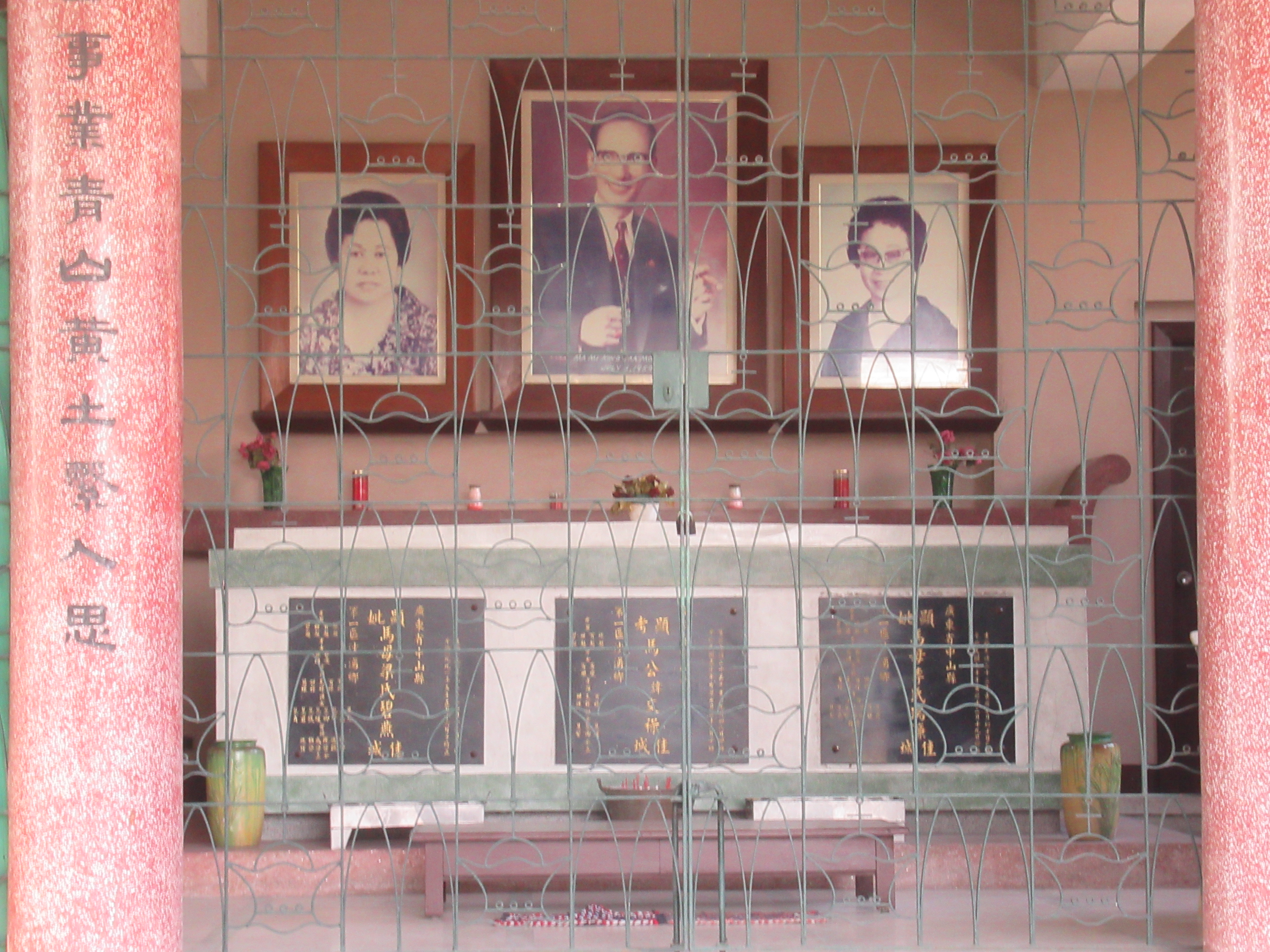
Tombs of Ma Mon Luk and family

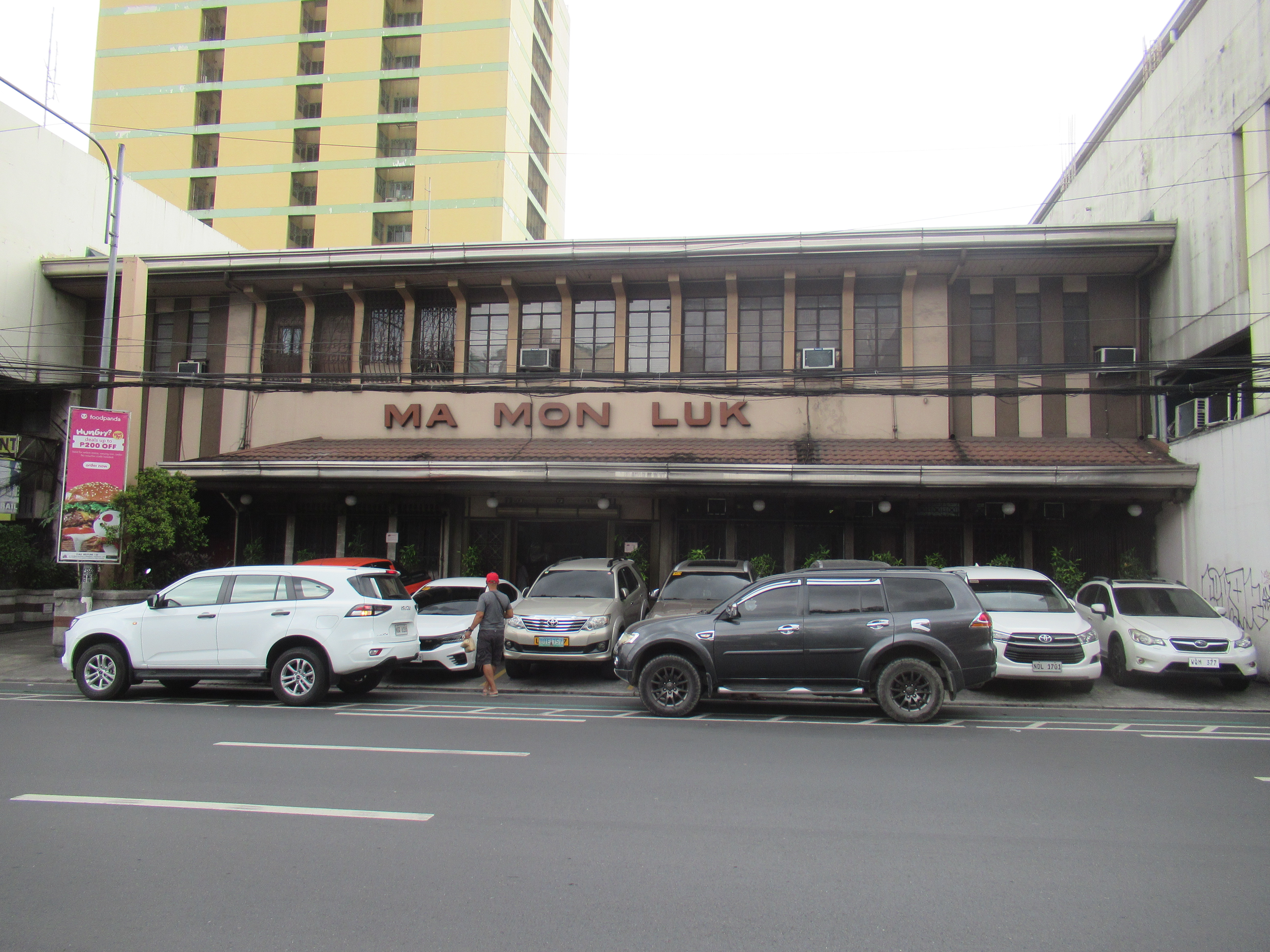
Ma Mon Luk Restaurant, Quezon Avenue

== Mami etymology and origins ==
Ma Mon Luk billed himself as the "Mami King" and maintained that mami was named after himself, i.e. “Ma mi” (simplified Chinese: 马面; traditional Chinese: 馬麵; Cantonese Yale: Máh-mihn; Pe̍h-ōe-jī: Má-mī), literally meaning "Ma’s noodles", so that he was its "inventor". The company maintains this up to the present. Alternately, mami is thought to come from manok (chicken) and miki (a type of egg noodle). This is supported by beef or pork mami sometimes being known as bami, from baboy (pork/pig) or baka (beef/cow). (The Ma Mon Luk restaurants serve both chicken-and-pork mami and beef mami as separate dishes). Regardless, the claim that Ma "invented" mami is likely untrue. According to linguist Gloria Chan-Yap, mami is derived from Philippine Hokkien maq ("meat") and mi ("noodle") and is Fujianese in origin, not Cantonese. Like the siopao, the noodle dish already existed in Filipino-Chinese cuisine before Ma popularized his version.
