= Vendors Partylist =

Filipino political organization

Vendors
- — Philippine partylist —
- Full name: Vendors Samahan ng mga Maninindang Pilipino
- Chairperson: Florencio Pesigan
- Sector(s) represented: Informal (vendors)
- Colors: Green

Website
- vendorspartylist.com

The Vendors Samahan ng mga Maninindang Pilipino (lit. 'Association of Filipino vendors') also known as the Vendors Partylist is an organization which sought partylist representation in the House of Representatives of the Philippines in the 2025 election. It aims to represent the interest of vendors and workers in the informal sector.

== Background ==
In October 2024, Vendors Partylist filed their candidacy for the 2025 House of Representatives elections headlined by social media personality, pares vendor, and fourth nominee Diwata. The first to third nominees are Marilou Lipana, Florencio Pesigan and Sheryl Sandi.

== Disqualification case ==
Election watchdog Kontra Daya filed a disqualification case against Vendors Partylist noting how the organization's first three nominees are owners of big firms and do not belong to the sector they represent. Lipana was noted to be president of Olympus Mining and Builders Group Philippines Corporation, Pesigan an owner of an advertising agency, and Sendil as an owner of a hardware and construction supplies business. A maximum of three nominees by group can be seated under the partylist system.

Diwata called the move "unfair" and said that his organization is being singled-out by Kontra Daya. Vendors itself released a statement calling the petition "baseless and malicious" stating that nominees can also be people who have "a clear track record of their advocacy of the sectoral group they are representing".

== Electoral history ==
=== Electoral performance ===
Election	Votes	%	Secured seats	Party-list seats	Congress	Ref.
2025	88,845	0.21%	0 / 3	63	20th Congress; 2025–2028	
Note: A party-list group, can win a maximum of three seats in the House of Representatives.

=== Nominees ===
Election	Nominee	Position	Status	Ref.
2025	Marilou Lipana	1st nominee	No seats won	
2025	Florencio Pesigan	2nd nominee	No seats won	
2025	Sheryl Sandil	3rd nominee	No seats won	
2025	Deo Jarito "Diwata" Balbuena	4th nominee	No seats won	
2025	Emilyn Garcia	5th nominee	No seats won	
2025	Liza Nicdao	6th nominee	No seats won	
2025	Michelle Ann Pusing	7th nominee	No seats won	
2025	Ronaldo Carlos	8th nominee	No seats won	
2025	Romulo Diaz Jr.	9th nominee	No seats won	
2025	Sonia Almosa	10th nominee	No seats won	
