= Diwata (entrepreneur) =

Filipino entrepreneur and internet personality (born 1982)

- Born: Deo Jarito Balbuena; August 31, 1982 (age 44); Northern Samar, Philippines
- Education: Don Juan F. Avalon National High School
- Occupations: Businessman, actor, content creator
- Known for: Owner of Diwata Pares Overload and Diwata Salon and Barbershop; Fourth nominee of Vendors Party-list for the 2025 election

Deo Jarito Balbuena (born August 31, 1982), also known as Diwata, is a Filipino internet personality, food vlogger, entrepreneur, and advocate within the LGBTQ+ community. Best known for his business Diwata Pares Overload, Balbuena was also one of the nominees of Vendors Partylist (Vendors Samahan ng mga Maninindang Pilipino) for the 2025 Philippine House of Representatives elections.

== Biography ==
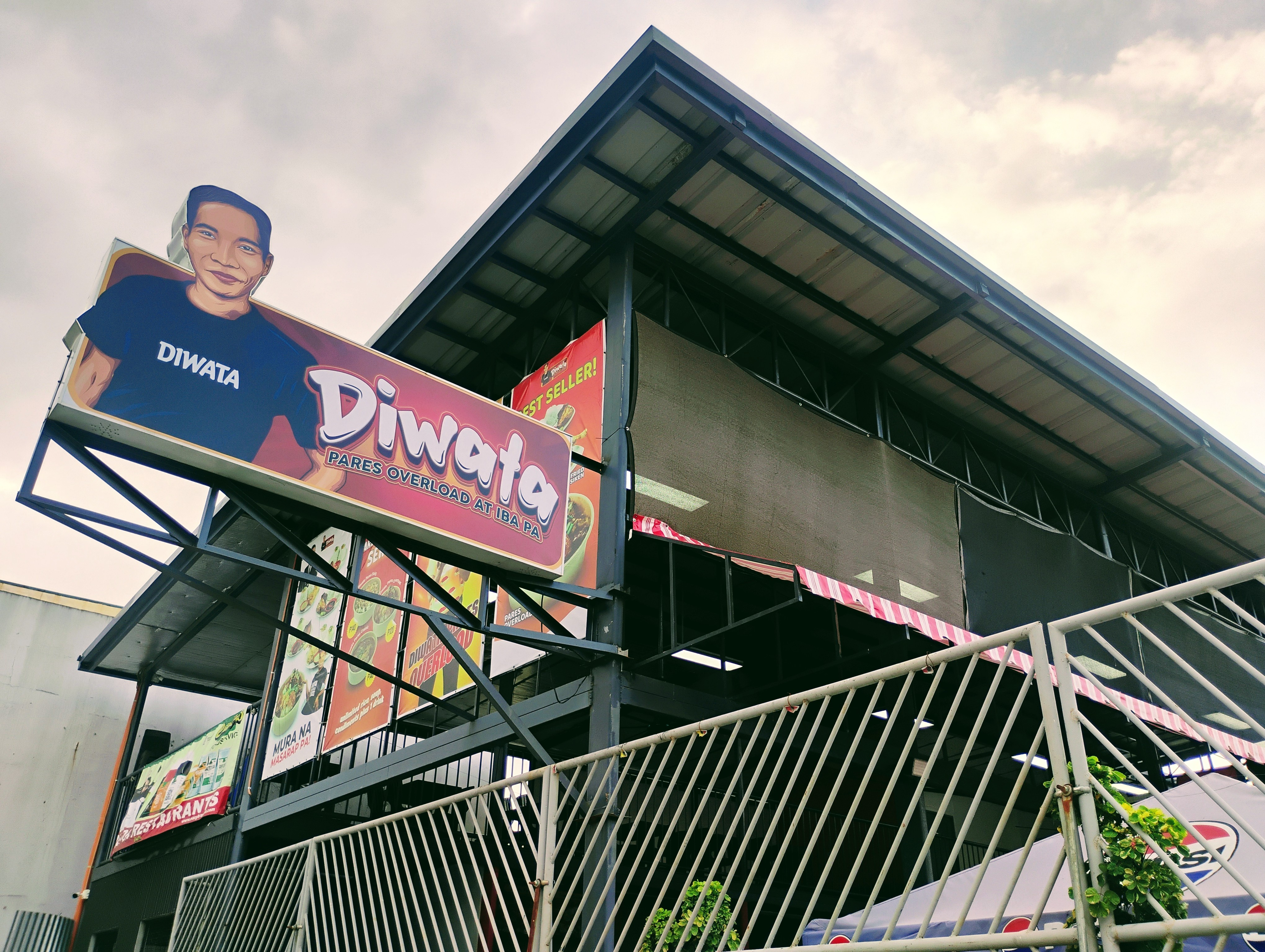
A branch of Diwata's restaurant business, Diwata Pares, in Caloocan

Balbuena was born on August 31, 1982, in Northern Samar, finishing secondary education at Don Juan F. Avalon National High School in San Roque, Northern Samar. At the age of 17, Balbuena moved to Metro Manila, where he found work as a beautician. Diwata later diversified into trading, selling coffee, cigarettes, and candies, alongside construction work to supplement income. Diwata's pares business gained attention on social media for its perceived value, offering a meal of unlimited rice, soup, and a soft drink for ₱100. In 2026, he opened up Diwata Salon and Barbershop in Trece Martires, Cavite.

Before becoming a food vendor, Diwata was a contestant on the "Miss Q and A" segment of the Philippine television program It's Showtime in 2019.

In April 2024, he became a cast member of Batang Quiapo.

Diwata ran in the 2025 Philippine House of Representatives elections as fourth nominee for the Vendors Partylist, an organization seeking party-list representation. However, the party-list failed to secure a seat.

== Controversies ==
In 2016, Balbuena first went viral for his strut at a police station in Pasay after being involved in an incident where he reported two acquaintances using illegal drugs beneath the J.W. Diokno Bridge. The complaint escalated into a physical altercation, during which Balbuena was wounded on his forehead and arm with a cutter by the person he had reported.

On April 16, 2024, Balbuena was arrested in connection with a slight physical injury case filed against him in 2018. He was released the same day after posting bail of ₱3,000.

On February 28, 2025, Diwata apologized after pictures of him wearing indigenous costumes were criticized along with inappropriate gestures against indigenous peoples in the Cordillera Administrative Region during the Panagbenga Festival in Baguio by the National Commission on Indigenous Peoples, which called it cultural appropriation.

In February 2026, Diwata was arrested over “non-compliance” of his Diwata Pares eatery. He was released 24 hours later after posting bail of ₱60,000.

== Awards ==
In May 2024, Balbuena was awarded 'Most Sensational Media Personality of the Year' at the Gawad Dangal Filipino Awards 2024 and 'Social Media Influencer of the Year' at the Asia's Golden Icon Awards.

== Filmography ==
Television
Year	Title	Role	Reference
2024	Batang Quiapo	Frida	
