= Mammy =

Mammy may refer to:

- Mammy stereotype, a stock portrayal of a black woman who cared for or served people in a white family
- Irish mammy, cultural stereotype used in Ireland to describe Irish mothers of a traditionally matriarchal style
- Mammy (1930 film), starring Al Jolson
- Mammy (1951 film), a French drama film
- Mammy (Gone with the Wind), a character in Gone with the Wind
- Mammy Two Shoes, a recurring character in MGM's Tom and Jerry cartoons
- Mammy yokum, a white hillbilly from the comic strip Li'l Abner

== See also ==
- "My Mammy", a U.S. popular song, notably recorded by Al Jolson
- Maami, a 2011 film directed by Tunde Kelani
- Mama and papa
- Mamy (disambiguation)
- Mami (disambiguation)
- Mamie (disambiguation)
- Mummy (disambiguation)
- Mommy (disambiguation)
