= Mamie Creek =

Mamie Creek may refer to:

- Mamie Creek (South Fork Flathead River tributary), a stream in Iowa
- Mamie Creek (Iowa), a stream in Montana
