= Douhua =

Chinese dessert made with tender tofu

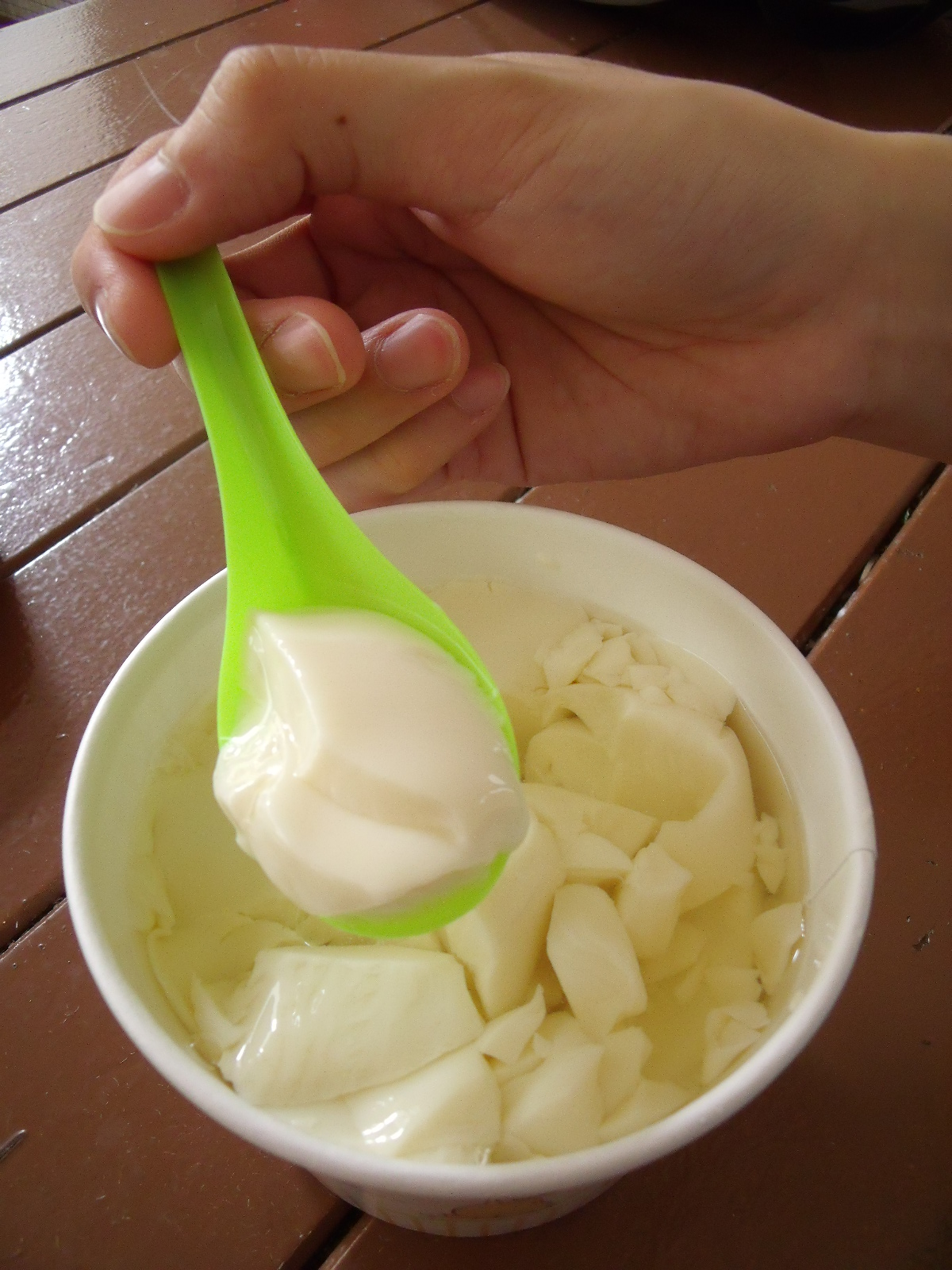
- Douhua in sugar syrup
- Alternative names: Doufuhua, doufunao, laodoufu, tofu pudding, soybean pudding
- Type: Snack
- Place of origin: China
- Region or state: East Asia and Southeast Asia
- Main ingredients: Tofu

tofu pudding
- Chinese: 豆腐花
- Literal meaning: bean curd flower
Transcriptions
Standard Mandarin
- Hanyu Pinyin: dòufuhuā
Wu
- Romanization: deu vu ho [dɤ²² vu⁵⁵ ho]
- Suzhounese: [døy²² vu³³ ho]
Yue: Cantonese
- Yale Romanization: dauh fuh fā
- Jyutping: dau6 fu6 faa1
Southern Min
- Hokkien POJ: tāu-hū-hoe

Alternative Chinese name
- Traditional Chinese: 豆花
- Simplified Chinese: 豆花
Transcriptions
Standard Mandarin
- Hanyu Pinyin: dòuhūa
Southern Min
- Hokkien POJ: tāu-hoe
- Tâi-lô: tāu-hue

Second alternative Chinese name
- Traditional Chinese: 豆腐腦
- Simplified Chinese: 豆腐脑
Transcriptions
Standard Mandarin
- Hanyu Pinyin: dòufunǎo
Southern Min
- Hokkien POJ: tāu-hū-náu

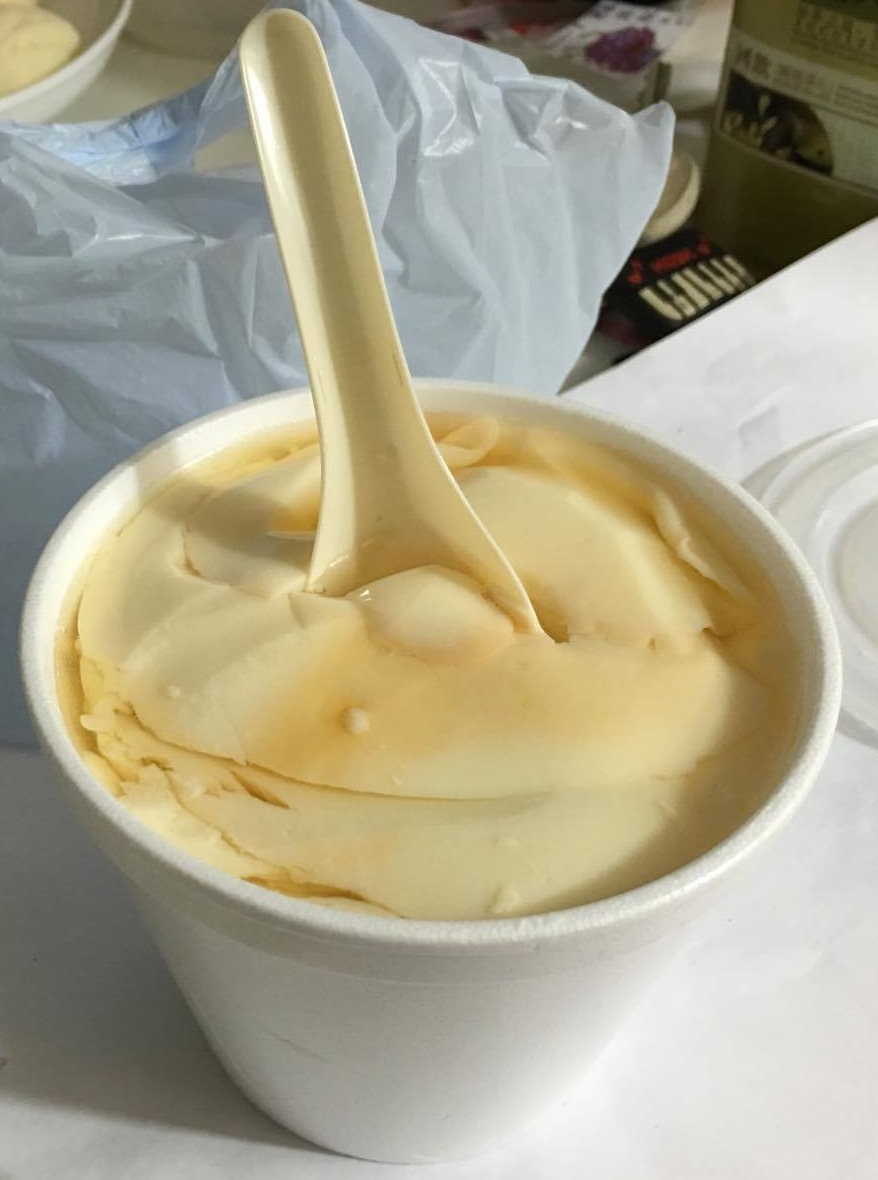
Soy curd with sugar syrup sold in Kwai Chung, Hong Kong

Douhua (Note: Chinese: 豆花; pinyin: dòuhuā; Pe̍h-ōe-jī: tāu-hoe) is a Chinese sweet or savoury snack made with silken tofu. It is also referred to as doufuhua or tau foo fah, (Note: Chinese: 豆腐花; pinyin: dòufuhuā; Jyutping: dau6 fu6 faa1) doufunao (Note: Chinese: 豆腐脑; pinyin: dòufunǎo; "tofu brains") in northern China, tofu pudding, and soybean pudding.

== History ==
The earliest records of douhua date from the Han dynasty; it was called 豆腐脑 dòufunǎo, or "tofu brains", because of its softness. In the next 2000 years, it gradually spread throughout China. Ming dynasty scholars credited Han Prince Liu An with inventing tofu and douhua as foods soft enough for his ailing mother to eat.

During the Second Sino-Japanese War, Sichuan became the political, economical, and military center of Free China. The boss of a famous Douhua restaurant, Liu Xilu, learnt the methods of making beancurd from others and innovated on them until he finally came up with his own "secret recipe", which greatly improved its taste.

== Names ==
Douhua	豆花	Taiwan, Sichuan, Yunnan, Guizhou, Hunan, Jiangxi, Fujian, Singapore; in northern China, douhua refers exclusively to sweet variants	In Fujian, brown sugar is added to sweet Douhua, while salted Douhua is flavored with dried radish, fried garlic, cilantro, dried shrimps, etc. In Taiwan, beans such as mung bean, red beans, and peeled peanuts are usually added, as well as soy milk, fruit, or taro balls.
Doufuhua	豆腐花	Southern China, Hong Kong, Macau, Malaysia, Singapore	In Hong Kong and Macau, brown sugar, sweet-scented osmanthus syrup, and ginger juice are usually added to Douhua. Chili oil or powder is normally added to it in southwest China.
Doufunao	豆腐脑	North China, Hubei, Anhui, Jiangsu, Henan, Shanghai, Zhejiang	Northern doufunao (lit. "tofu brains") are often seasoned with "salted stew", and Henan people usually eat it with local snacks. Tofu brains in Jiangsu, Zhejiang, and Shanghai are generally salty tofu brains like the northern ones. People in Hubei and Anhui also call it as tofu brain, but tofu brain in Hubei is generally added with white sugar, which is the sweet version.
Laodoufu	老豆腐	Tianjin	In Tianjin cuisine, Northern-style savoury "tofu brain" is a common breakfast item known as laodoufu (old tofu).
Doufusheng	豆腐生	Taizhou, Zhejiang	Sweet Douhua there is topped with syrup and some sweet-scented osmanthus; the salty one is topped with mustard tuber, seaweed, spring onion, etc.
Nendoufu	嫩豆腐	Hubei	In Hubei, people call spicy Douhua "silk tofu".

== Regional variants ==
Variants of douhua can be broadly divided into three groups: savoury (鹹), spicy (辣), and sweet (甜). Traditionally, sweet douhua was mainly distributed in South China and Hong Kong, and was introduced to Taiwan and Southeast Asia; salty douhua was mainly distributed in northern China, and spicy douhua was mainly distributed in southwest China.

=== Savoury ===
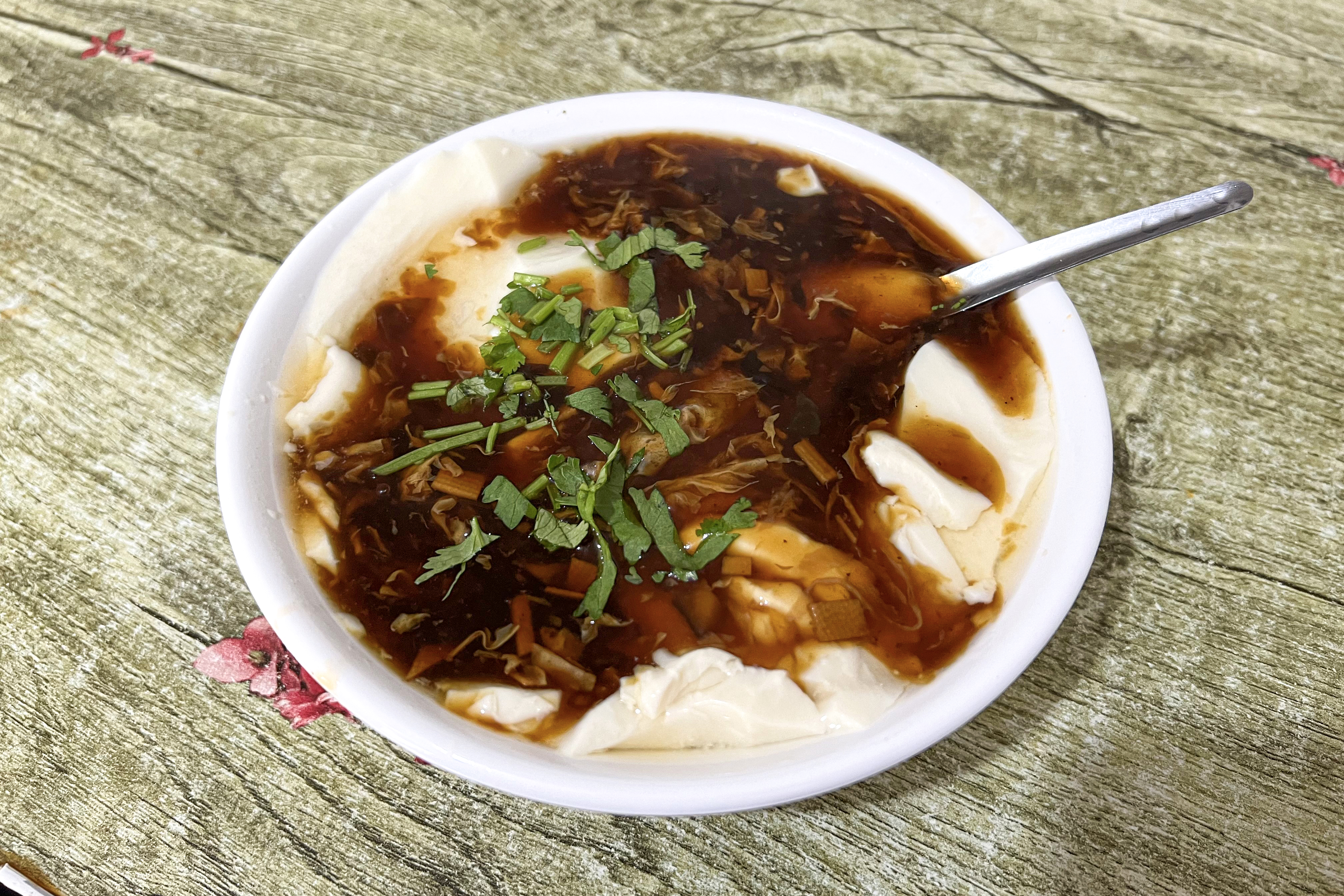
Beijing style salty doufunao

In Northern China, Douhua is often eaten with soy sauce, resulting in a savoury flavor. Each region may differ in seasonings. Inland cities add chopped meat, pickles or zha cai, and mushrooms, while coastal cities add seaweed and small shrimp. Tofu brains can be found at breakfast stands along the streets in the morning, usually with eggs or youtiao (fried dough sticks).

=== Spicy ===
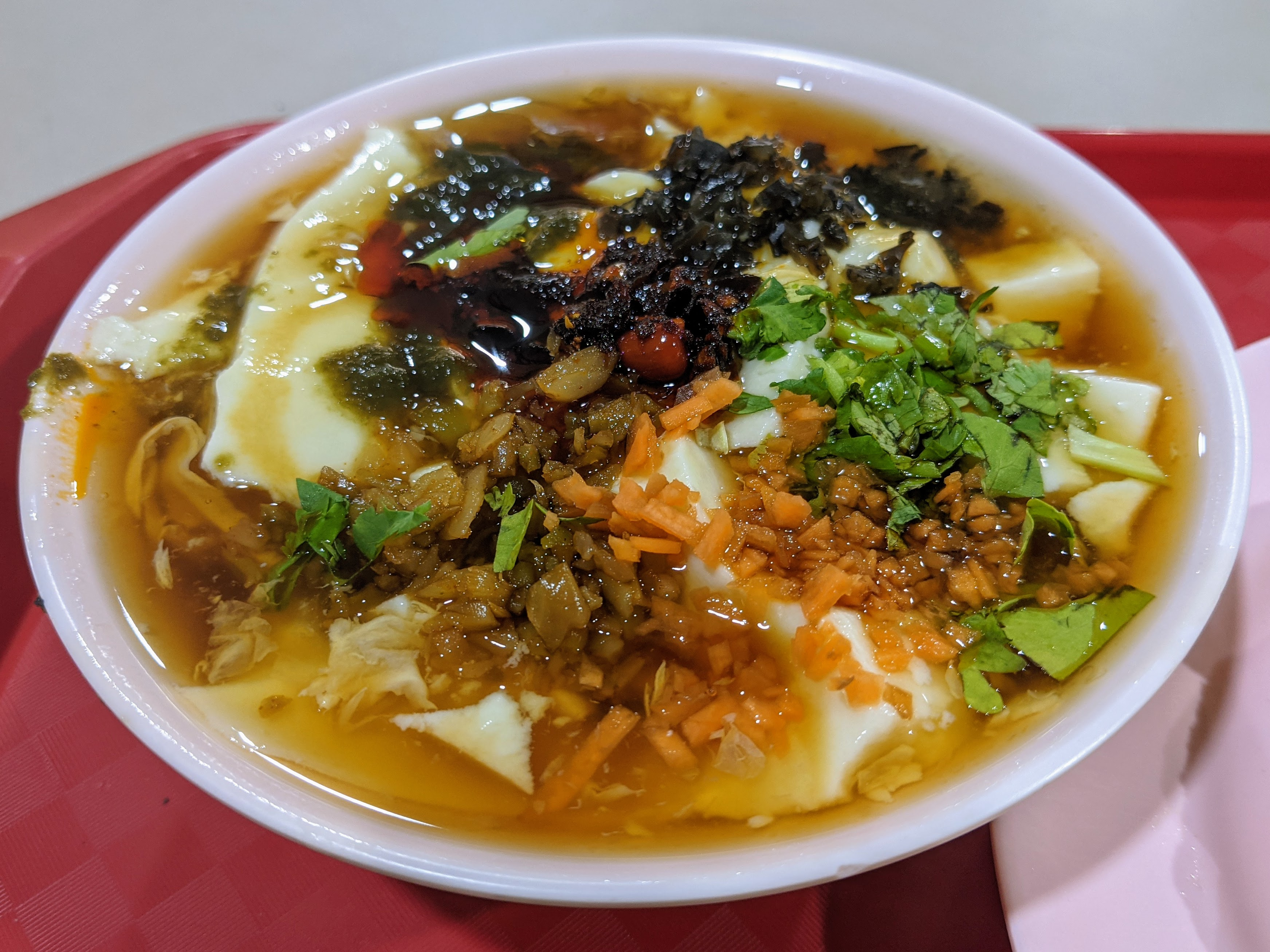
Sichuan style spicy doufunao

In Sichuan and neighboring Shaanxi, doufunao is often flavored with chilli oil and Sichuan peppers to make it spicy. It is served by carrying pole or bicycle vendors with several condiments such as chili oil, soy sauce, scallions, and nuts.

=== Sweet ===
In Hubei, Hunan and Jiangxi, sugar is added directly to the tofu curd without adding any other condiments. This way of eating best retains the original flavor of tofu curd (bean curd).

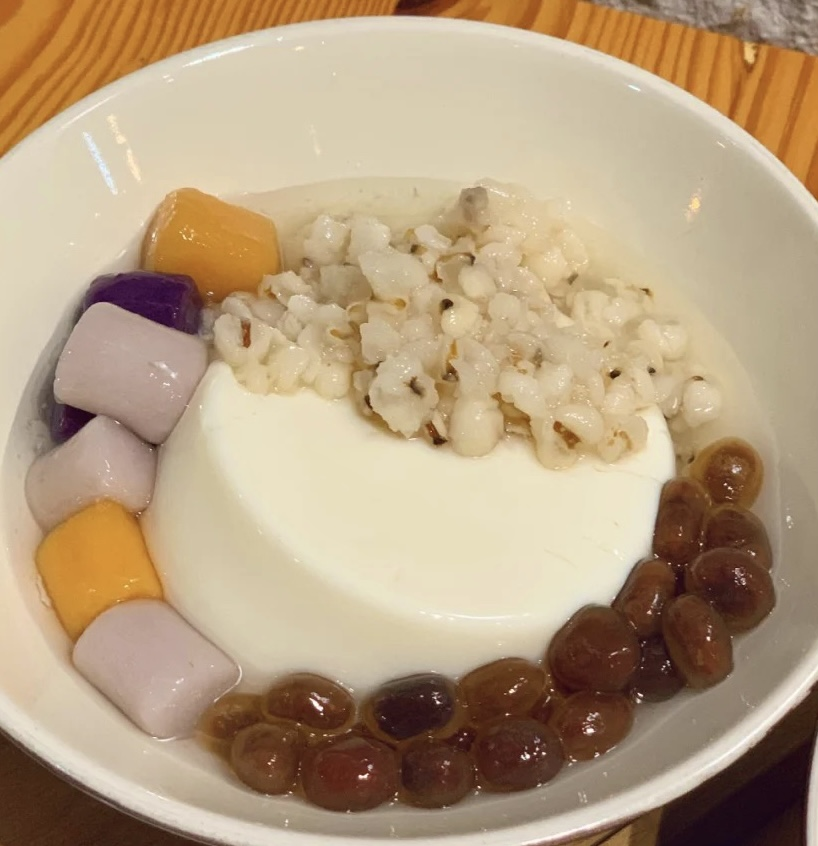
Sweet douhua sold in dessert shop

In southern China, Douhua is often eaten with sweet flavoring. Southern China often refers to Douhua as tofu pudding. It is served with sweet ginger or clear syrup. In summer, people eat cold Douhua to relieve themselves of the heat. In winter, people add hot sweet water and beans into Douhua to dispel cold. Hong Kong people add sesame paste into Douhua.

Taiwanese and Cantonese douhua are a symbol of southern Chinese cuisine, and often served as a part of yum cha. Known as tofu fa, it can also be found sold in small stores on the side of popular hiking trails and beaches in Hong Kong.

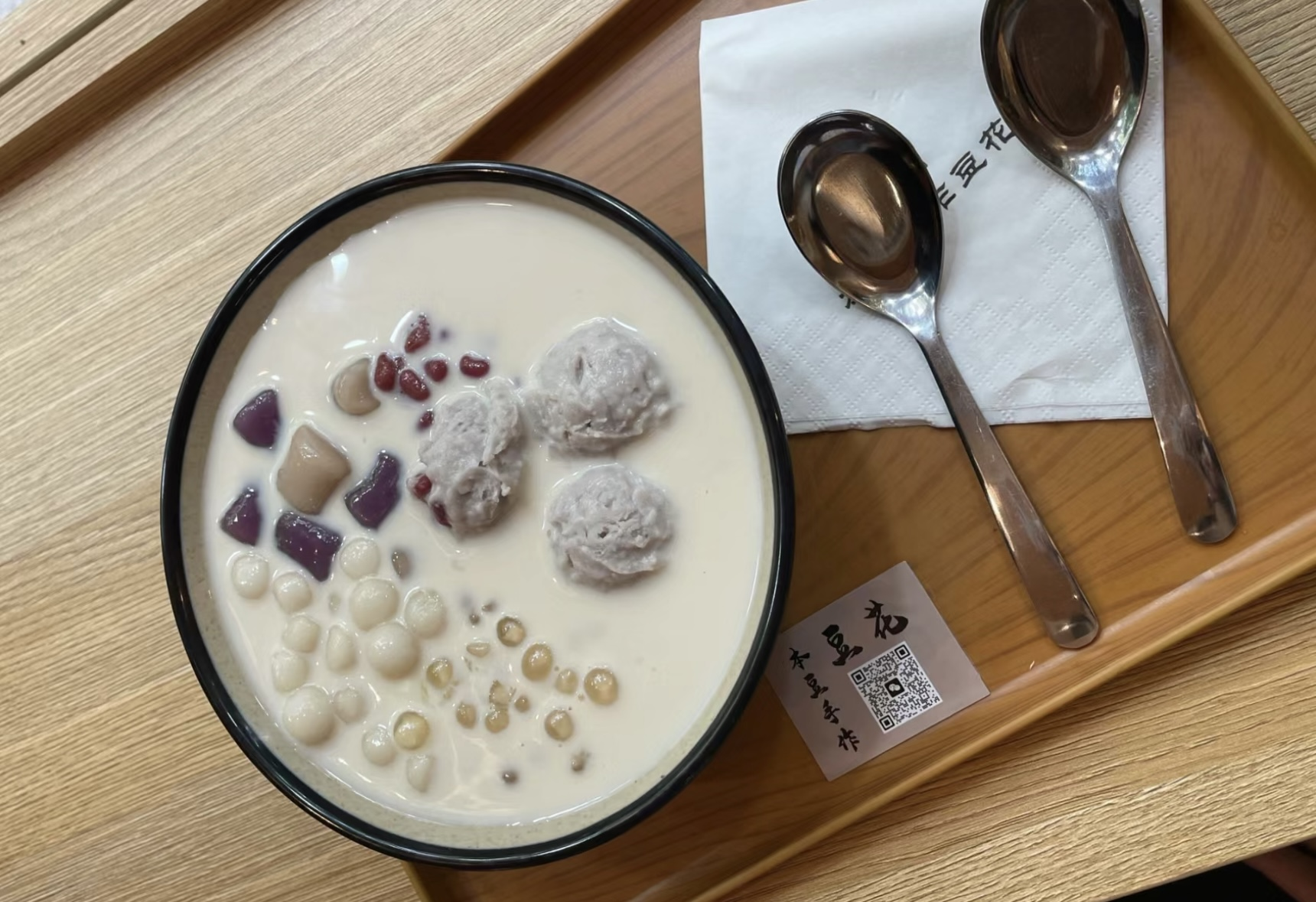
There are special bean curd dessert shops in the south. This bean curd contains: bean curd, milk, pearls, taro paste, and taro balls.

In Southeast Asia, douhua is almost always sweet, although condiments vary widely.

==== Filipino cuisine ====
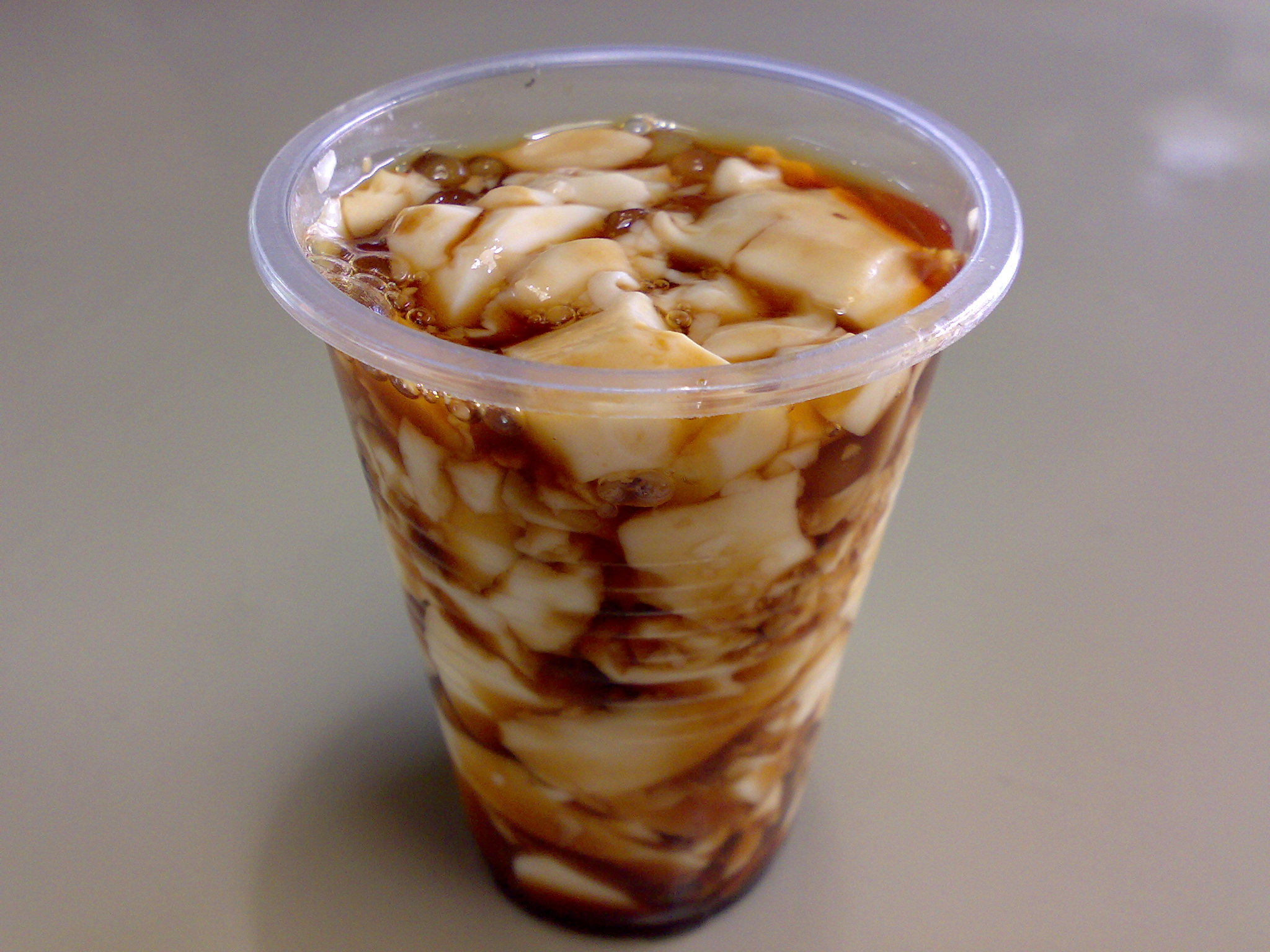
Taho, the Philippine version of douhua, served in a small plastic cup

In the Philippines, it is more commonly known as taho. It is a fresh silken tofu served in sweet brown syrup and sago pearls. It is usually peddled by hawkers in the mornings, by door-to-door or in public plazas, or outside churches. In some regional variations, taho is often served with sugarcane syrup, ube syrup or strawberry syrup.

==== Indonesian cuisine ====
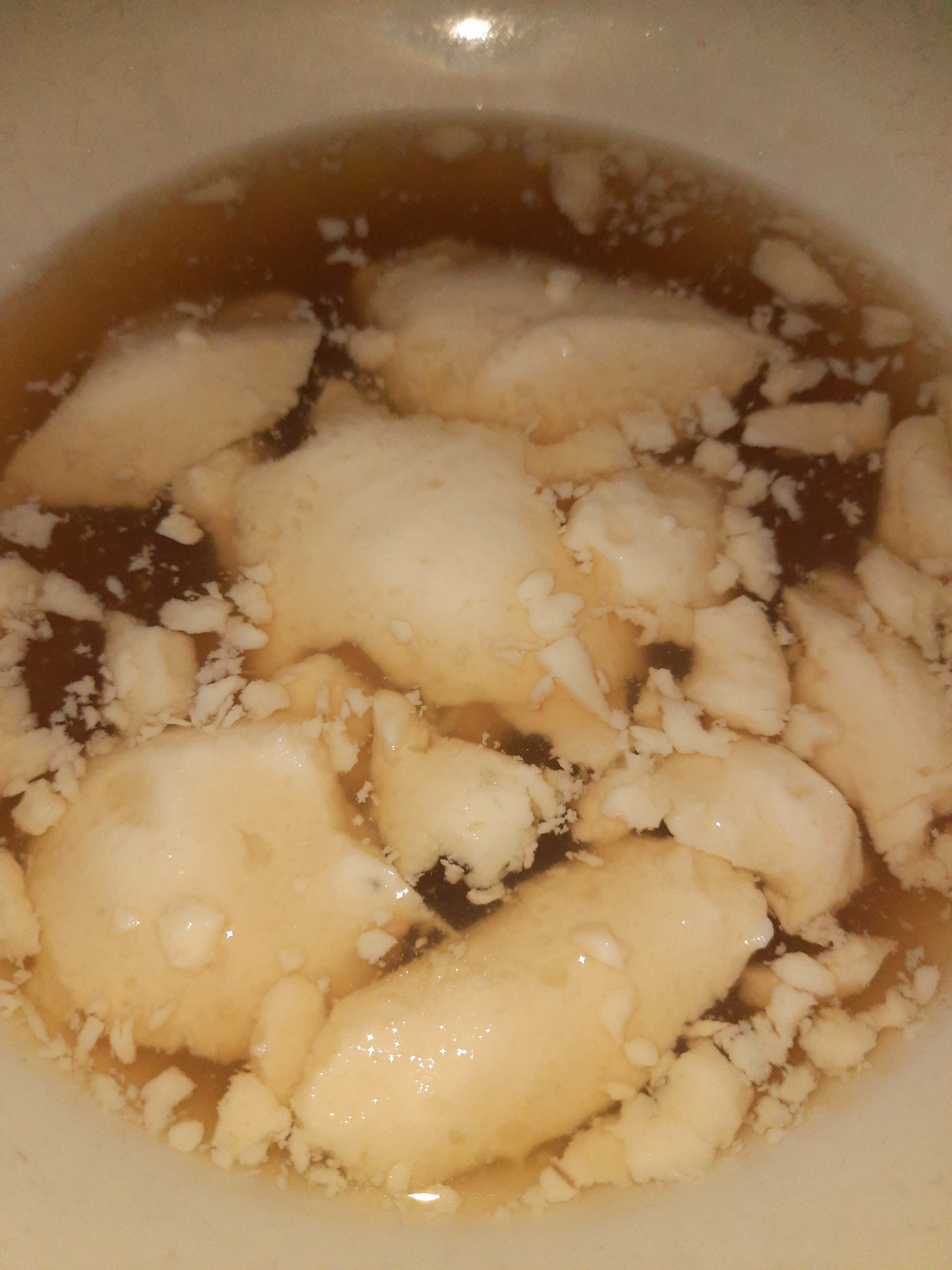
Tahwa, served with sweet ginger palm sugar syrup and peanut

In Java, it is known as kembang tahu, ꦮꦺꦢꦁꦠꦲꦸ wedang tahu "hot tofu soup" or tahwa derived from Hokkien tau hwe. They are usually sold by hawkers. It is served warm or cold with palm sugar syrup that has been flavored with pandan leaves and ginger.

==== Malaysian and Singaporean cuisine ====
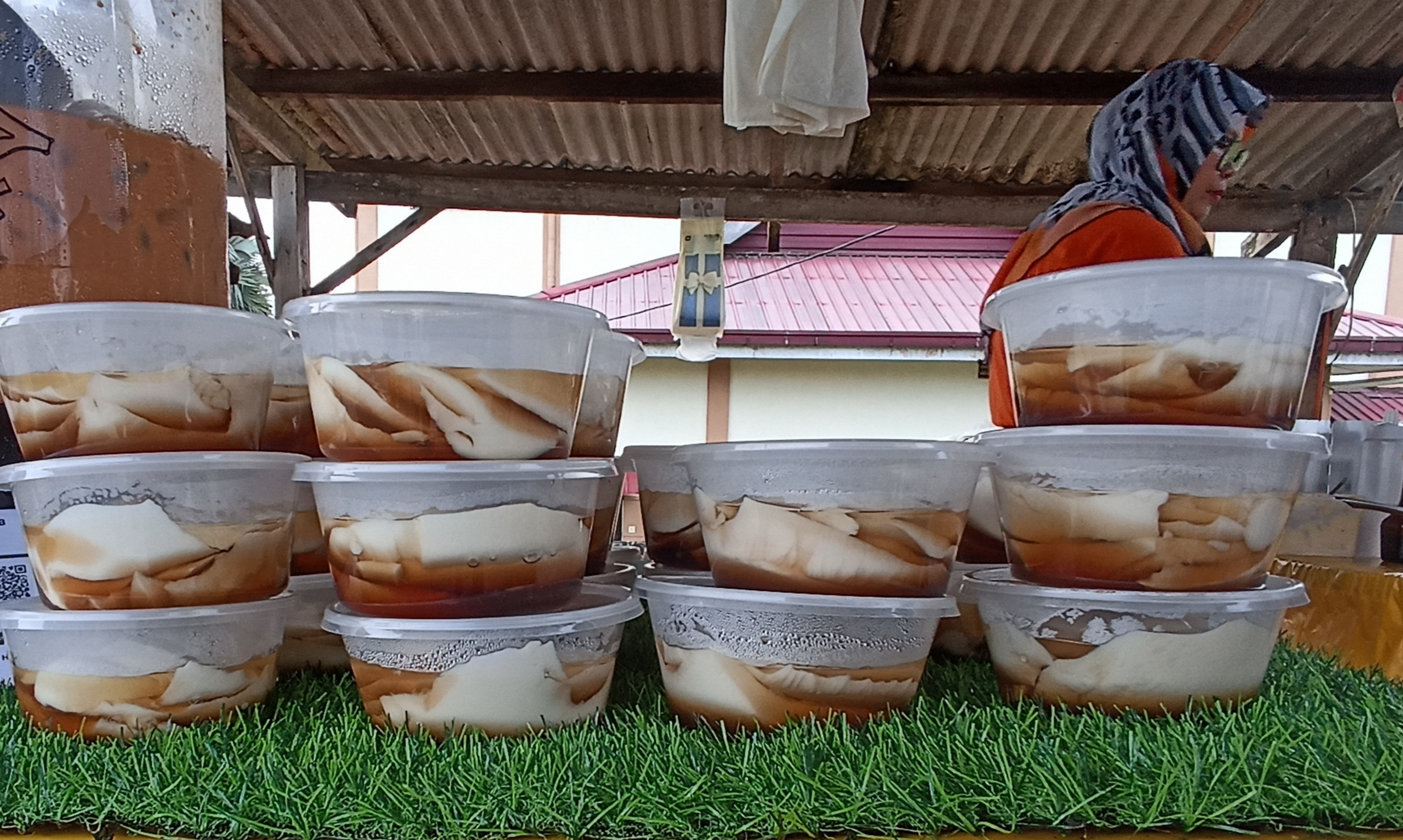
Tau fu fa doused in palm sugar syrup

In Malaysia and Singapore, it is more commonly known by its names tau hua or tau huay in Hokkien; and tau fu fa in Cantonese, with the latter being more common in Malaysia. In Penang, the common term is tau hua, due to Hokkien being its dominant local Chinese language. In Kelantan, the dish is known as pati soya (lit. 'soy essence').

It is usually served either with a clear sweet syrup alone, with ginkgo seeds suspended in the syrup, or in a sugar syrup infused with pandan. Alternatively, it can also be served with gula melaka syrup.

==== Thai cuisine ====
In Thailand, it is known by its Chinese Hokkien name taohuai (เต้าฮวย). It is usually served cold with milk and fruit salad, which is known as taohuai nom sot (เต้าฮวยนมสด, literally "douhua in fresh milk") or taohuai fruit salad (เต้าฮวยฟรุตสลัด), or served hot with ginger syrup, which is known as taohuai nam khing (เต้าฮวยน้ำขิง).

==== Vietnamese cuisine ====
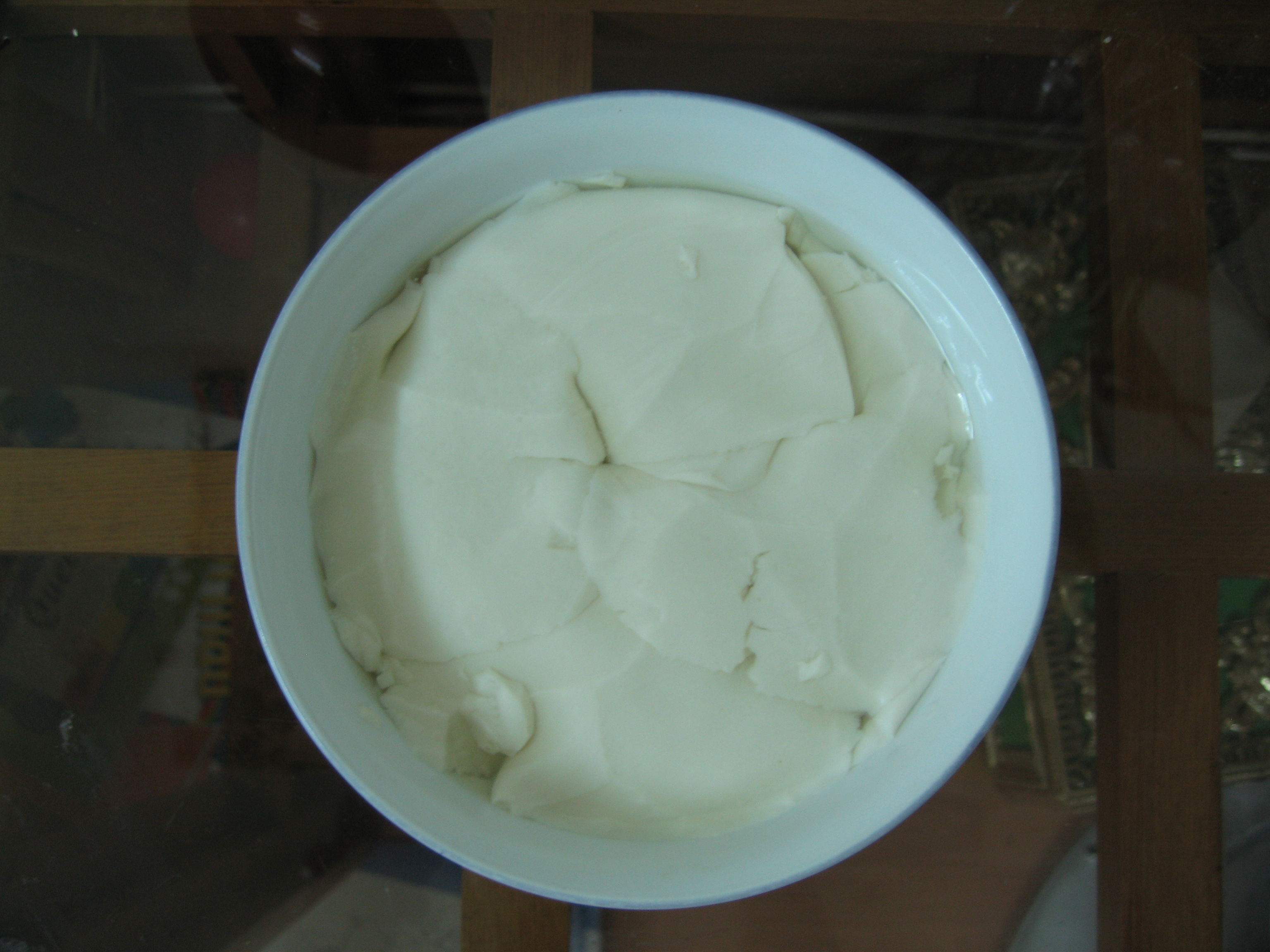
A bowl of Hanoi tào phớ

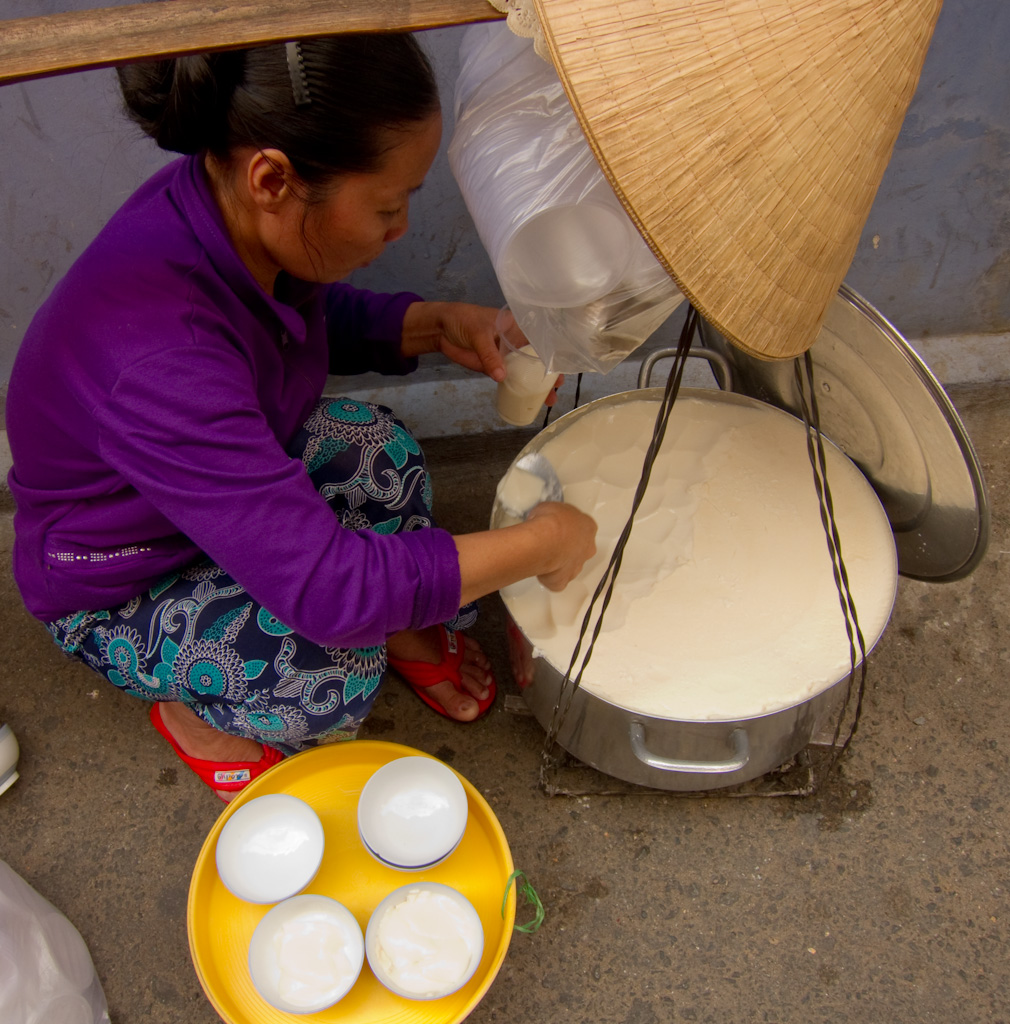
A woman selling tào phớ

In Vietnam, it is known as tàu hủ nước đường, tàu hủ hoa or tào phớ, đậu hủ, tàu hủ. It varies in three regions in Vietnam:

- Northern region – served with jasmine infused sugary water. It is enjoyed as warm in winter and cold with ice in summer.
- Central region – cooked with spicy ginger. Sugar is added. Douhua pieces are usually unshaped because of their softness.
- Southern region – same with Central region. Often served warm with sugar water, ginger is added. Coconut milk or tapioca pearls are optional.

Vietnamese sweet tofu is generally the same, sometimes it will changes based on summer or winter seasons.

== Nutritional value and health benefits ==
Douhua is rich in nutrients, contains iron, calcium, phosphorus, magnesium and other trace elements necessary for the human body. It also contains sugar, vegetable oil, and high-quality protein. The digestion and absorption rate of tofu is more than 95%.

In addition to its function of increasing nutrition and helping digestion, tofu is also beneficial to the growth and development of teeth and bones. It can increase iron element in people's blood in the hematopoietic function; tofu does not contain cholesterol, which is very beneficial to people with hypertension, high blood lipids, hypercholesterolemia, arteriosclerosis, and coronary artery disease. It is a valuable food supplement for children and the elders.

Tofu is rich in phytoestrogens as well, which has an effect on preventing and inhibiting osteoporosis, breast cancer, prostate cancer, and blood cancer. The sterols and stigmasterol in tofu are both effective ingredients for suppressing cancer.

== Packaged ==
The dessert is also sold in North American Asian supermarkets in plastic containers.

== Requirements ==
Like all tofu, douhua must have a coagulant, often gluconolactone for smoothness as compared with other coagulants.

Tofu pudding made from agarwood, edible gum, and seaweed extracts is more like soy milk-flavored jelly pudding. Because it melts into liquid soy milk when heated, it can only be eaten at room temperature, but the success rate of making it is extremely high. It is high and easy, so it is widely used.

== In popular culture ==
Tofu pudding was featured on the Netflix TV series, Street Food, in the Chiayi, Taiwan episode.

== See also ==
- Dim sum
- Tofu
- Taho
- Soy yogurt
- List of tofu dishes
