= Pares (food) =

Filipino braised beef stew

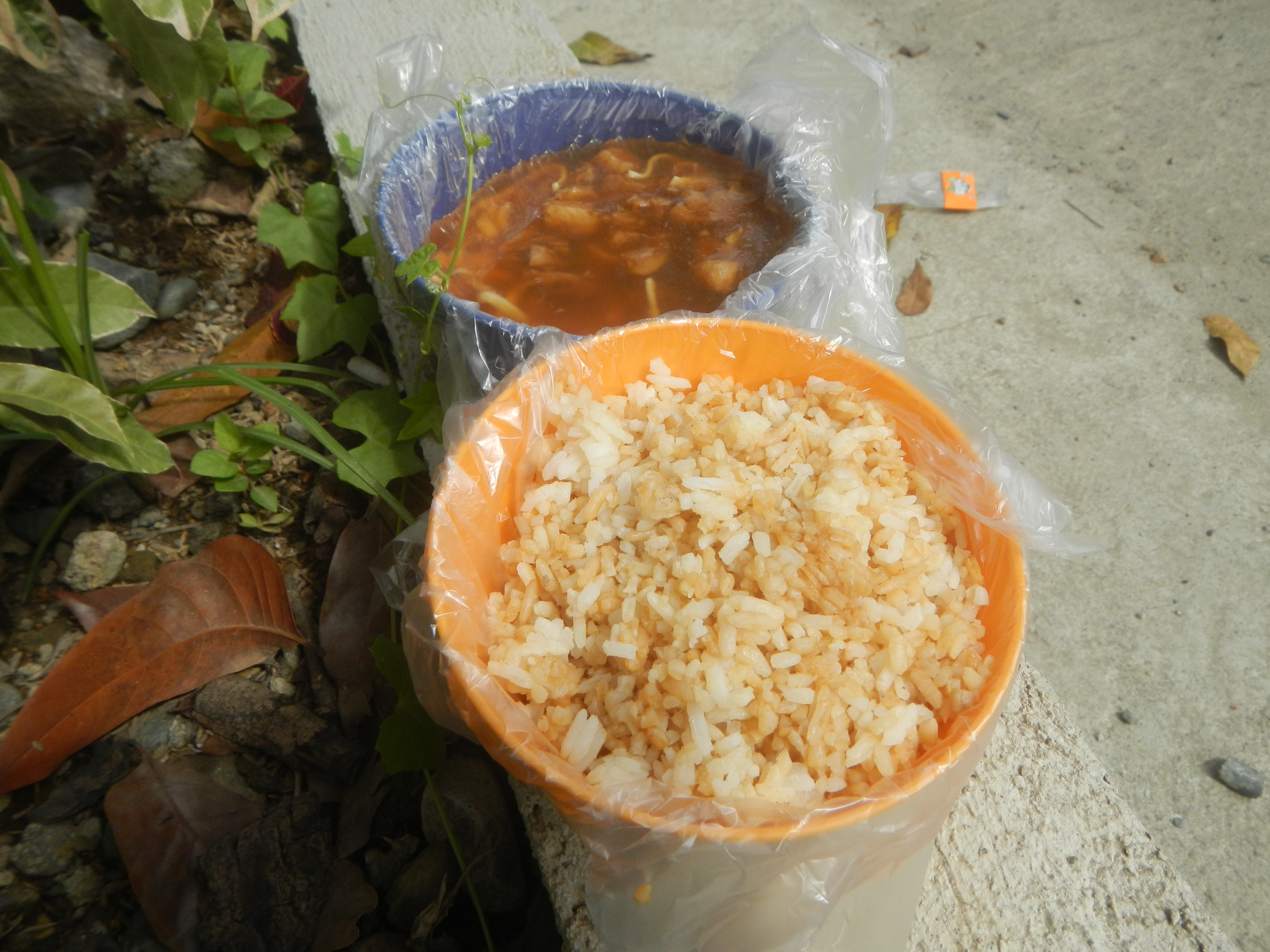
- Top: beef asado pares; bottom: pares kanto
- Place of origin: Philippines
- Region or state: Quezon City
- Created by: Lolita Tiu
- Invented: 1979
- Serving temperature: Hot
- Main ingredients: Clear soup (commonly beef-based broth); Sinangag; Beef asado (or any other viand)
- Variations: Pares kanto or pares kariton, pares mami, pares overload

Pares (Tagalog pronunciation: [paˈɾɛs]), also known as beef pares, is a term for a serving of Filipino braised beef stew with garlic fried rice, and a bowl of clear soup. It is a popular meal particularly associated with specialty roadside diner-style establishments known as paresan ("pares house"). In recent years, it had also become a common dish served in small eateries called carinderias that serve economical meals for locals.

Informally, pares can also refer to any dish that is cooked in the manner of Philippine "Chinese-style" asado (i.e. stewed in a sweet-soy sauce).

== Etymology ==
The origin of the term pares is credited to the carinderia Jonas established by Lolita Tiu and Roger Tiu in 1979 at the corner of Mayon Street and Malindang Street in Quezon City, near Calle Retiro (present-day N.S. Amoranto Sr. Street) in Quezon City. The term literally means pairs in English and comes from the practice of pairing the beef asado dish with sinangag (garlic fried rice) and a light beef broth soup; thus, forming a complete meal.

== Description ==
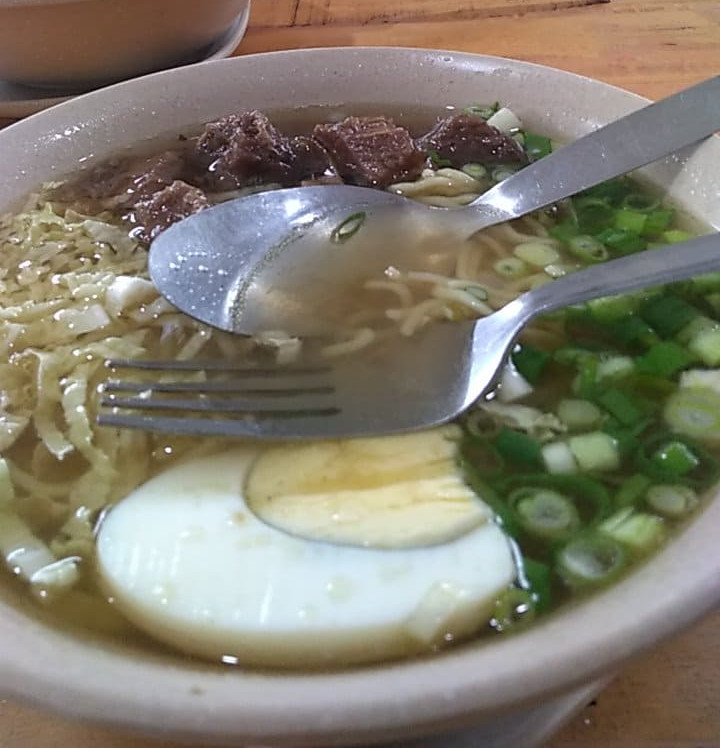
Beef pares mami

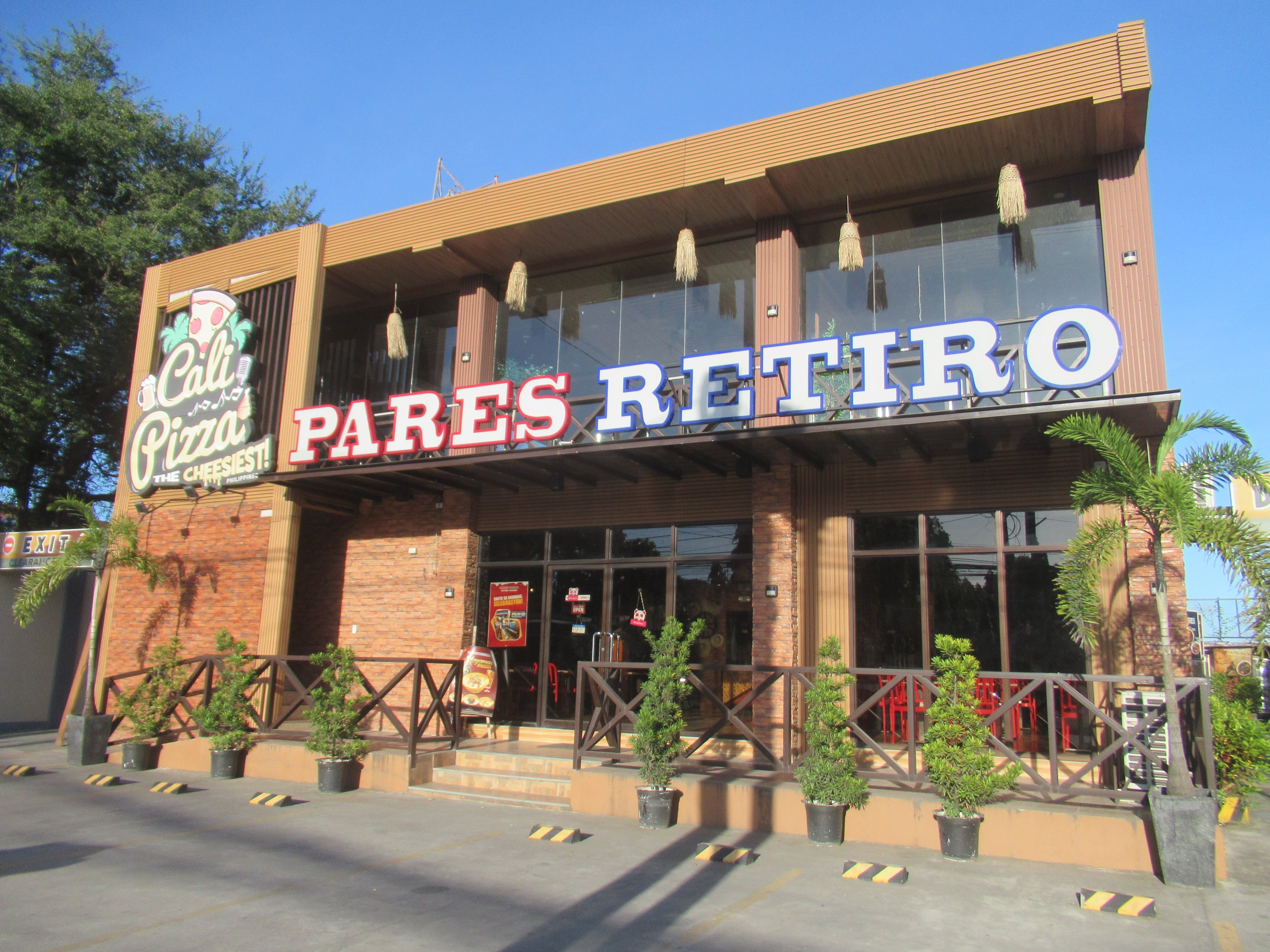
Pares Retiro, a franchise of restaurants selling beef pares.

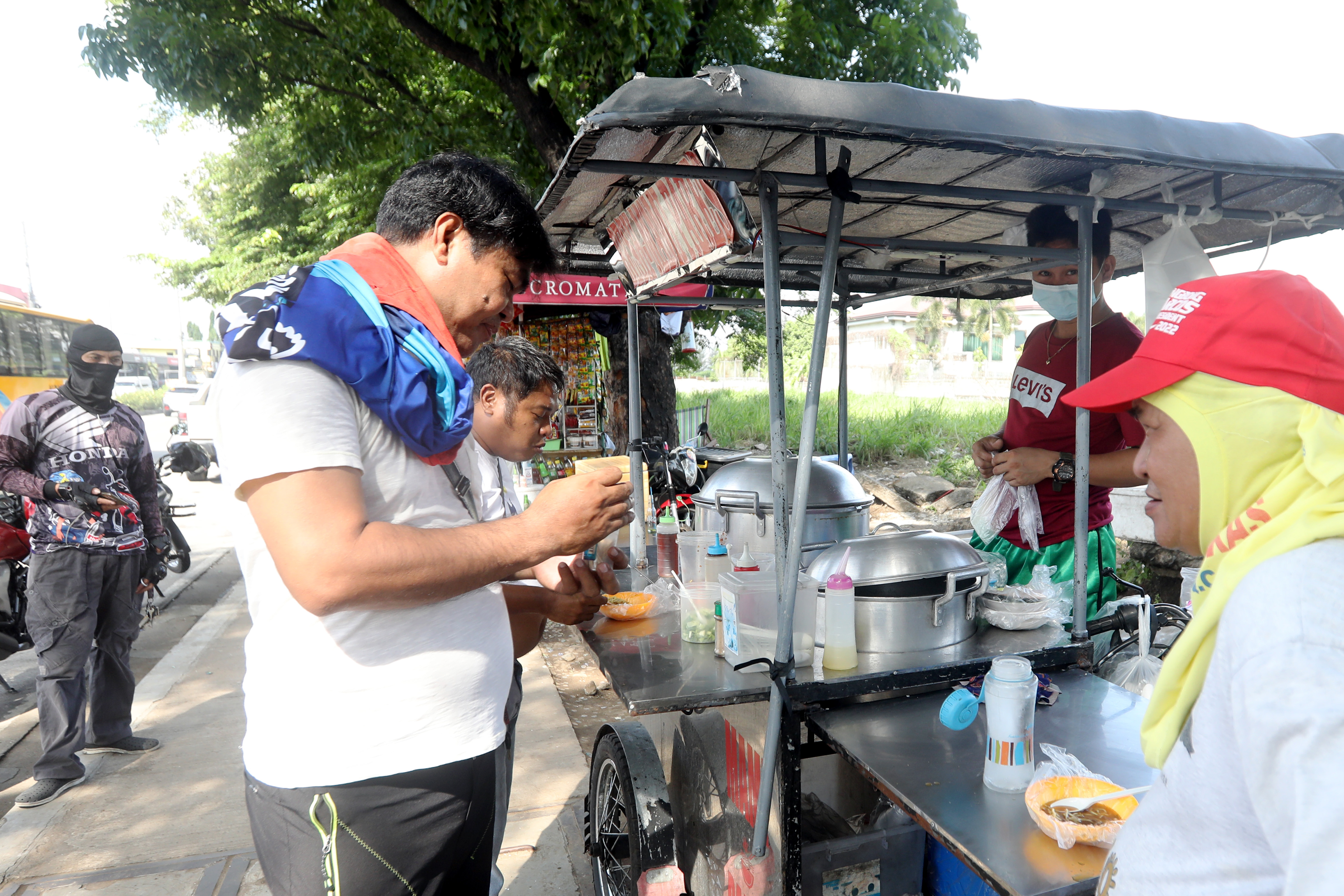
A beef pares mami stall in Quezon City.

Beef pares, or pares as it is commonly known, is a meal that consists of beef asado (beef stewed in a sweet-soy sauce), garlic fried rice, and a bowl of beef broth soup. The soup may originate from the broth in which the meat is simmered in until tender before being seasoned with the sweet-soy sauce, but it can also be prepared separately and be made with beef bouillon cubes instead. This soup is usually made and seasoned with onion, garlic, peppercorns, chives, and onion leeks. Some cooks also add bay leaves to this broth to improve the flavor.

Another variation of the dish, informally known as pares kariton ("pushcart pares") or pares kanto ("street corner pares") for being served on the roadside by mobile sidecar vendors, serves the beef and broth combined, usually with the broth slightly thickened by cornstarch. This variant is less sweeter and has less spices compared to the beef asado variant but is more savory due to the use of beef tendons (litid), bone marrow (utak ng buto), and fatty cuts of beef.

A garnish of chopped green onion and fried garlic mince is often added atop the dish before serving. Steamed rice is sometimes served instead of fried rice, depending on personal preference of the customer. Some Filipino restaurants also offer the option to serve the dish with an accompaniment of noodles instead of rice.

Another common way to eat pares is as beef pares mami (or simply pares mami). It combines pares with mami, the Filipino egg noodle soup. Its preparation is similar to pares kanto with the main difference being the addition of noodles instead of being eaten with rice. Its taste has been described as being similar to Vietnamese pho.

Pares overload refers to a recent trend of serving pares kanto with fried pork lechon and chicharong bulaklak (fried pork mesentery); a variant of this served with whole stewed bone marrow is also known as pares putok-batok ("nape-exploding pares", more loosely "heart attack pares" or "high blood pressure pares") due to the unhealthy amount of fat and cholesterol contained by the toppings. It was introduced as early as 2021 and was popularized by the sidewalk eatery Diwata Pares Overload in the first quarter of 2024 with the trend having grown popularity through social media sites.

== See also ==
- List of beef dishes
- Mami soup
- Mechado, a similar Filipino braised beef dish
