= Mamie Creek (Iowa) =

Stream in Pottawattamie County, Iowa, U.S.

Coordinates: 41.332773°N 95.662229°W

Location
- Country: United States
- State: Iowa
- District: Pottawattamie

Mamie Creek is a stream in Pottawattamie County, Iowa, in the United States.

Mamie Creek was named for Ms. Mamie Cress, a pioneer who settled near it.

== See also ==
- List of rivers of Iowa
