= Mami soup =

Philippine noodle soup

Mami
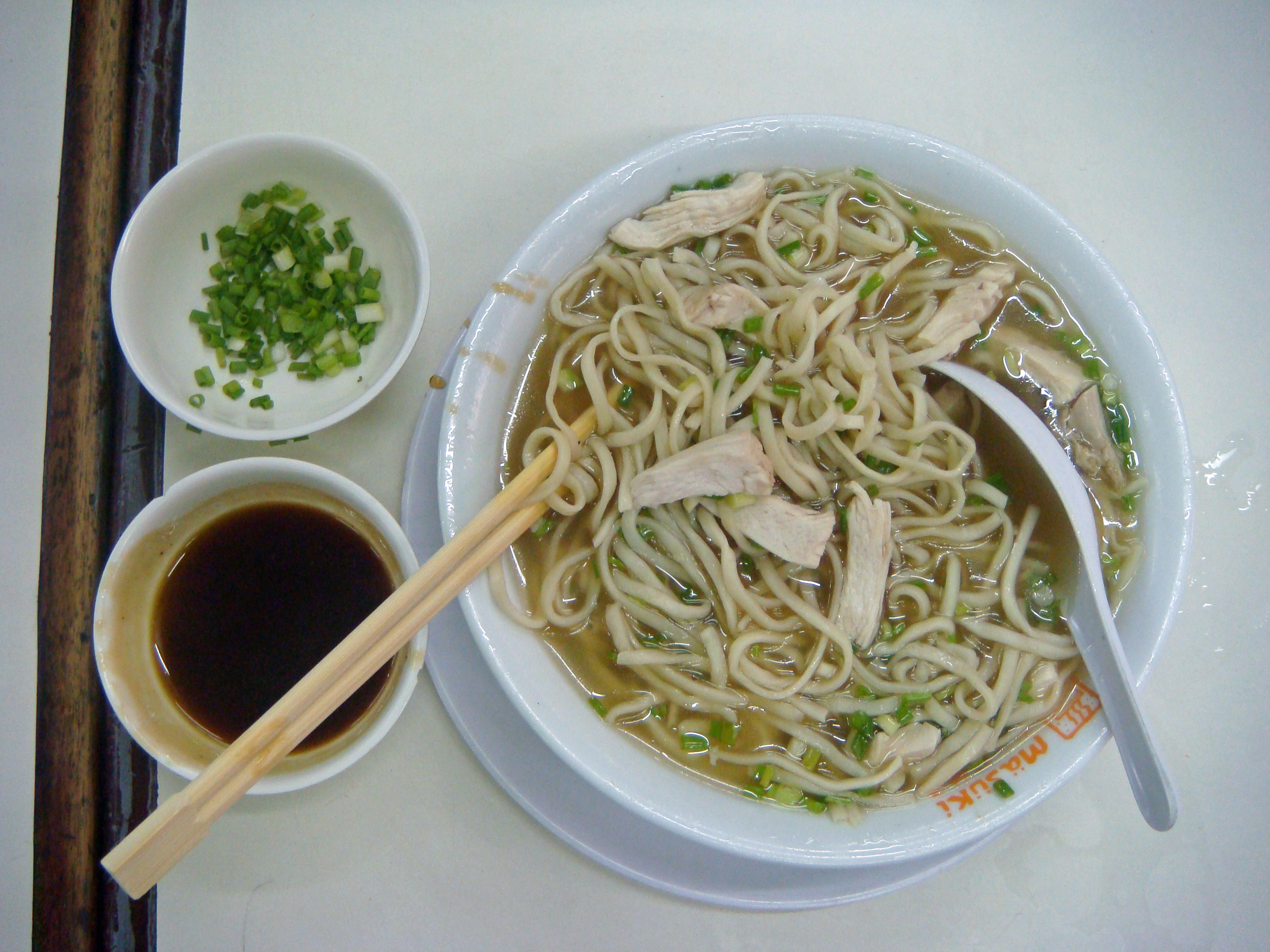
- Chicken mami of Masuki restaurant
- Type: Soup
- Course: Main course
- Place of origin: Philippines
- Region or state: Binondo, Manila
- Created by: Ma Mon Luk
- Invented: 1920
- Main ingredients: Noodles; meat (chicken, beef, pork, wonton)

Mami (pronounced: MAH-mee) is a popular Filipino noodle soup made with wheat flour noodles, broth and the addition of meat (chicken, beef, pork) or wonton dumplings. It is related to the pancit class of noodle dishes, and the noodles themselves are sometimes called pancit mami.

== Origin and etymology ==
Its creation is generally attributed to Ma Mon Luk, a Chinese immigrant to the Philippines who began selling noodles served with chicken broth and chicken meat in Binondo, Manila in 1920. He originally worked as an ambulant vendor, carrying the food in two metal vats on a pole much like taho vendors. Thus, mami was originally street food, but with the success of his business, Ma eventually opened up an eatery and ultimately a chain of restaurants bearing his name. As a street vendor, Ma originally called his dish "gupit", after the Tagalog word for “cut”, because he would cut the noodles and chicken with scissors. He later decided to call the dish "Ma mi" (simplified Chinese: 马面; traditional Chinese: 馬麵; Cantonese Yale: Máh-mihn; Pe̍h-ōe-jī: Má-mī; lit. 'Ma’s noodles'). However, Ma did not have the name trademarked. Soon, imitation noodle soups sprouted with a name that was, personally, his.

Alternately, mami is thought to come from manok (chicken) and miki (a type of noodle). This is supported by beef or pork mami sometimes being known as bami, from baboy' (pork/pig) or baka (beef/cow).

Regardless, the claim that Ma "invented" mami, both the dish itself and the term, is likely untrue. According to linguist Gloria Chan-Yap, mami is Fujianese in origin, not Cantonese; in Philippine Hokkien literally means "meat noodles" (simplified Chinese: 肉面; traditional Chinese: 肉麵; Pe̍h-ōe-jī: Mah-mī). Like the siopao, the noodle dish already existed in Filipino-Chinese cuisine before Ma popularized his version.

== See also ==
- Batchoy
- Maki mi
- List of noodle dishes
- List of soups
- Ramen
- Wonton noodles
