= Mamy =

Mamy may refer to:

- Jean Mamy, French actor, producer, film and theatre director, screenwriter and journalist
- Moms (film) (Russian: Mamy), a 2012 film

== See also ==
- "Mamy Blue", a song written by Hubert Giraud
