= Maki mi =

Filipino thick pork tenderloin soup

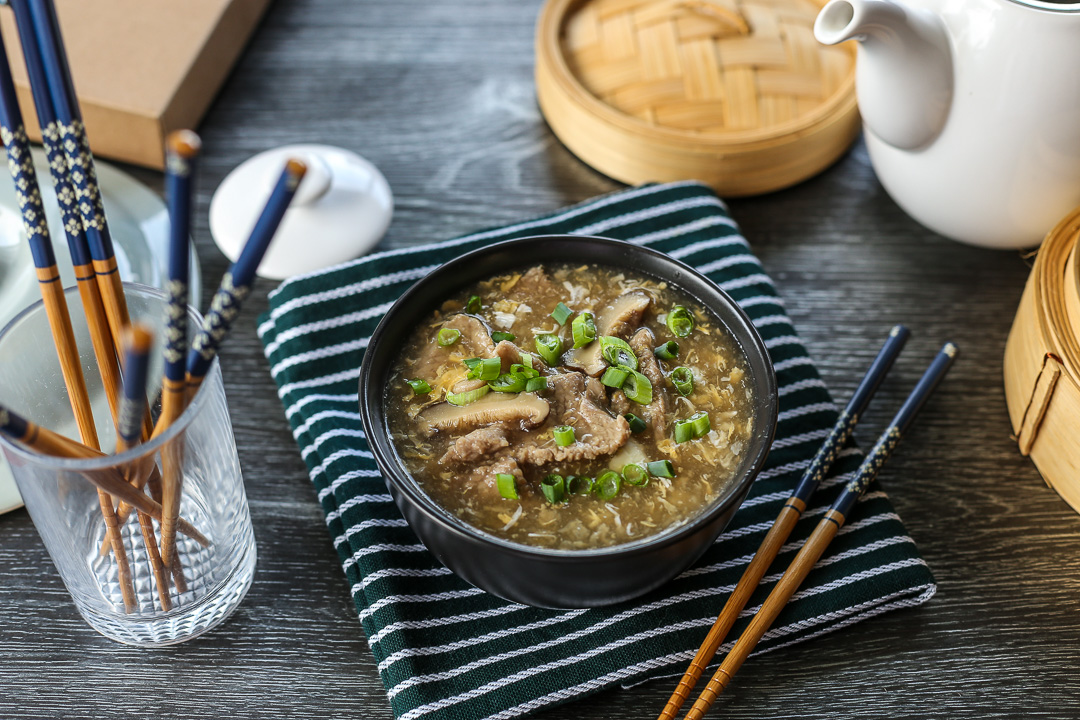
- Alternative names: Maki soup, Pork maki
- Course: soup
- Place of origin: Philippines
- Region or state: Binondo

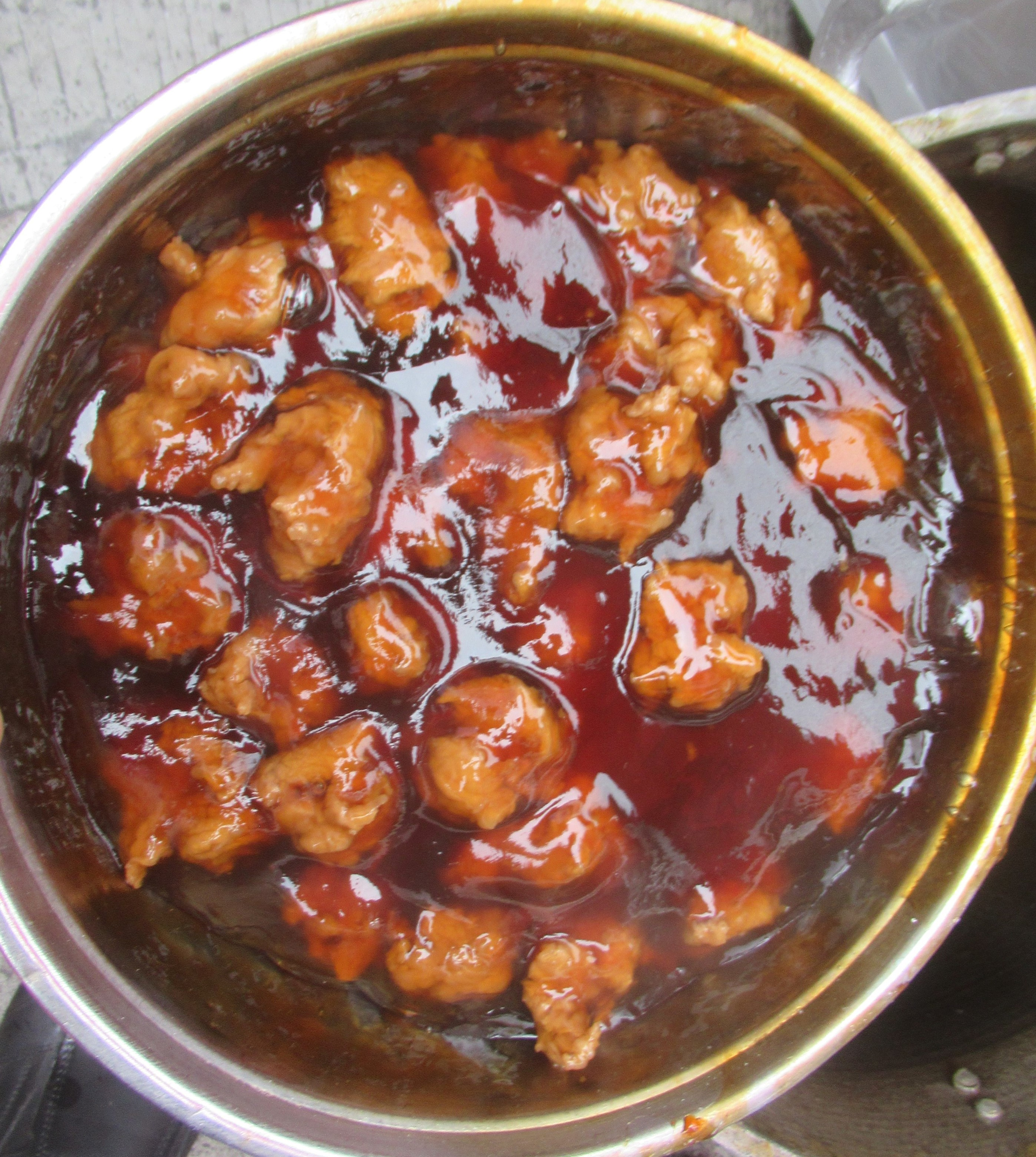
Maki in Binondo

Maki mi, also known as pork maki or maki soup, is a Filipino thick pork tenderloin soup originating from the Chinese-Filipino community of Binondo, Manila. It is made from lean pork tenderized by a meat mallet. It is marinated in soy sauce, garlic, black pepper, rice wine or vinegar, and onions before being covered with egg whites or starch (usually starch from corn, sweet potato or tapioca). It is then cooked in boiling beef stock, with beaten eggs dropped and stirred until they form strands. Egg noodles (mami) are also commonly added. The name "maki mi" takes its name from Hokkien Chinese (simplified Chinese: 肉羹面; traditional Chinese: 肉羹麵; Pe̍h-ōe-jī: Mah-kiⁿ-mī), meaning meat soup noodles.

== See also ==
- Pancit
- Mami soup
- Batchoy
