= Taho =

Philippine snack food

Tahô
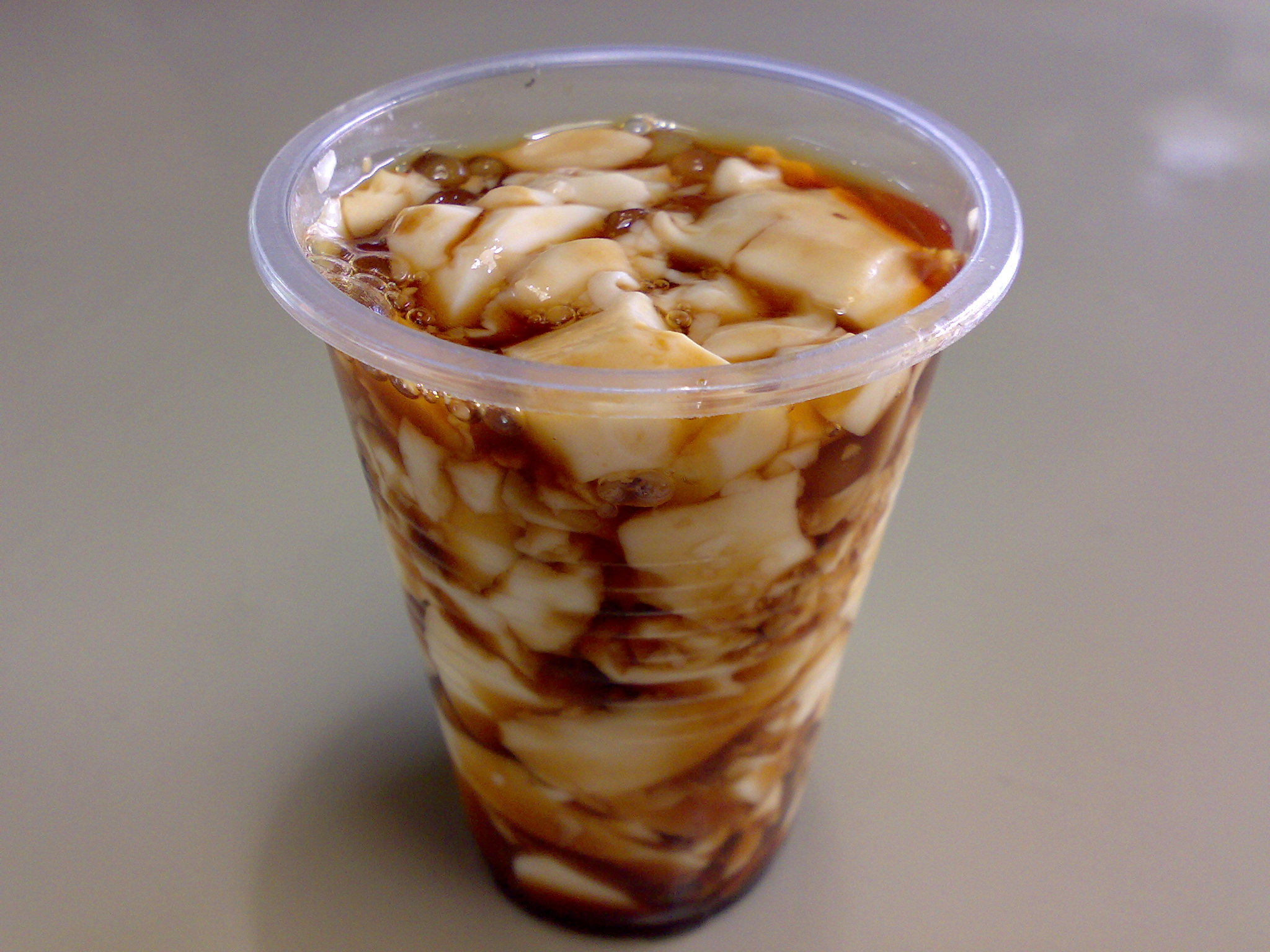
- A cup of tahô
- Course: Dessert, snack
- Place of origin: Philippines
- Serving temperature: Warm or room temperature
- Main ingredients: Silken tofu, arnibal (brown sugar syrup), sago pearls
- Food energy (per serving): 323 kcal (1,350 kJ)
- Similar dishes: Douhua

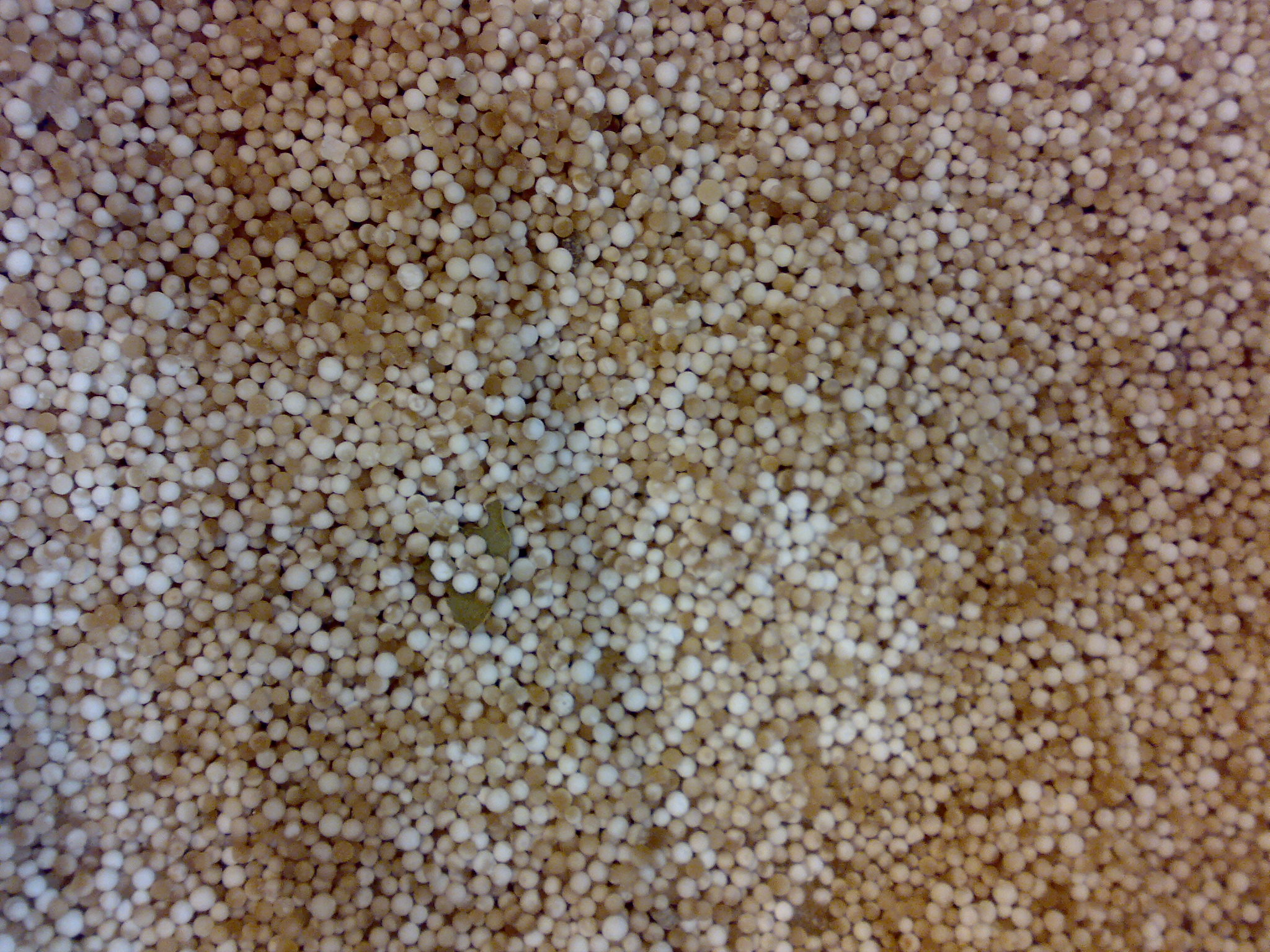
Raw sago "pearls"

Tahô (Tagalog: [tɐˈhoʔ]) is a Philippine snack food made of fresh soft/silken tofu, arnibal (sweetener and flavoring), and sago pearl (similar to tapioca pearls). This staple comfort food is a signature sweet and tahô peddlers can be found all over the country.

== History ==
The dish originated from China, and its name taken from the Hokkien pronunciation of Chinese: 豆腐; Pe̍h-ōe-jī: tāu-hū, which was introduced to the Philippines via Hoklo immigrants.

== Processing and preparation ==
Most tahô vendors prepare the separate ingredients before dawn. The main ingredient, fresh soft/silken tofu, is processed to a consistency that is very similar to a very fine custard. The brown sugar is caramelized and mixed with water to create a viscous amber-colored syrup called arnibal. Flavors like vanilla are sometimes added to the arnibal. Sago pearls, which can be bought at the local market, are boiled to a gummy consistency until they are a translucent white. In lieu of making soft tofu from scratch, one can use a soft tofu mix from the store.

Leftover tahô, if significant amounts are found, is sometimes repurposed into tokwa ("tofu" in Filipino).

== Marketing ==
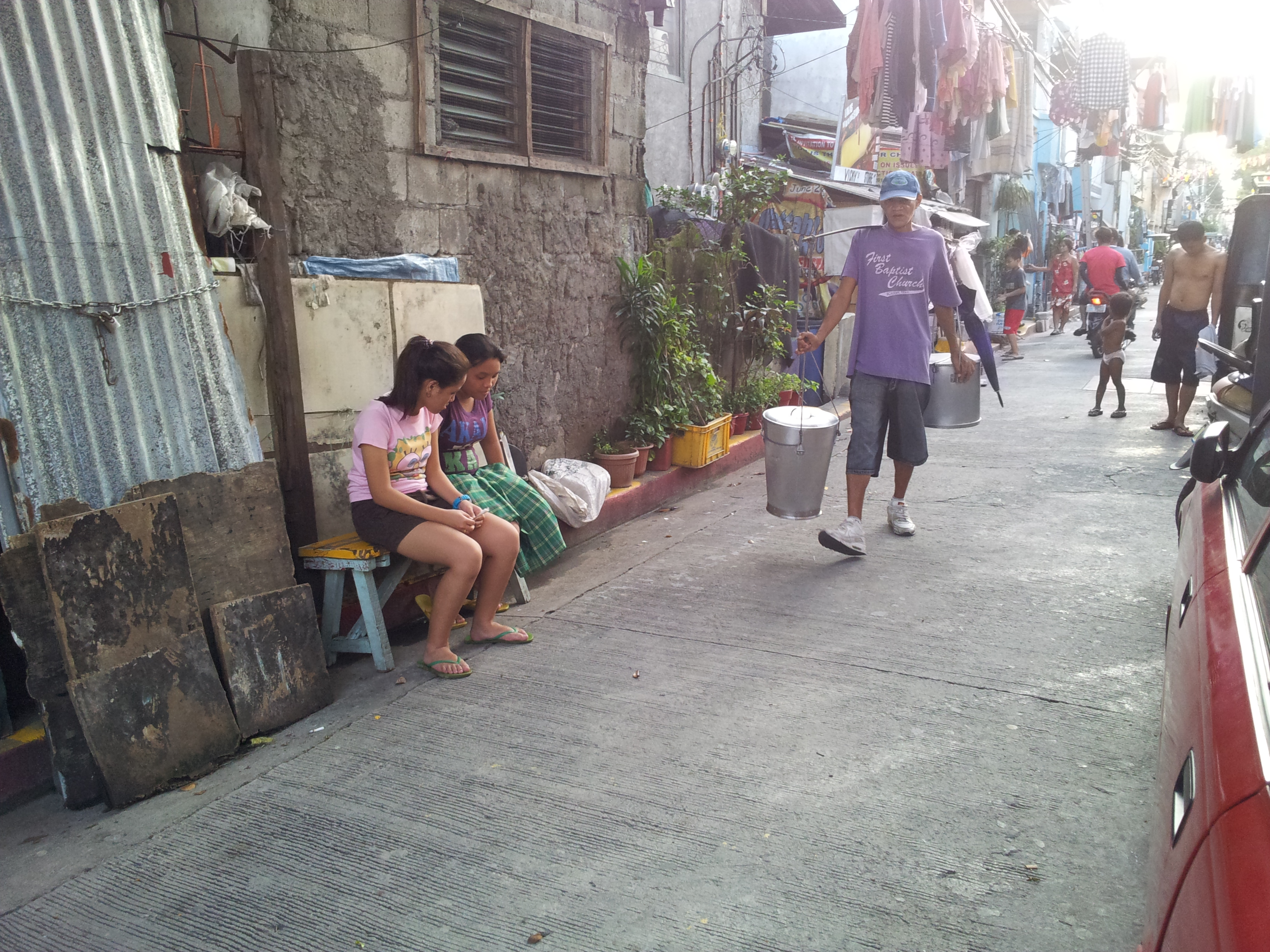
A mágtatahô walking through a residential area in Manila.

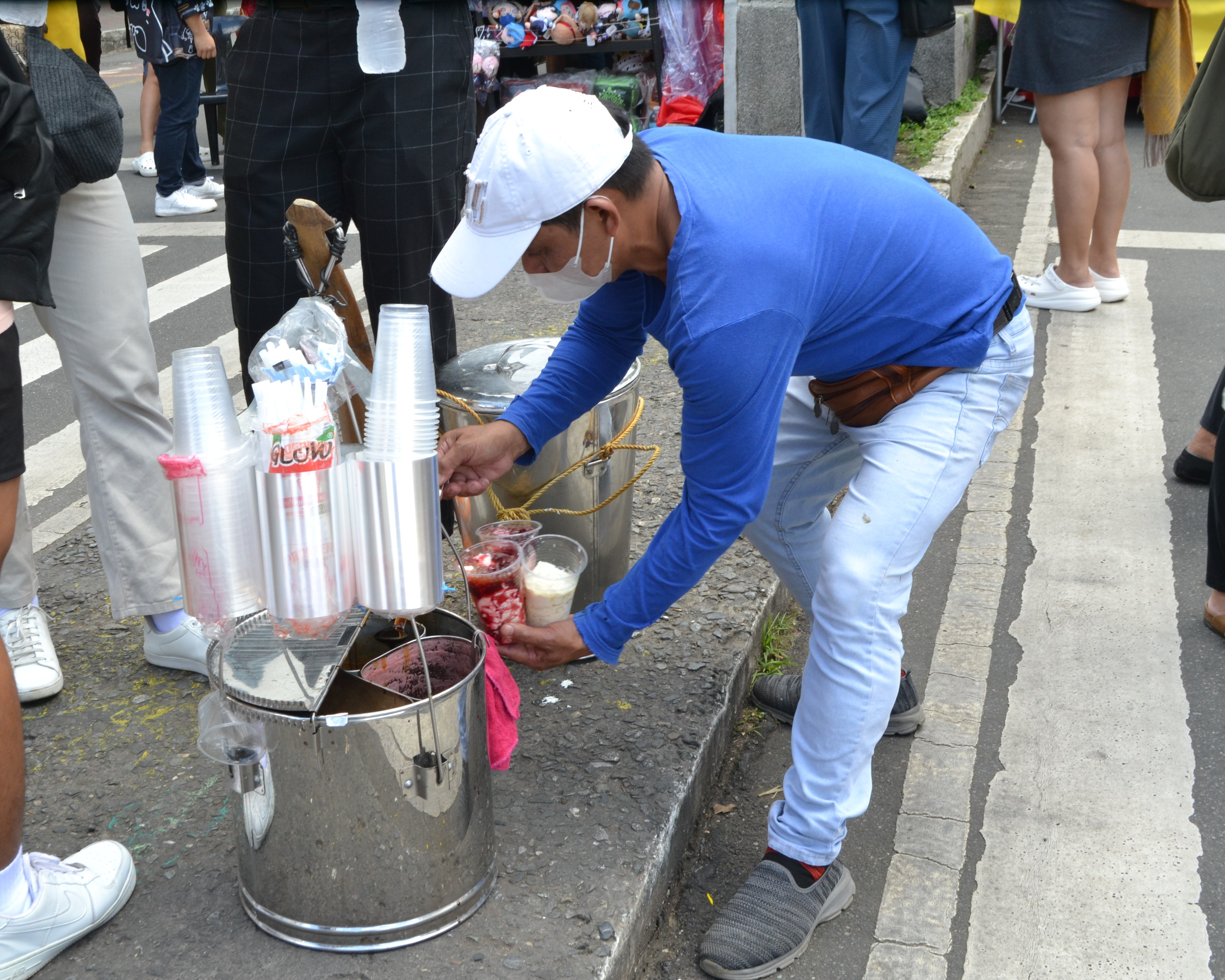
A strawberry taho vendor in Session Road, Baguio.

The Mágtatahô (tahô vendor) is a common sight in the Philippine streets. A mágtatahô carries two large aluminum buckets that hang from each end of a carrying pole. The larger bucket carries the tofu base; the smaller bucket holds the arnibal, sago pearls, and cash box.

Tahô vendors peddle their product in a distinctive manner, walking at a leisurely pace on the sidewalk or shoulder of the road. Most mágtatahô travel a habitual route and schedule, often calling out "Tahô!" in a loud and full rising inflection to attract customers’ attention. Although vendors are most likely to ply their routes early in the morning, it is not uncommon for a mágtatahô to work in the late afternoon or evening as well.

Most mágtatahô carry plastic cups, often in two sizes, and spoons or straws to serve their product. Some customers in residential areas tend to use their own cups, and the vendors price their product accordingly (usually at around twenty Philippine pesos, or US$0.42 for a standard-sized mug). Using a wide, shallow metal watch glass-shaped scoop, they skim the surface of the bean curd and toss out any excess water, before scooping the bean curd itself into a cup. Then, using a long, thin metal ladle with a tiny bowl, they scoop sago or tapioca pearls and arnibal into the cup, loosely mixing it in.

== Eating ==
Tahô is enjoyed either with a spoon, sipping it with a straw, or by simply slurping it straight from the cup. Though traditionally served warm, cold varieties exist in supermarkets and food stalls in cafeterias with bean curd in a solid, unbroken state. These pre-packed cups, sold with a plastic spoon or wooden ice pop stick, tend to contain firmer tofu.

== Varieties ==
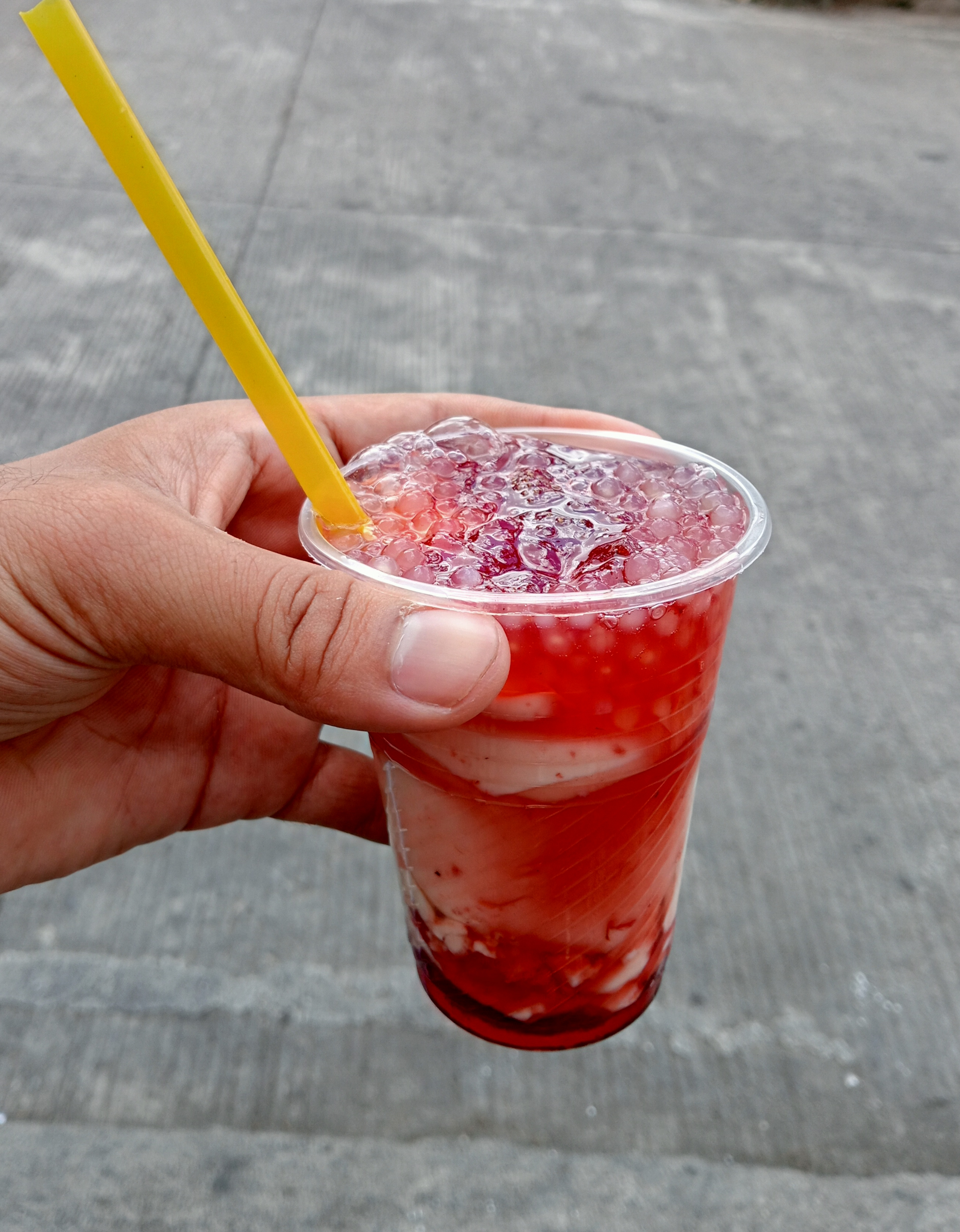
A strawberry taho in Baguio

In Baguio, there is also a strawberry variety of tahô, wherein strawberry syrup is used instead of arnibal. Other varieties use white cane sugar syrup, or chocolate sauce.

== See also ==
- Cuisine of the Philippines
- Filipino Chinese cuisine
- Tofu
- Douhua
- List of tofu dishes
