= List of Filipino restaurants =

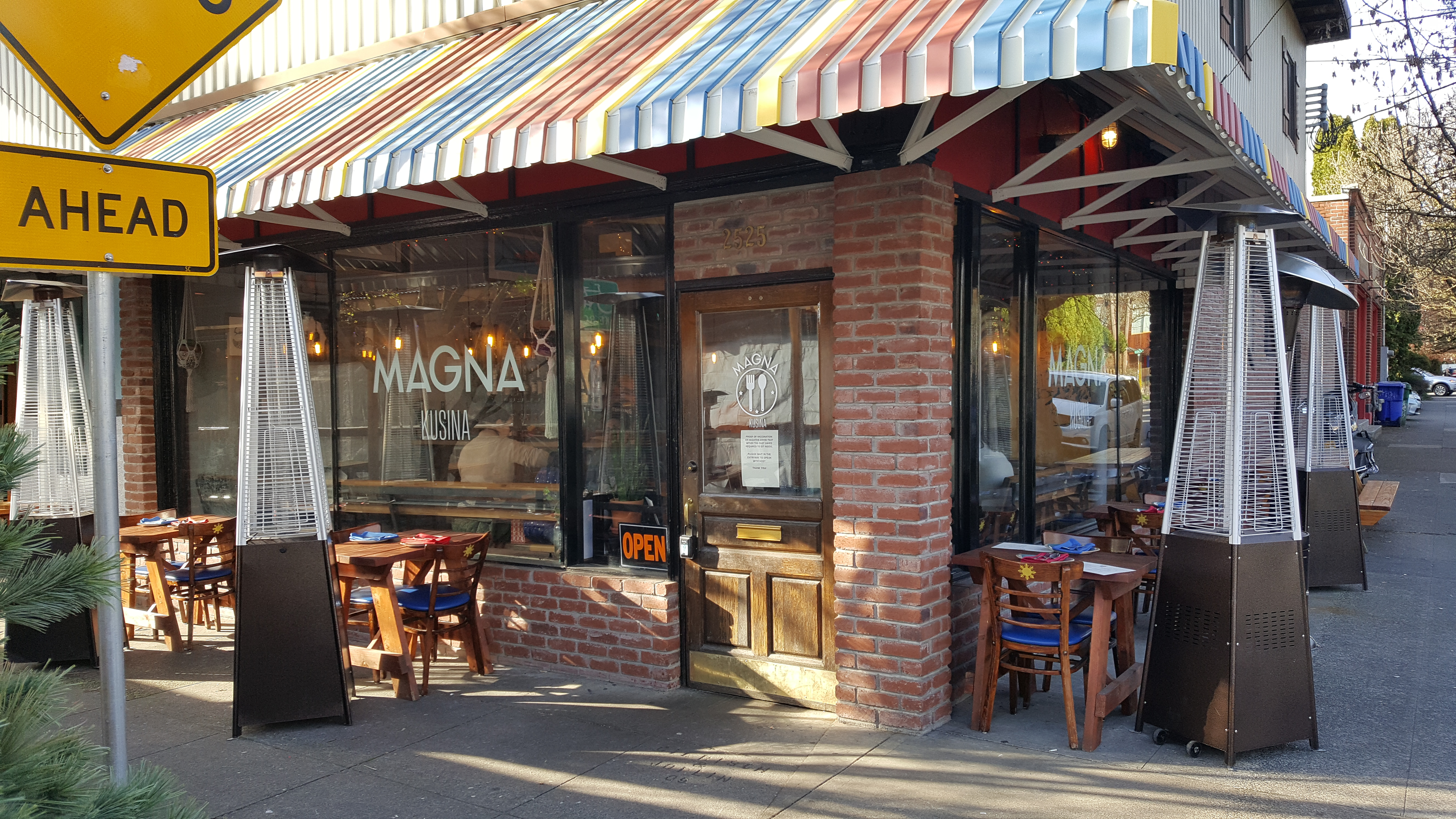
Magna Kusina, Portland, Oregon

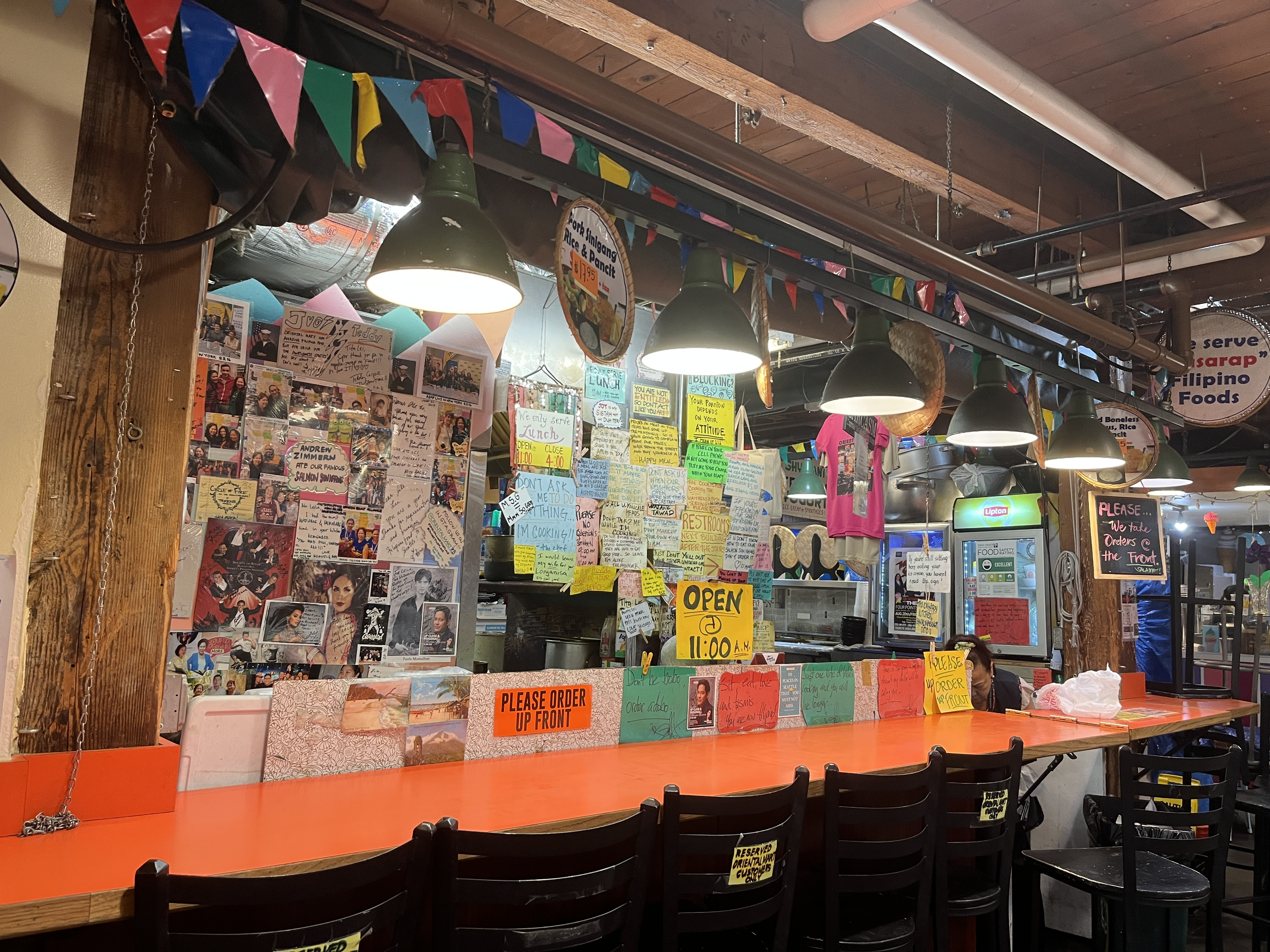
Oriental Mart, Seattle

This article lists notable restaurants known for serving Filipino cuisine:

- Andok's, Philippines
- Archipelago, Seattle, Washington
- Balong, Portland, Oregon
- Baon Kainan, Portland, Oregon
- BB's, Toronto, Ontario, Canada
- Botanical Bakeshop, Portland, Oregon
- Cabalen, Philippines
- Chowking, Philippines
- Classic Savory, Philippines
- Dencio's, Philippines
- Gerry's Grill, Philippines
- Helm, Philippines
- Hood Famous, Seattle, Washington
- Jollibee, Philippines
- Kasama, Chicago, Illinois
- Kilig, Seattle, Washington
- Kultura, Charleston, South Carolina
- Kusinang Matua, Pampanga, Philippines
- Kuya Lord, Los Angeles, California
- Ludi's, Seattle, Washington
- Magna Kubo, Beaverton, Oregon
- Magna Kusina, Portland, Oregon
- Mang Inasal, Philippines
- Max's Restaurant
- Morning Sun Eatery, Quezon City, Philippines
- Naides, San Francisco, California
- Musang, Seattle
- Neng Jr.'s, Asheville, North Carolina
- Oriental Mart, Seattle, Washington
- Palm Grill, Quezon City, Philippines
- Pinoyshki Bakery & Cafe, Seattle, Washington
- Spoon & Pork, Los Angeles, California
- Sun Rice, Portland, Oregon
- The Chicken Supply, Seattle, Washington

== See also ==
- Filipino Chinese cuisine
- Filipino-American cuisine
- List of restaurant chains in the Philippines
