= Musang (restaurant) =

Filipino restaurant in Seattle, Washington, U.S.

- Interactive map of Musang

Restaurant information
- Established: 2017
- Owner: Melissa Miranda
- Chef: Melissa Miranda
- Food type: Filipino
- Location: 2524 Beacon Ave S, Seattle, King, Washington, 98144, United States
- Coordinates: 47°34′49.2″N 122°18′46.3″W

Musang is a Filipino restaurant in Seattle's Beacon Hill neighborhood, in the U.S. state of Washington.

== Description ==
The menu has included buttermilk fried chicken, pork lumpia with sawsawan, short rib kare-kare basted with peanut butter bagoong, as well as vegetables in coconut sauce and vegan shrimp paste.

== History ==
Chef and owner Melissa Miranda started Musang as a brunch popup series in the summer of 2017. Later that year Miranda came together with other local Filipino American chefs and aspiring entrepreneurs, including Chera Amlag of Hood Famous and Aaron Verzosa of Archipelago, to create ILAW Coalition.

In March 2019, Miranda announced publicly that her popup Musang was going to be a brick and mortar. She raised funds for the transition through Kickstarter and successfully exceeded her $75000 goal in 30 days. The brick and mortar restaurant opened in early 2020.

Miranda incorporated a community-based approach to managing the restaurant, starting multiple community service efforts. Once the restaurant shut down at the start of the COVID-19 pandemic, they provided over 200 meals a day. They funded this effort through community donations and grants. Even after re-opening, Miranda continued to provide free community meals for the rest of 2021. Furthermore, Miranda provided free Filipino food education programming for children through her Musang Little Wildcats program which was converted into Wildcats Catering in 2023.

In January 2024, Musang closed temporarily for repairs.

== Reception ==
In November 2020, Musang was named Seattle Metropolitan's Restaurant of the Year. In 2021 it was named Eater Seattle's Best Community-Focused Restaurant. Food & Wine named Miranda one of eleven best new chefs in the United States for her work at the restaurant. In The Infatuation's 2022 list of "The 25 Best Restaurants in Seattle", Aimee Rizzo wrote, "Eating at Musang is like being guests at a pal's dreamy dinner party" with "phenomenal takes on Filipino classics" that "make us want to stop everything and sing about them as if life were a movie musical".

== See also ==
- Filipino-American cuisine
- List of Filipino restaurants
