= Kilig (restaurant) =

Filipino restaurant in Seattle, Washington, U.S.

- Interactive map of Kilig

Restaurant information
- Food type: Filipino
- Location: 710 8th Avenue South, Seattle, King, Washington, United States
- Coordinates: 47°35′48″N 122°19′20″W
- Website: kiligseattle.com

Kilig is a Filipino restaurant in Seattle, Washington, United States.

== Description ==
The Filipino restaurant Kilig operates in Seattle's Chinatown–International District. The New York Times has described Kilig as the "hipper younger sibling" of Musang with a "kaleidoscopic" interior. The menu includes dandan noodles and pork adobo.

== Reception ==
The New York Times included the pork adobo in a list of the 23 best American dishes of 2023.

== See also ==
- List of Filipino restaurants
