= Botanical Bakeshop =

Plant shop and bakery in Portland, Oregon, U.S.

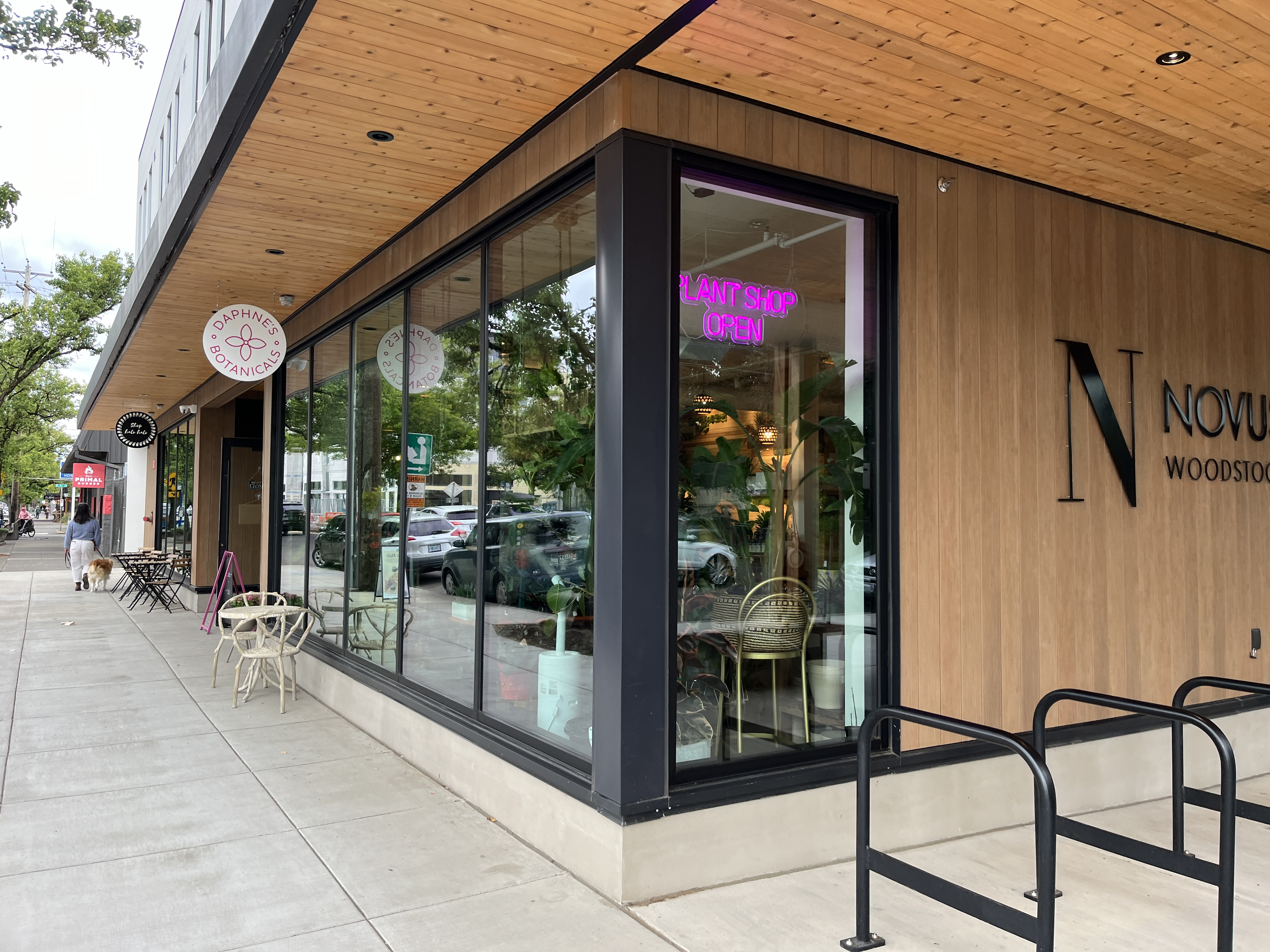
- Exterior of Daphne's Botanicals, 2024
- Interactive map of Botanical Bakeshop

Restaurant information
- Owners: Geleen Abenoja (Shop Halo Halo); Daphne Peters (Daphne's Botanicals)
- Food type: Filipino
- Location: 4981 Southeast Woodstock Boulevard, Portland, Multnomah, Oregon, 97206, United States
- Coordinates: 45.4796°N 122.6116°W

Botanical Bakeshop was the collective name of the plant shop Daphne's Botanicals and the bakery Shop Halo Halo, which operated from a shared space in the Novus Apartments, a mixed-use development in the Woodstock neighborhood of Portland, Oregon, United States. Daphne Peters opened Daphne's Botanicals in March 2023, and Geleen Abenoja opened Shop Halo Halo on June 10. The two Filipina-owned businesses intended to serve as a community hub for the local Filipino community. The bakery's Filipino cuisine such as bibingka, biko, cassava cakes, and pandesal garnered a positive reception.

== Description ==
Portland Monthly described Botanical Bakeshop as a "hybrid" bakery and plant shop. The space shared by Daphne's Botanicals and Shop Halo Halo, intended to serve as a community hub for the local Filipino community, had a living plant wall, wood paneling of various colors, rattan ceiling lamps, and a seating area. Botanical Bakeshop operated from the Novus Apartments, a four-story, 84-unit mixed-use development on Woodstock Boulevard at the intersection of 50th Avenue in southeast Portland's Woodstock neighborhood.

=== Daphne's Botanicals ===
In addition to houseplants, Daphne's Botanicals offered "houseplant design service". Customers could create their own terrariums on site and the shop hosted plant workshops.

=== Shop Halo Halo ===
The Oregonian and Eater Portland described Shop Halo Halo as a Filipino bakery and coffee shop. The owner described the interior as a "warm, living and breathing space” with foliage and other natural features to "pay homage to [her] family's ancestral land between the sea and the mountains". The menu included orange glazed cardamom buns, lavender calamansi shortbread, salted tahini chocolate chip cookies, ube cheese pandesal, and various vegan cheesecakes with fruit such as lilikoi and passionfruit. Shop Halo Halo also served bibingka, biko, black sesame butter mochis, and cassava cakes. The drink menu included barako cold brew with pandan cheese foam, guava lime spritzers, and matcha lattes. For Thanksgiving, the bakery offered buko pie, leche flan, peach mango cobbler, and ube cheesecake.

== History ==
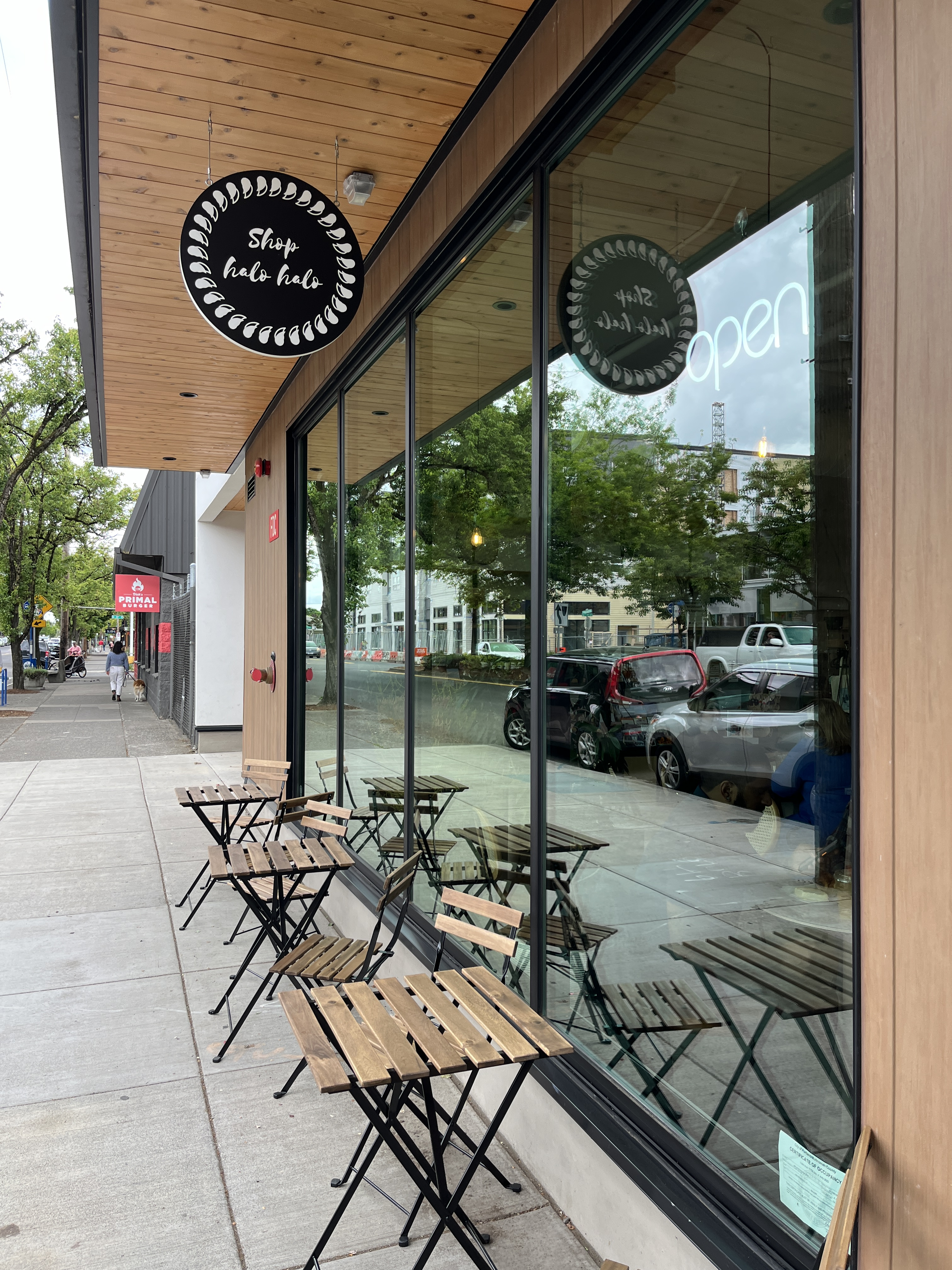
Exterior of Shop Halo Halo in 2024

The Novus Apartments development was designed by Kyle Rodrigues of Scott Edwards Architecture. Construction took place from June 2021 to December 2022 at a cost of $24 million.

Daphne Peters opened Daphne's Botanicals in March 2023. Geleen Abenoja opened Shop Halo Halo on June 10, 2023. Before moving into the Novus Apartments, Abenoja operated the business as a pop-up restaurant. She launched a GoFundMe campaign in an effort to raise $75,000 for the bakery's start-up costs, permits, construction, and kitchen equipment, and hosted a series of pop-up fundraisers prior to opening. The two Filipina-owned businesses co-hosted a grand opening in July. Upon opening, Shop Halo Halo was one of only two brick-and-mortar Filipino bakeries in Portland. The business hosted night markets and other cultural events.

== Reception ==
In 2024, Eater Portland's Krista Garcia included Shop Halo Halo in an overview of recommended eateries for "fantastic" Filipino cuisine in the Portland metropolitan area. Additionally, the website's Michelle Lopez included the business in a list of the area's "outstanding" bakeries. Rebecca Roland, Kara Stokes, and Janey Wong included the ube crinkle cookies in a 2024 list of Portland's best "decadent" cookies. Lopez and Wong also included the business in Eater Portland's 2025 overview of the city's best bakeries.

== See also ==
- Filipino-American cuisine
- List of bakeries
- List of defunct restaurants of the United States
- List of Filipino restaurants
