= Balong =

Filipino restaurant in Portland, Oregon, U.S.

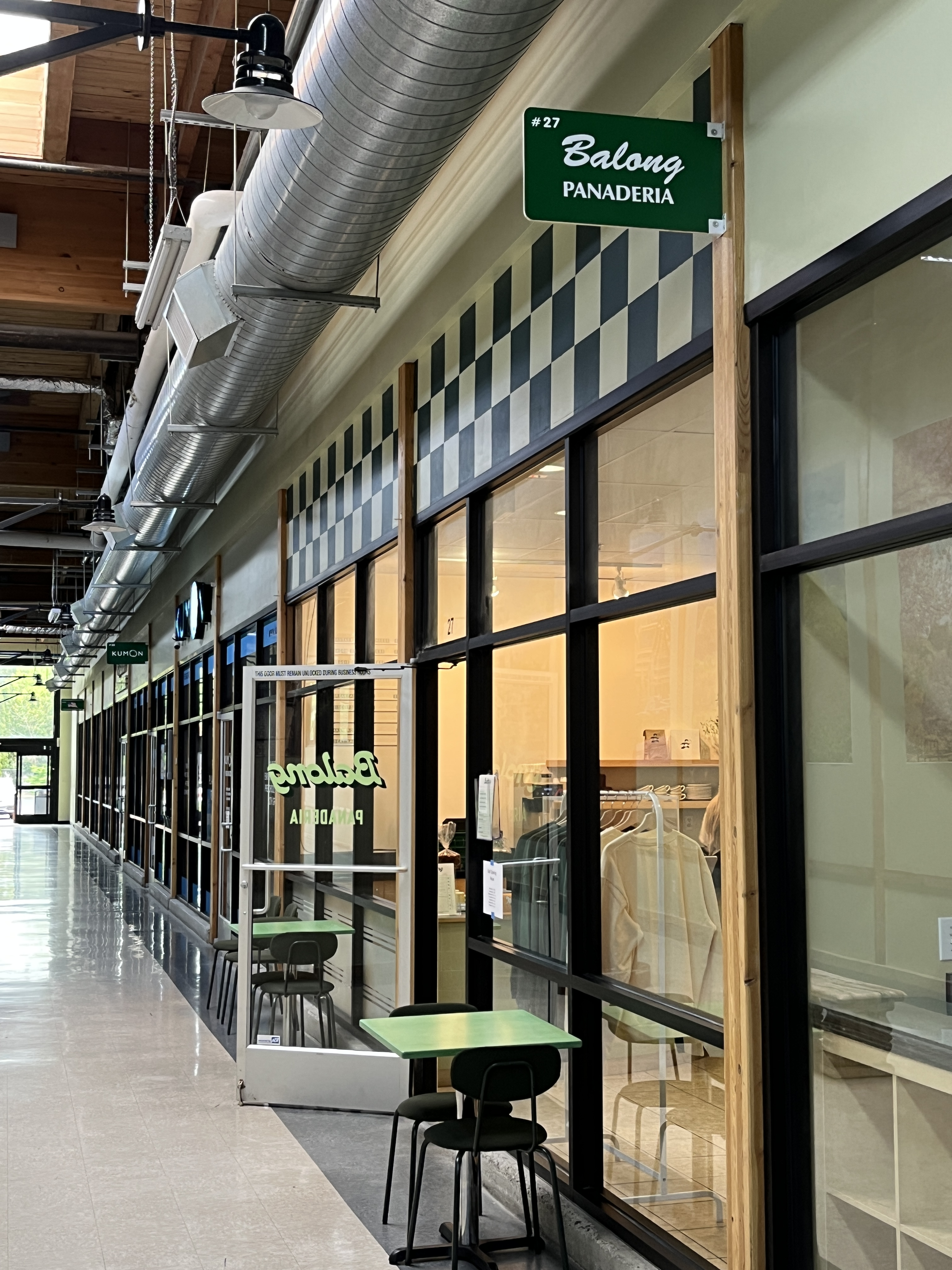
- The restaurant at Fubonn Shopping Center in 2025
- Interactive map of Balong

Restaurant information
- Owner: Justin Dauz
- Chef: Justin Dauz
- Food type: Filipino; Filipino-American
- Location: Portland, Multnomah, Oregon, United States
- Coordinates: 45.50164°N 122.57682°W

Balong Panaderia, or simply Balong, is a Filipino restaurant in Portland, Oregon, United States. Chef and owner Justin Dauz started the business as a pop-up restaurant before moving into a brick and mortar space at Fubonn Shopping Center on 82nd Avenue in southeast Portland's Powellhurst-Gilbert neighborhood in 2025. Balong serves breakfast sandwiches with pandesal, hash browns, and various baked goods, among other food options.

== Description ==
The Filipino (or Filipino-American) restaurant Balong operates at Fubonn Shopping Center on 82nd Avenue in southeast Portland's Powellhurst-Gilbert neighborhood. The menu includes breakfast sandwiches with pandesal and ingredients such as sausage, sun-dried tomato, and garlic aioli. Balong also serves hash browns and baked goods such as biscuits with cheddar and scallion, calamansi-strawberry bars, pandesal stuffed with cheese, and cinnamon rolls inspired by Cinnabon. The restaurant also serves biscuits and gravy.

== History ==
Chef Justin Dauz started Balong as a pop-up restaurant in 2022 or 2023. In April 2025, the business relocated to a brick and mortar space at Fubonn Shopping Center that was previously occupied by Meianna Bakery. Following a soft launch, the business was fully operational and open in May. The relocation followed a GoFundMe campaign.

In April 2025, Balong participated in Sobrang Sarap, a Filipino food tour of the Portland metropolitan area. May, Balong joined other local Filipino restaurants Baon Kainan and Magna Kusina to participate in a fundraiser for victims of the 2025 Vancouver car attack.

== Reception ==
The Oregonian included Balong in an overview of Portland's best new bakeries of 2025. The newspaper's Michael Russell included Balong in a 2025 list of Portland's ten best new restaurants. He also included the breakfast sandwich in the newspaper's list of Portland's 25 best dishes of 2025. Eater Portland's Zoe Baillargeon included the business in a 2025 list of the city's best new restaurants and food carts. Alex Frane included the business in Portland Monthly's 2025 list of restaurant opening that defined the city in 2025. The bibingka cornbread was included in Willamette Week's 2026 list of the city's best "cheap eats".

== See also ==
- List of Filipino restaurants
