= Baon Kainan =

Defunct Filipino restaurant in Portland, Oregon, U.S.

Restaurant information
- Closed: 2025
- Owners: Ethan and Geri Leung
- Food type: Filipino; Filipino-American
- Location: Portland, Multnomah, Oregon, United States
- Website: baonkainan.com

Baon Kainan was a Filipino restaurant in Portland, Oregon, United States. It garnered a positive reception, before closing in 2025.

== Description ==
The restaurant Baon Kainan served Filipino / Filipino-American cuisine in Portland, Oregon. The business operated from a food cart on Alberta Street called Alberta Carts, and later on Couch Street in the north Portland part of the Kerns neighborhood. Baon Kainan used the tagline "Not your tita's cooking". The restaurant's website said, "Our goal is to share our perspective on Filipino food through the lens of Filipino-Americans. Growing up predominantly in the U.S. and having a Filipino heritage makes our story unique but common to what second and third-generation Filipinos have experienced."

The menu included adobo made with smoked tamari and chicken stock, ensaïmadas, as well as kare-kare served with French fries. The business also served sisig with jackfruit and mushroom, Filipino spaghetti with banana ketchup tomato sauce, and calamansi cream puffs. The brunch menu included pork belly tosilog with eggs and garlic rice, and ube bibingka was among dessert options.

== History ==
The restaurant was owned by spouses Ethan and Geri Leung. It started as a pop-up in Seattle. In 2021, the couple relocated to Portland and moved Baon Kainan to a lot at Metalwood Salvage on Northeast Prescott Street.

Baon Kainan was part of the Sobrang Sarap food tour. It also hosted Balong as a pop-up serving breakfast sandwiches. In 2025, Baon Kainan was among local Filipino establishments that participated in a fundraiser for victims of the Vancouver car attack.

Baon Kainan ceased operations as a food cart in July 2025 and re‑opened under a new concept as Pamana at The Hoxton, Portland, in Old Town Chinatown, starting September 3, 2025.

== Reception ==
Andrea Damewood of Willamette Week wrote, "While there are a few stellar representations of Filipino cooking around town, Baon Kainan's casual and boundary-expanding take on the classics fills a slot that's gone unfilled in Portland (and likely the Pacific Northwest)." Michael Russell included the business in The Oregonian's overview of Portland's best new food carts of 2021. Alex Frane included Baon Kainan in Thrillist's 2021 overview of Portland's "must-hit" restaurants. Baon Kainan was named Cart of the Year by Portland Monthly in 2021. The magazine's Katherine Chew Hamilton included the business in a 2022 list of twenty food carts that define the city. In 2024, Nick Woo and Janey Wong included Baon Kainan in Eater Portland's overview of the city's "most outstanding" food carts, and The Infatuation's Krista Garcia also included the business in a list of Portland's best food carts. Baon Kainan was also included in Eater Portland's 2025 lists of Portland's best brunch restaurants and best food carts.

== See also ==
- List of defunct restaurants of the United States
- List of Filipino restaurants
