= Kultura (disambiguation) =

Kultura is a defunct Polish émigré literary journal.

Kultura may also refer to:

- Kultura (newspaper) a Russian newspaper
- Kultura, a Filipiniana store chain in the Philippines
- Kultura, the former name of Russian television channel Russian-K
- Suspilne Kultura, a Ukrainian television channel
- Kultura, a 1994 album by the Ukrainians
- Kultura (restaurant) located in Charleston, South Carolina, United States
- TVP Kultura, a Polish television channel
