= Naides =

Filipino restaurant in San Francisco, California, U.S.

- Interactive map of Naides

Restaurant information
- Rating: (Michelin Guide)
- Location: 708 Bush Street, San Francisco, California, United States
- Coordinates: 37.7903°N 122.4091°W
- Website: restaurantnaides.com

Naides is a Michelin-starred Filipino restaurant in San Francisco, California, United States.

== See also ==
- List of Filipino restaurants
- List of Michelin-starred restaurants in California
