= Helm (restaurant) =

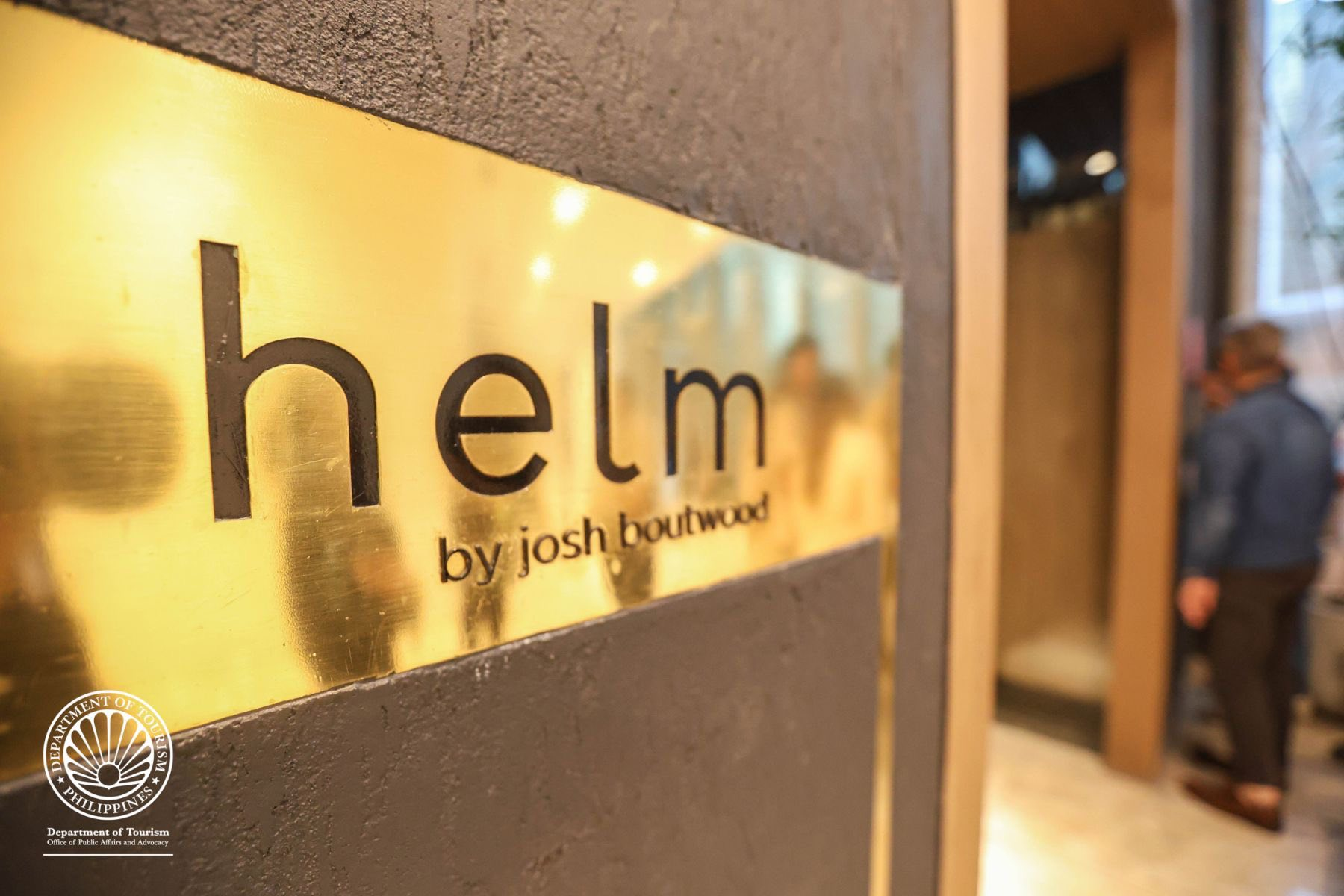
- Interactive map of Helm

Restaurant information
- Established: August 21, 2018; 7 years ago
- Head chef: Josh Boutwood
- Food type: Contemporary, creative cuisine with Filipino, British, and Spanish influences
- Rating: (Michelin Guide)
- Location: Makati Avenue, Makati, Metro Manila, Philippines
- Coordinates: 14°33′28″N 121°1′32″E
- Seating capacity: 24
- Reservations: Required
- Website: joshboutwood.net/restaurants/helm

Helm is a fine-dining restaurant at the Ayala Triangle Gardens in Makati, Metro Manila, founded and led by British-Filipino chef Josh Boutwood. It opened on August 21, 2018, originally as a 10-seat chef's table at the Arya Residences in Bonifacio Global City, Taguig. The restaurant later relocated to a larger 24-seat space at the Ayala Triangle Gardens, which opened in 2023. Helm is known for its multi-course tasting menus served in an intimate setting, and it has garnered international recognition for its innovative cuisine. In 2025, it became the first and only restaurant in the Philippines to be awarded two Michelin stars.

== History ==
Helm debuted on August 21, 2018, in Taguig by Josh Boutwood, who was born in England to a Filipino father and an English mother. He was raised in the United Kingdom and in Boracay, Philippines, until the age of 11, before his family moved to Spain. This upbringing serves as a significant influence for Helm. The restaurant's name suggests being "at the helm", reflecting Boutwood's hands-on leadership in the kitchen.

The initial setup was extremely exclusive—only about ten guests per seating—which created a chef-centric dining experience comparable to an omakase or chef's table concept. In its early years, Helm gained attention for its bold-themed tasting menus, which changed quarterly. These themes could be abstract or whimsical; for example, an "all-monochrome" menu featured courses distinguished only by shades of color, and another menu was inspired by Filipino street fare reinterpreted in fine-dining style.

The restaurant's operations were impacted by the COVID-19 pandemic in 2020, during which time Helm temporarily closed. After a hiatus, Boutwood decided to move the restaurant to a new location in Makati. In April 2023, Helm reopened at the Ayala Triangle Gardens in Makati. The new venue expanded the capacity to 24 seats and introduced a redesigned space while retaining the open-kitchen concept.

== Accolades and awards ==
The restaurant was listed in the Dining 20 list of Tatler in 2023.

In 2024, it was listed by Tatler on their Tatler Dining 20, Best Interior Design, and Tatler Best Asia 100 Restaurants. In 2025, it was listed on the Tatler Best 20 Philippines and Tatler Best 100 Restaurants Asia-Pacific.

Helm became the first restaurant in the Philippines to be awarded two Michelin stars in 2025, when the Michelin Guide published its inaugural Philippines guide.

== See also ==
- List of Filipino restaurants
- List of Michelin-starred restaurants in the Philippines
