= Kasama (restaurant) =

Restaurant in Chicago, Illinois, U.S.

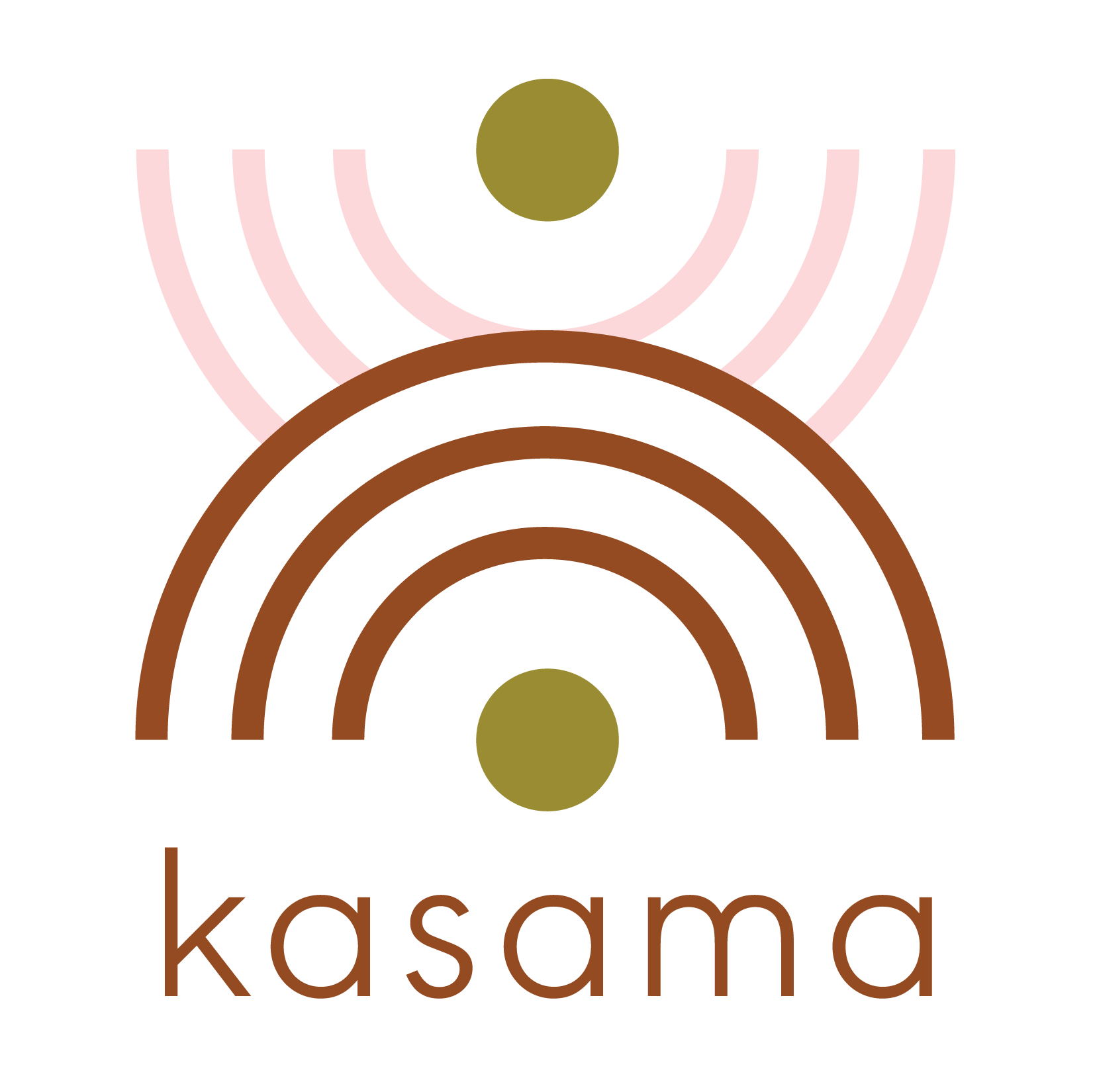

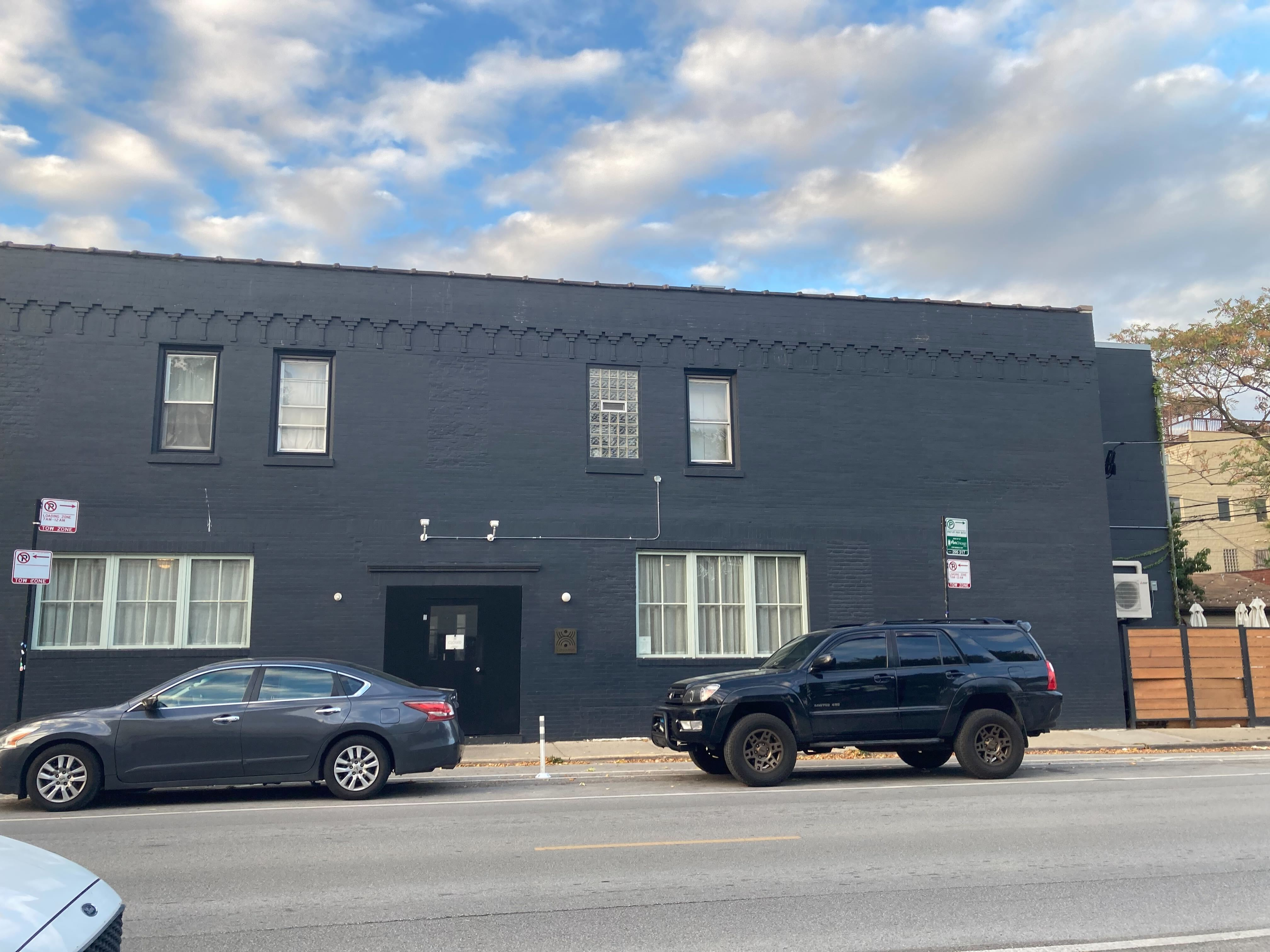
- Interactive map of Kasama

Restaurant information
- Established: July 2020
- Owners: Tim Flores; Genie Kwon
- Chef: Tim Flores; Genie Kwon
- Pastry chef: Genie Kwon
- Food type: Filipino
- Rating: 2 Michelin stars
- Location: 1001 N Winchester Ave, Chicago, Illinois, 60622, United States
- Coordinates: 41°53′59″N 87°40′32.5″W
- Website: kasamachicago.com

Kasama is a Filipino restaurant in Chicago, Illinois. The restaurant has received two Michelin stars, making it the world's first Filipino restaurant to earn one.

== Description ==
The restaurant is located in the Ukrainian Village neighborhood of the West Side of Chicago. The name Kasama comes from the Tagalog word for together. The restaurant serves breakfast, lunch, and dinner. For dinner, it offers a 13-course tasting menu.

== History ==
Kasama is co-owned by husband-and-wife team Tim Flores and Genie Kwon, who serve as chef-owners. Flores stated that their goal was to make Filipino food accessible to people who had never had it before. Their initial concept for the restaurant was a cafe with pastries baked by Kwon in the morning, and lumpia and sandwiches in the afternoon.

The restaurant opened in July 2020 with the initial cafe concept. Later, they began offering a tasting menu at dinner during the COVID-19 pandemic as a response to widespread labor shortages.

The restaurant was featured in the TV series The Bear, which is set in the restaurant scene of Chicago.

== Reception ==
Kasama has been praised by Louise Chu of the Chicago Tribune as "one of the best restaurants in the world." The Michelin Guide initially added Kasama's tasting menu to its Bib Gourmand list in 2021, and then later awarded it a Michelin star in 2022, making it the world's first Filipino restaurant with a star.

Esquire called Kasama one of the best new restaurants in America in 2021. It was nominated for the James Beard Award for best restaurant of 2022. Magazine Robb Report ranked Kasama the third best new restaurant in America in 2022, and named co-owners Tim Flores and Genie Kwon best chefs of the year for their efforts in opening the restaurant during the COVID-19 pandemic.

In 2024, Food & Wine called Kasama the No. 5 restaurant in the U.S.

== See also ==
- List of Filipino restaurants
- List of Michelin-starred restaurants in Chicago
