= Chori burger =

Filipino hamburger made with chorizo patties

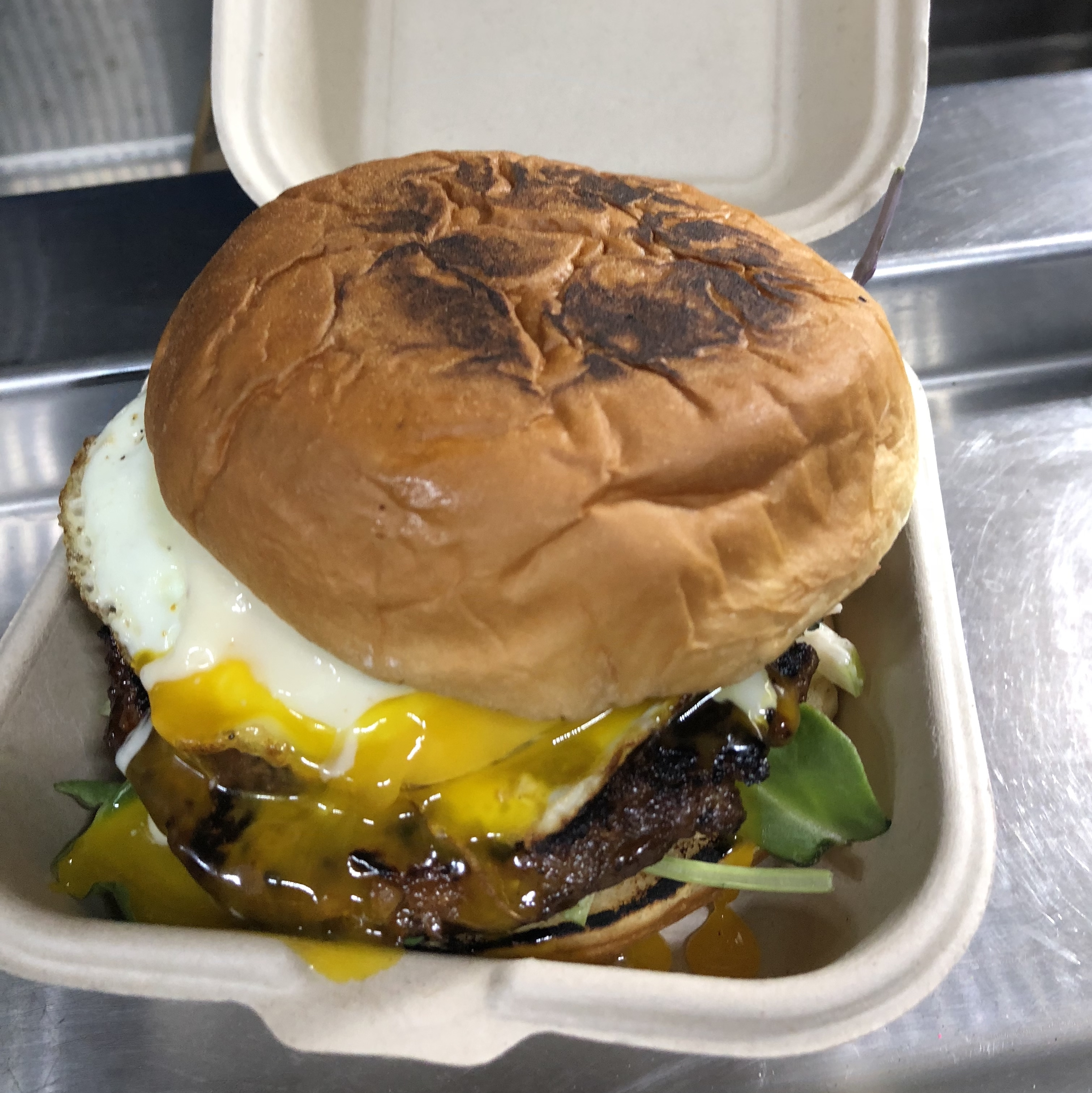
- A chori burger from Spoon & Pork, a Filipino restaurant in Los Angeles
- Alternative names: Chorizo burger
- Course: Main dish
- Place of origin: Philippines
- Region or state: Boracay
- Serving temperature: hot, warm
- Main ingredients: Chorizo, banana ketchup, mayonnaise, and atchara.

A chori burger, also known as a chorizo burger, is a Filipino hamburger characteristically made with chorizo (longganisa) patties, banana ketchup, mayonnaise, and atchara, in addition to tomatoes and lettuce. It was first popularized by Merly's BBQ, a street food stall in the island of Boracay in the Philippines. A version of the burger with a half-longganisa and half-beef patty from Jeepney Restaurant was declared the best burger in New York City in Time Out's 2014 "Battle of the Burgers" competition.

== See also ==
- Coconut burger
- Longganisa
