= BB's (restaurant) =

Filipino restaurant in Toronto, Ontario, Canada

- Interactive map of BB's

Restaurant information
- Owner: Justin Bella
- Head chef: Robbie Hojilla
- Food type: Filipino
- Rating: Bib Gourmand (Michelin Guide)
- Location: 5 Brock Avenue, Toronto, Ontario, Canada
- Coordinates: 43°38′31.3″N 79°25′56.5″W
- Website: www.bbs.restaurant

BB's is a Filipino restaurant in Toronto, Ontario, Canada.

== History ==
The restaurant's name stands for Bahay ni Bella ("Bella's House" in Tagalog), referencing the owner, Justin Bella's, last name. The restaurant originally opened up as BB's Diner in Toronto's Kensington Market neighbourhood located downtown. It closed in July 2020 following the restaurant's building being sold, before re-opening in its current incarnation in Parkdale.

== Concept ==
It is known for its Filipino-influenced brunch offerings, with elements of French and Italian cuisine in its dishes. In 2024, the restaurant began serving kamayan-style dinners, a traditional Filipino communal dining style where food is served on banana leaves and eaten with hands. BB's also offers a Filipino-influenced drinks menu, such as mimosas incorporating calamansi, a citrus fruit native to the Philippines.

== Recognition ==
The business was named a Bib Gourmand restaurant by the Michelin Guide in 2023, and has retained this recognition each year following.

== See also ==
- List of Filipino restaurants
- List of Michelin Bib Gourmand restaurants in Canada
