= List of Michelin-starred restaurants in the Philippines =

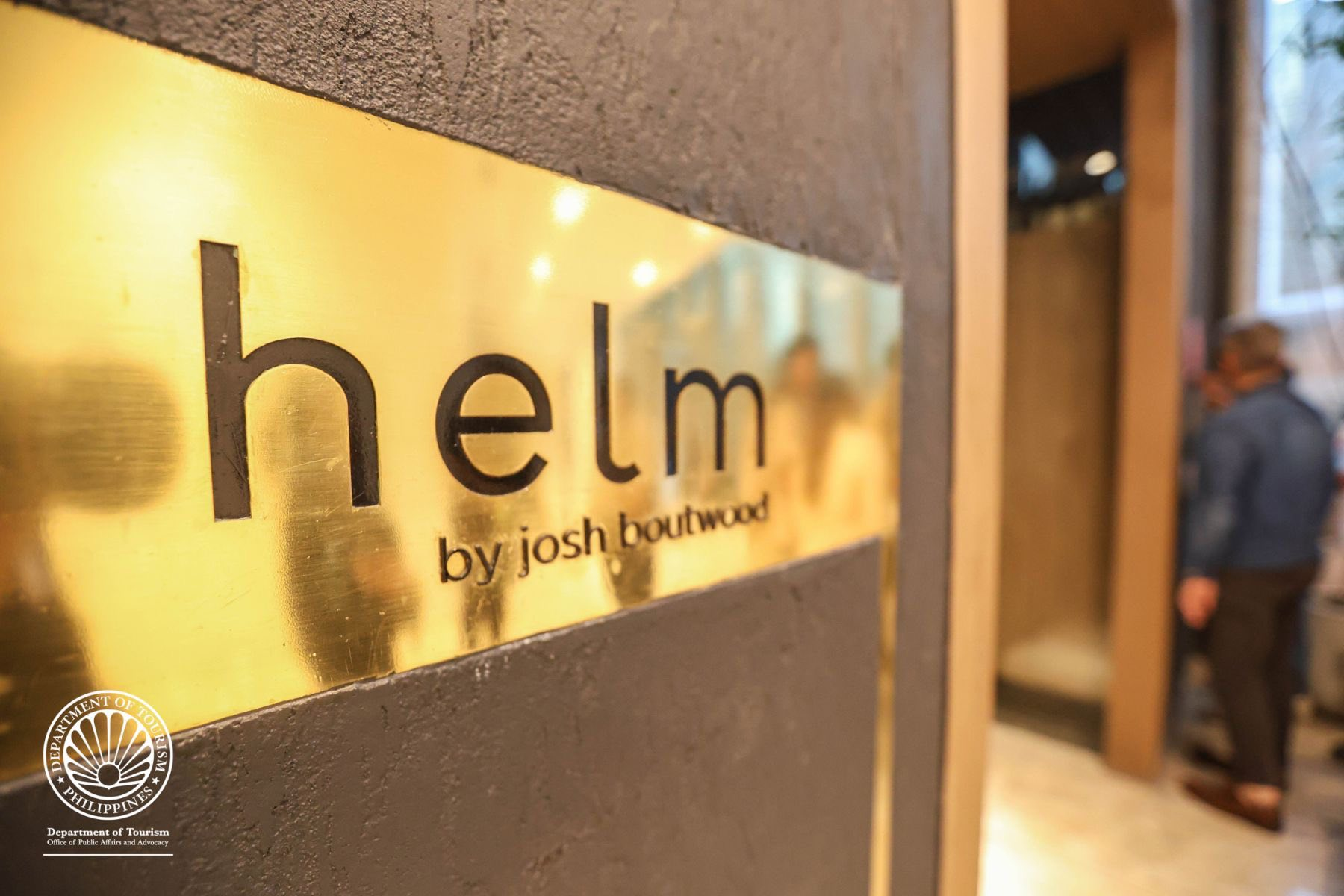
Helm, the first and only two-Michelin-starred restaurant in the Philippines

As of the 2027 Michelin Guide, there are 10 restaurants in the Philippines with a Michelin-star rating.

The Michelin Guides were created by the French tire company Michelin in 1900. Designed as a guide to tell drivers about which eateries they should visit, the guides also sponsored their tires through encouraging drivers to use their cars more and therefore garnering a need to replace the tires as they wore out. Over time, Michelin stars became more valuable.

To rate the restaurants, numerous anonymous Michelin inspectors visit the restaurants several times and rate the restaurants on five criteria: "quality of products", "mastery of flavor and cooking techniques", "the personality of the chef represented in the dining experience", "harmony of flavor", and "consistency between inspectors' visits". Inspectors have at least ten years of expertise and create a list of popular restaurants supported by media reports, reviews, and diner popularity. If the Michelin inspectors who have visited the restaurant reach a consensus, Michelin awards the restaurant from one to three stars. One star means "high-quality cooking, worth a stop", two stars signify "excellent cooking, worth a detour", and three stars denote "exceptional cuisine, worth a special journey". The stars are not permanent, and restaurants are re-evaluated every year. If the criteria are not met, the restaurant will lose its stars.

The inaugural edition of the Michelin Guide in the Philippines was launched in October 2025 at the Manila Marriott Hotel for the year 2026, which covers Manila and other cities in the area, and Cebu City. The Philippines became the fifth country in Southeast Asia to have a Michelin Guide. Only restaurants in Metro Manila and Cavite have received stars. There are currently nine restaurants in the Philippines with a Michelin-star rating, one having two stars and the rest having one. Another restaurant gained a green star, indicating sustainability. The introduction of the Michelin Guide in the Philippines was welcomed by the Department of Tourism (DOT) and its secretary Christina Frasco. In November 2025, the DOT and Michelin sought a permanent partnership.

== List ==
Key
1 Michelin star	One Michelin star
2 Michelin stars	Two Michelin stars
—	The restaurant did not receive a star that year

Michelin-starred restaurants
Name	Cuisine	Location	2026	2027
Asador Alfonso	Spanish contemporary	Cavite – Alfonso	1 Michelin star	1 Michelin star
Celera	Asian contemporary	Metro Manila – Makati	1 Michelin star	1 Michelin star
Flow	Creative	Metro Manila – Makati	—	1 Michelin star
Gallery by Chele	Creative	Metro Manila – Taguig	1 Michelin star	1 Michelin star
Hapag	Filipino	Metro Manila – Makati	1 Michelin star	1 Michelin star
Helm	Creative	Metro Manila – Makati	2 Michelin stars	2 Michelin stars
Inatô	Filipino	Metro Manila – Makati	1 Michelin star	1 Michelin star
Kása Palma	Filipino	Metro Manila – Makati	1 Michelin star	1 Michelin star
Linamnam	Filipino	Metro Manila – Parañaque	1 Michelin star	1 Michelin star
Toyo Eatery	Filipino	Metro Manila – Makati	1 Michelin star	1 Michelin star
Reference				

== See also ==
- List of Michelin Bib Gourmand restaurants in the Philippines
