= Fubonn Shopping Center =

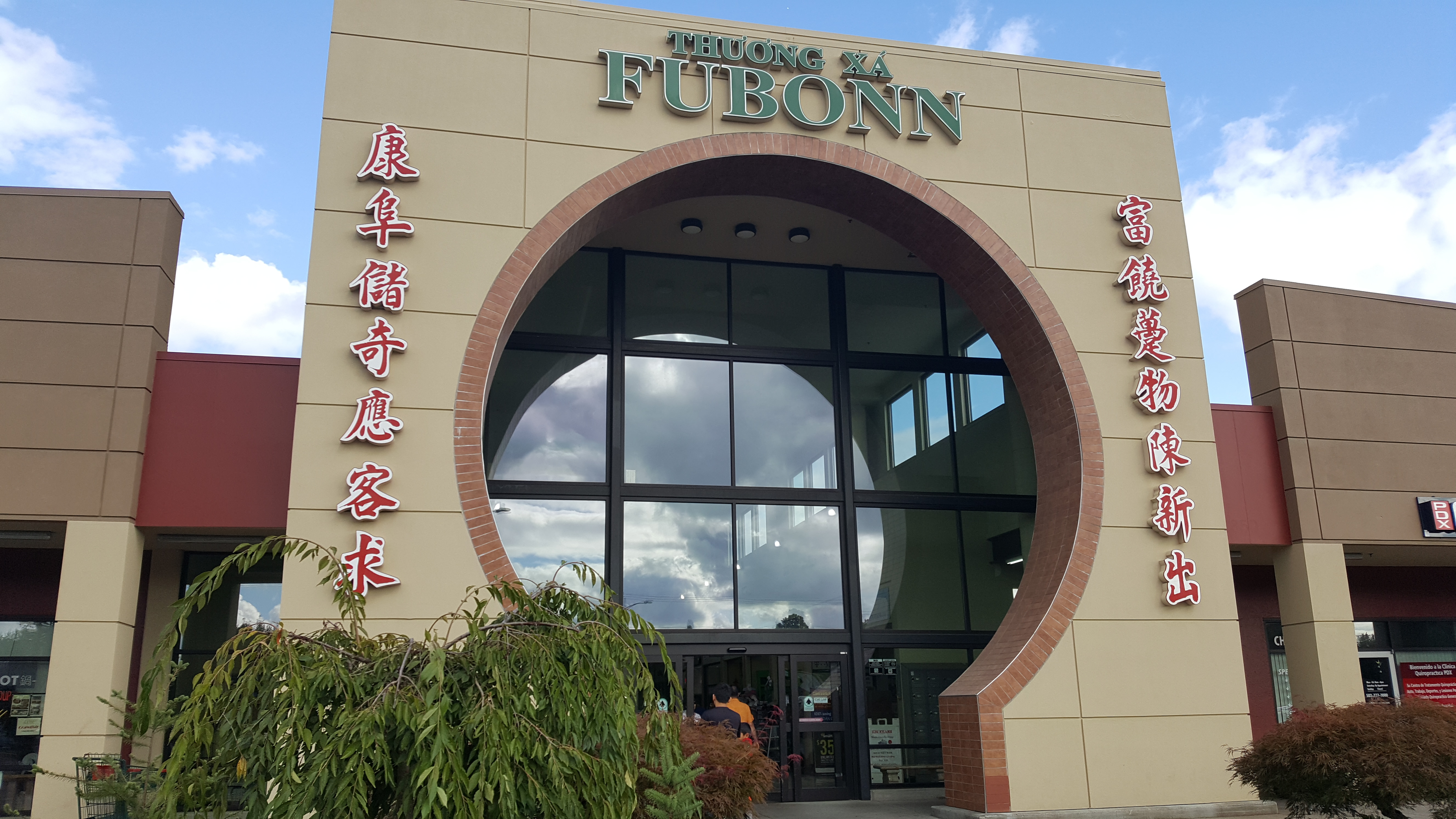
- Front entrance of primary building
- Location: Portland, Oregon, U.S.
- Coordinates: 45.501°N 122.577°W
- Opened: 2006
- Developer: Michael Liu
- Num. of stores: 29
- Num. of anchor tenants: 1
- Floors: 1
- Website: fubonn.com

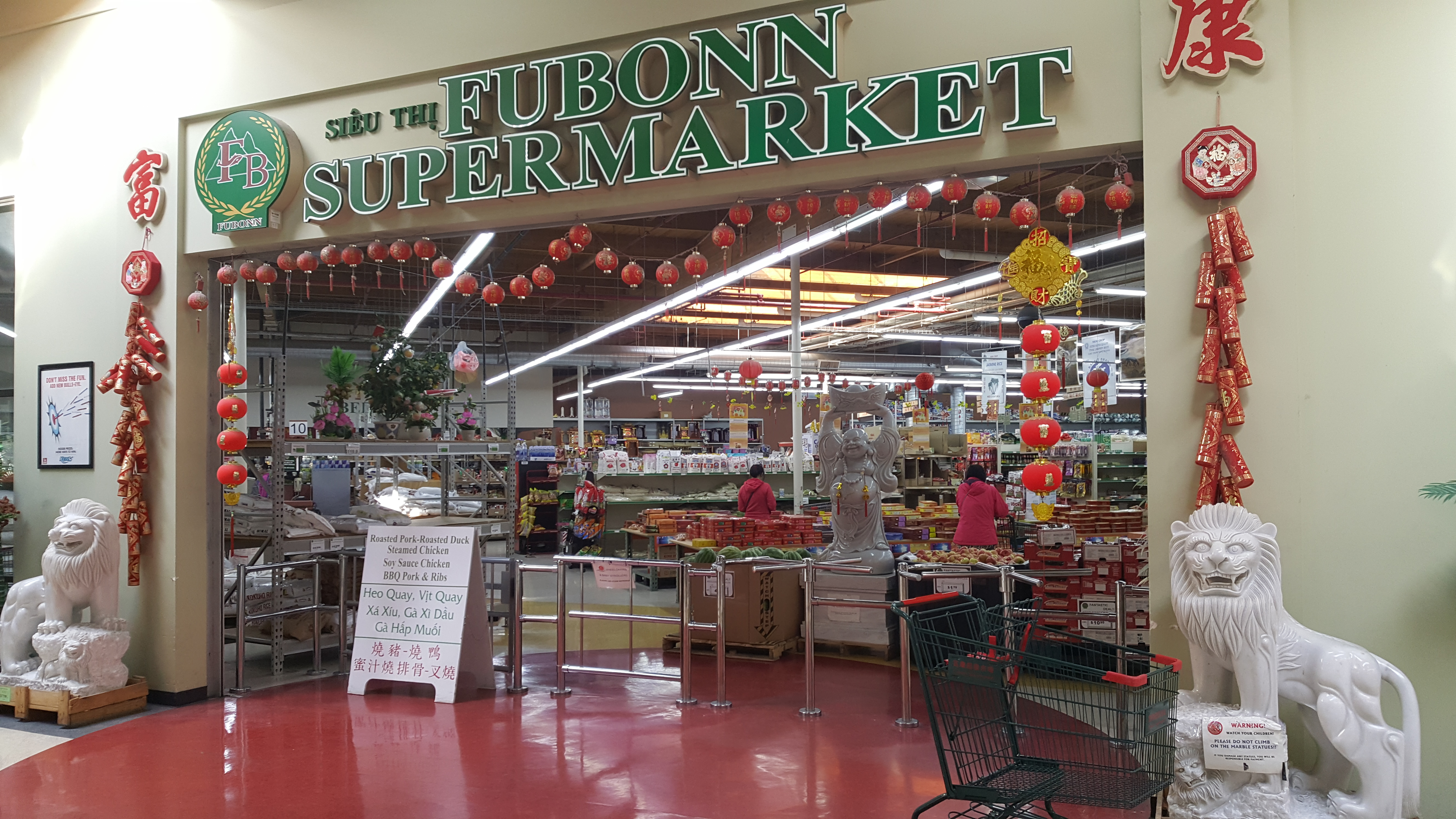
Interior entrance, 2018

The Fubonn Shopping Center is an enclosed shopping mall in the Powellhurst-Gilbert neighborhood of Portland, Oregon, in the United States. The mall claims to be the largest Asian mall in Oregon and lists 29 stores as tenants in November 2011. The mall is located at SE 82nd Avenue and SE Woodward Street. It is anchored by the Fubonn Supermarket, a large Asian grocery and housewares store. The Oregonian calls it "the eastside's answer to Uwajimaya".

== Description and history ==
The mall was opened in 2006 by owner, President and CEO Michael Liu. Construction cost a reported $15 million.

Fubonn's opening on SE 82nd Avenue coincided with an alleged and controversial move by Portland's Chinese business and residential communities from the Old Town area in downtown to the SE 82nd area. Liu said that availability of parking was a factor in choosing a location away from Chinatown. Fubonn has been the site of multiple media appearances by public officials calling for action against drug and sex crime, as those conditions have long characterized the SE 82nd Avenue area.

Popular highlights of the Fubonn Shopping Center include the large variety of produce at the Fubonn Supermarket and the So Kong Dong Tofu & BBQ restaurant. Also in the Shopping Center are a marble statuary, a tea shop, and many small shops selling books and movies from China, Vietnam, and elsewhere.

== See also ==
- Balong
- List of shopping malls in Oregon
