= Neng Jr.'s =

Restaurant in Asheville, North Carolina, U.S.

- Interactive map of Neng Jr.'s

Restaurant information
- Food type: Filipino
- Location: 701 Haywood Road, Asheville, North Carolina, 28806, United States
- Coordinates: 35°34′39.9″N 82°35′30.8″W

Neng Jr.'s is a Filipino restaurant in Asheville, North Carolina founded, owned, and operated by Silver Iocovozzi. Established in June 2022, the business was included in The New York Times's 2023 list of the 50 best restaurants in the United States.

== See also ==
- List of Filipino restaurants
