= Melissa Miranda =

American chef and restaurateur

- Education: University of Washington
- Culinary career
- Current restaurant: Musang
- Award won: Food and Wine Magazine's 2022 Best New Chefs

Melissa Miranda is an American chef and restaurateur. Miranda was named one of Food and Wine Magazine's 2022 Best New Chefs and is a 2023 James Beard Award semifinalist. She is the founder of Musang, a Filipino restaurant located in Seattle's Beacon Hill neighborhood.

== Early life ==
As a child, Miranda recalls her father's passion for food, as well as watching her grandmother cook, both of which served as moments of inspiration for her career as a chef.

Miranda studied at the University of Washington, graduating in 2007 with a degree in sociology. As a student, Miranda began working front of house in restaurants to earn some extra money. Following her graduation, Miranda worked at Nordstrom in fashion management, eventually moving to Italy. She attended culinary school in Florence and cooked at restaurants in New York City before moving back to Seattle.

== Career ==
In 2016, Miranda founded Musang as a pop-up. Miranda named the restaurant after her father's nickname, meaning "wildcat' in Tagalog, which was given to him because he drove a Mustang. She got funding to start a brick-and-mortar restaurant via Kickstarter, raising a total of $91,000. The restaurant opened in early 2020. Miranda appeared on Marcus Samuelsson's PBS show "No Passport Required" at the start of 2020. In March 2020, Miranda shut down the restaurant as the COVID pandemic hit, eventually pivoting to create a community kitchen. Eventually, she reopened the restaurant.

In her restaurants and her publications, Miranda focuses on combining classic Filipino flavors with locally sourced, seasonal produce. At Musang, she focuses on educating the public about Filipino food through the restaurant's menu. She also founded the Musang Little Wildcats program, a Filipino food education initiative for kids. She also starred in multiple videos for Bon Appetit Magazine and published six recipes on their website.

In 2022, Miranda was named one of Food and Wine Magazine's Best New Chefs. Furthermore, in January 2023, Miranda was named a James Beard Award semifinalist.

As of 2023, Miranda is working on opening Kilig in Seattle's International District, which will serve bulalo and pancit.
