= Oriental Mart =

Restaurant in Seattle, Washington, U.S.

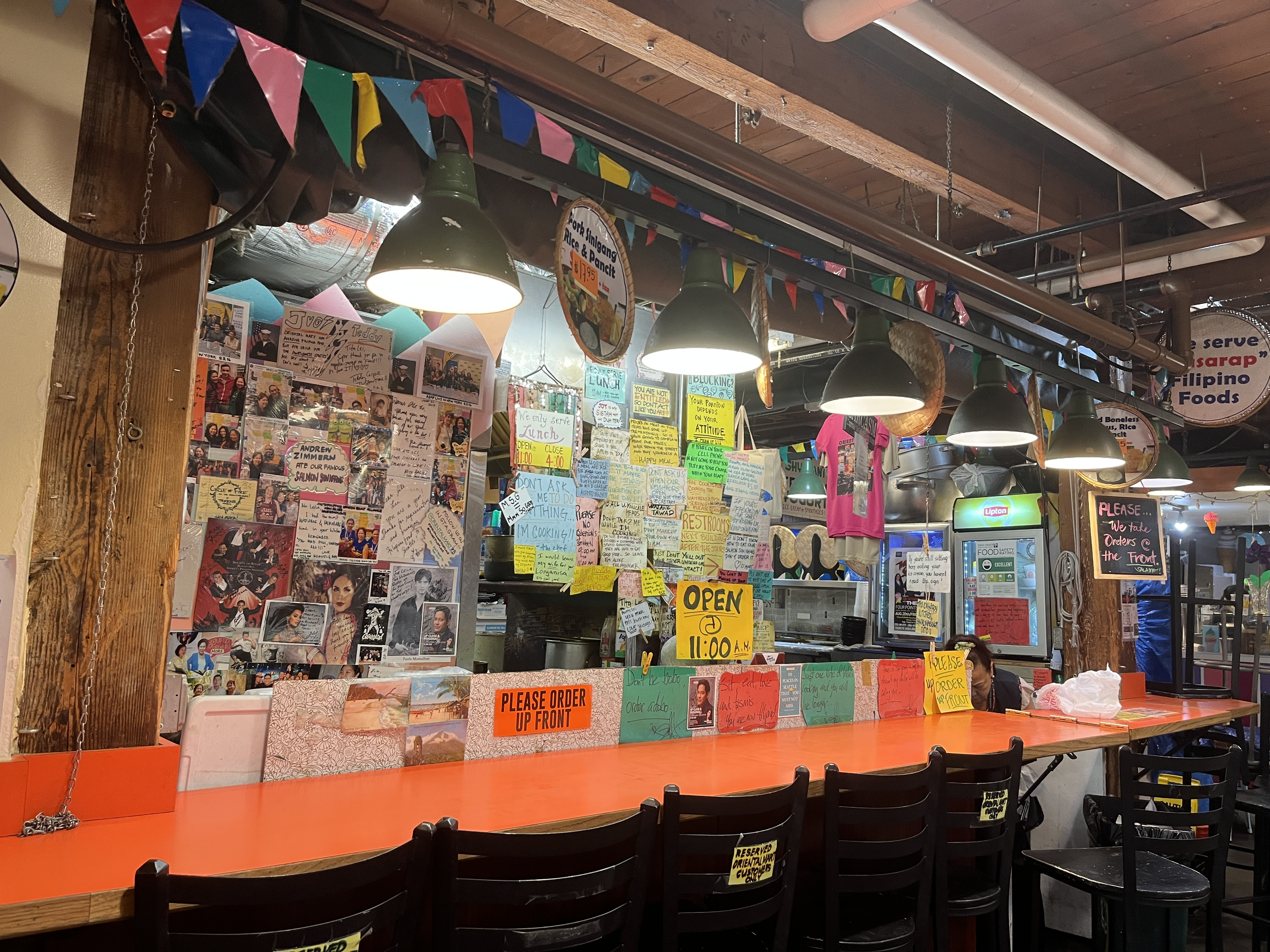
- 2022
- Interactive map of Oriental Mart

Restaurant information
- Location: 1506 Pike Street Suite 509, Seattle, Washington, 98101, United States
- Coordinates: 47°36′32.2″N 122°20′26.5″W

Oriental Mart is a Filipino restaurant in Seattle's Pike Place Market, in the U.S. state of Washington. In 2020, the business received an 'America's Classics' award the James Beard Foundation.

== Description ==
Oriental Mart operates in Pike Place Market's Corner Market building. The menu changes daily and has included pork adobo, longanisa sausage with rice and pancit noodles, and salmon sinigang.

== See also ==
- List of Filipino restaurants
- List of restaurants in Pike Place Market
