= Ludi's =

Filipino restaurant in Seattle, Washington, U.S.

- Interactive map of Ludi's

Restaurant information
- Food type: Filipino
- Location: 120 Stewart Street, Seattle, King, Washington, United States
- Coordinates: 47°36′40″N 122°20′27″W
- Website: ludisrestaurantwa.com

Ludi's Restaurant & Lounge, or simply Ludi's, is a Filipino restaurant in Seattle, Washington, United States.

== Description ==
Ludi's has been described as a diner.

== History ==
Ludi's has operated in various locations since the 1930s. It currently operates at the intersection of Second Avenue and Stewart. Previously, the restaurant was on the 200 block of Pike Street.

== Reception ==
Ludi's ranked number 25 in Yelp's list of the nation's top 100 restaurants for 2026.

== See also ==
- List of diners
- List of Filipino restaurants
