= Lord Maynard Llera =

Filipino-American chef

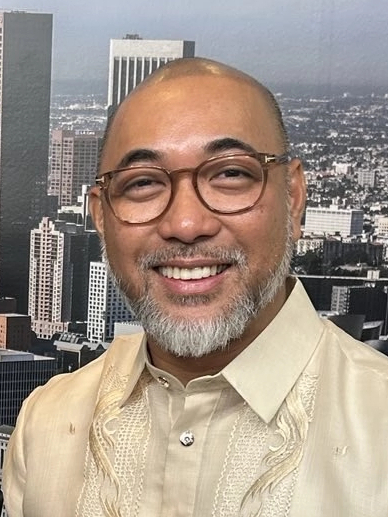
- Llera in 2024
- Born: Lucena, Quezon, Philippines
- Education: The Culinary Institute of America
- Alma mater: San Sebastian College – Recoletos (BSBA)
- Years active: 2004–present
- Spouse: Gigi Regudo-Llera (m. 2001)
- Children: 2
- Culinary career
- Current restaurant: Kuya Lord
- Previous restaurants: Bestia (2013–2017); H.wood Group (2017–2019)
- Award won: James Beard Foundation Award (2024)
- Website: kuyalord.com

Lord Maynard Llera is a Filipino-born American chef. He owns the restaurant Kuya Lord in Los Angeles, which won the James Beard Foundation Award for Best Chef: California in 2024. After moving to the United States in 2004, he studied culinary arts at the Culinary Institute of America, graduating two years later. He then moved to Los Angeles and worked in various restaurants. Llera started Kuya Lord in 2019 as a street food pop-up, later opening a physical restaurant in East Hollywood, Los Angeles in 2022.

== Early life and education ==
Lord Maynard Llera was born and raised in Lucena, Quezon, Philippines. His parents traveled to festivals to sell their wares to storefronts and resorts, and he admired them. He attended San Sebastian College – Recoletos, graduating with a bachelor's degree in business administration, but felt directionless. He immigrated from the Philippines to the United States in 2004 to study culinary arts with the goal of opening a restaurant. During this time, he worked as a fry cook and mascot for Jollibee in Norwalk, California. He attended The Culinary Institute of America in Hyde Park, New York, graduating in 2006.

== Cooking career ==
After graduating and moving to Los Angeles, he worked at various restaurants. He served as opening sous chef at Bestia, working with Ori Menashe and Genevieve Gergis for four years. In 2017, he became culinary director of the H.wood Group, a position he held until 2019. He earned the nickname "Kuya Lord," which stuck as his moniker when he launched his own restaurant venture.

In 2019, Llera started selling his food under the name Kuya Lord at a street food pop-up at Tabula Rasa Bar on Hollywood Boulevard. His subsequent pop-ups at wine bars, breweries, food events, and private dining rooms helped introduce Filipino cuisine to non-Filipinos. When the COVID-19 pandemic in California occurred, he focused on research and development for his upcoming projects, converting his La Cañada Flintridge house garage and backyard into a full kitchen and grill. He and his wife Gigi cooked for friends, relatives, and followers, and through word of mouth, customers began visiting weekly. As a result, he opened his restaurant in 2022 in East Hollywood, Los Angeles on Melrose Avenue.

In January 2024, the James Beard Foundation announced its nominees for its awards, being later selected as one of two California finalists, along with Gusto Bread in Long Beach. By June, his restaurant won the award for Best Chef: California, the only award Los Angeles received that year. Kuya Lord also received many accolades, including being named to the Los Angeles Times "101 Best Restaurants" list, Bon Appétit's "24 Best New Restaurants" list, and Eater's "Best Filipino Restaurants in Los Angeles."

== Personal life ==
Llera is married to Gigi Regudo-Llera, whom he credits with helping him support and encourage the restaurant. He has two children.
