= Hood Famous =

Bakery in Seattle, Washington, U.S.

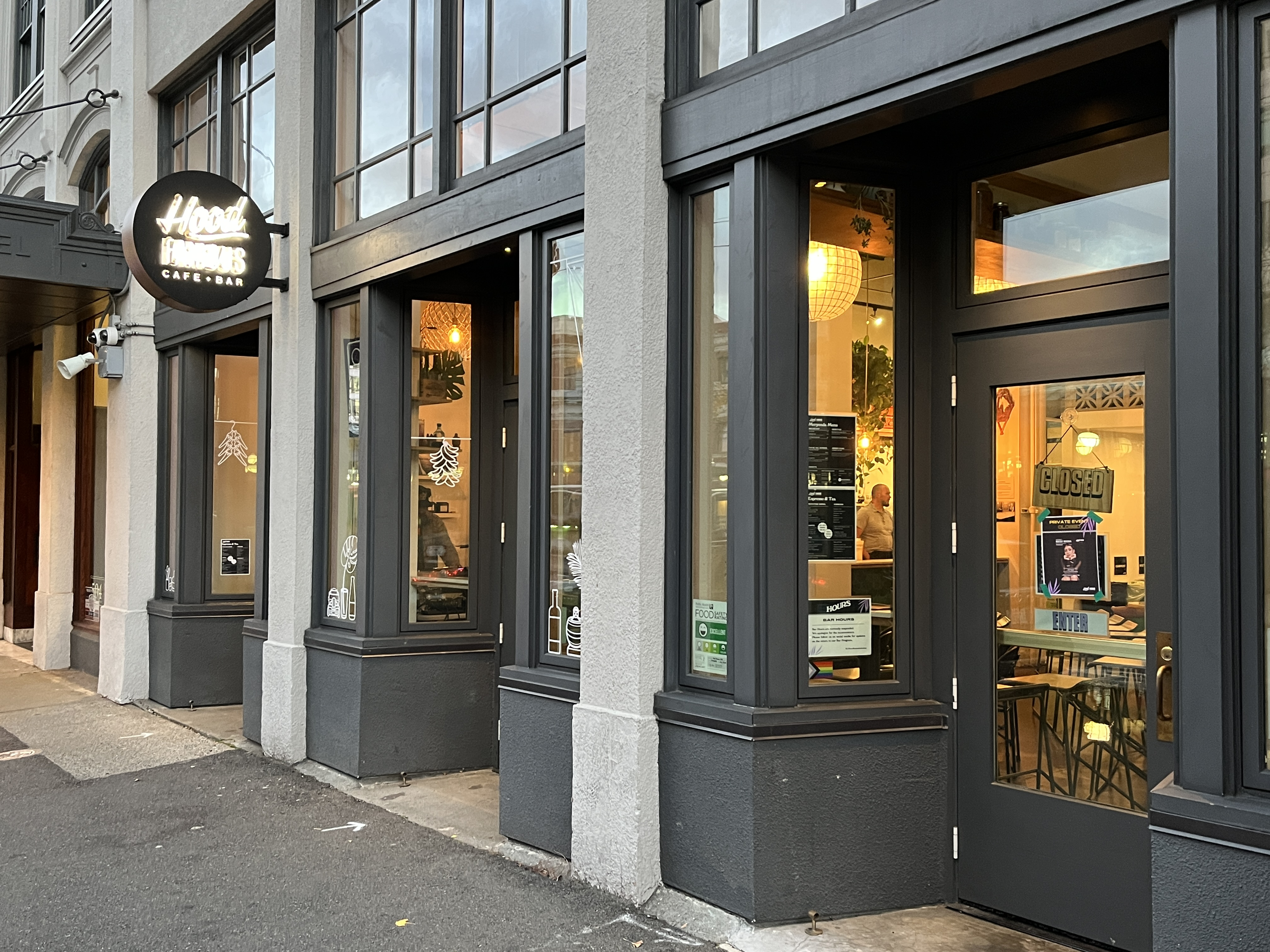
- Exterior of the restaurant in Seattle's Chinatown-International District, 2022

Restaurant information
- Owners: Chera Amlag; Geo Quibuyen
- Food type: Filipino
- Location: Seattle, Washington, United States
- Website: hoodfamousbakeshop.com

Hood Famous Cafe and Bar, also known as Hood Famous Bakeshop or simply Hood Famous, is a Filipino bakery with two locations in Seattle, in the U.S. state of Washington. Operating in Ballard and the Chinatown–International District (C-ID), the business is co-owned by spouses Chera Amlag and Geo Quibuyen of Blue Scholars (also known as Prometheus Brown).

== Description ==
Hood Famous is an Asian Pacific American- and woman-owned business in Seattle specializing in Filipino cuisine. The menu has included ube (purple yam) cheesecake and cookies, buko pie, calamansi bars, cassava cake, longanisa chive scones, ensaymada (Filipino brioche bun with cheese), pandesal, pandan flan, and other desserts and pastries. The business also serves arroz caldo, beef mechado pot pie, and coffee. Cocktails include calamansi sours and ube daiquiris. For Thanksgiving, the C-ID location has served gluten-free pumpkin cake with pinipig and oat streusel.

== History ==
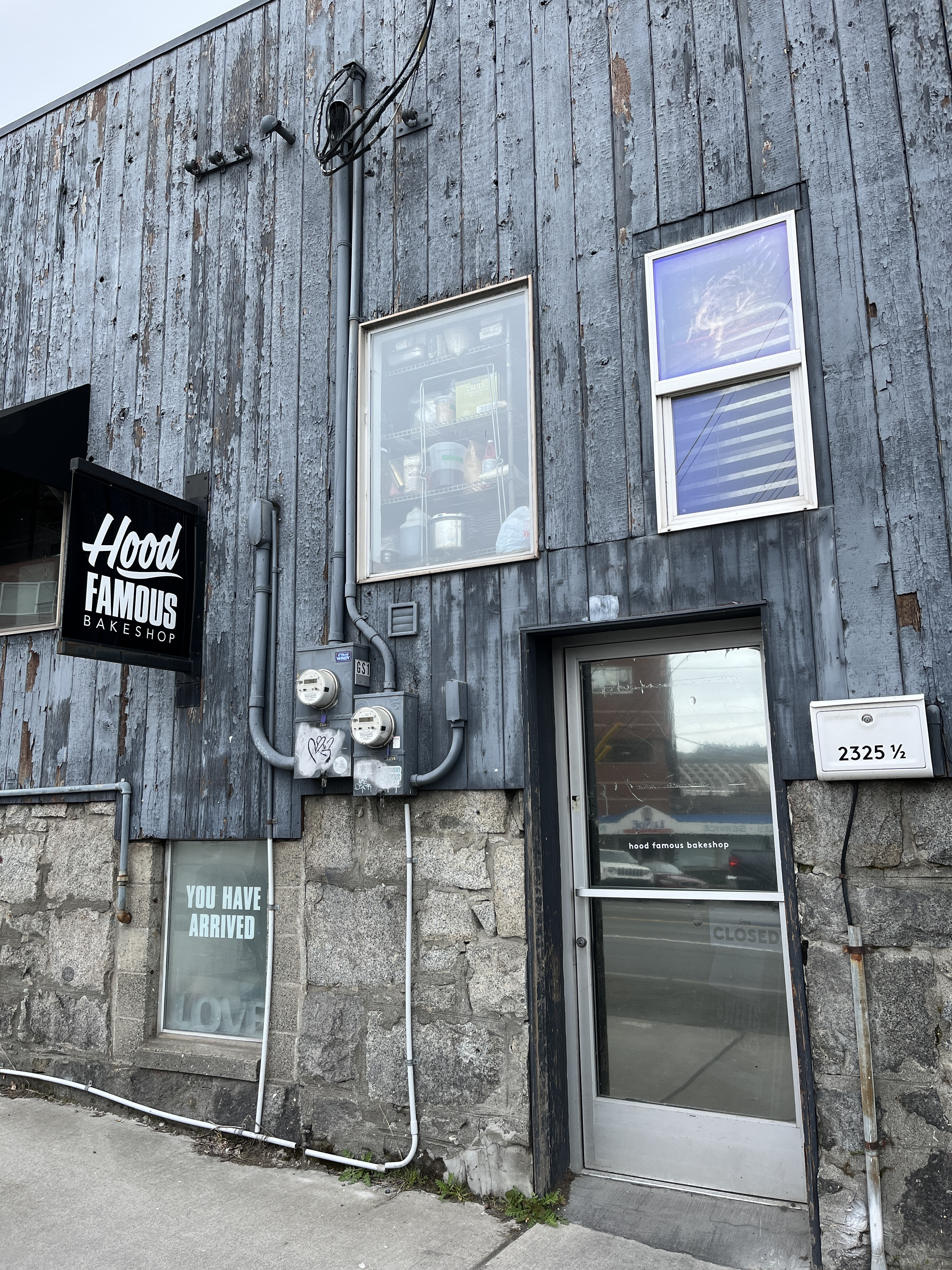
Exterior of Hood Famous in Ballard, Seattle, 2023

Chera Amlag founded the business and began wholesaling to Uwajimaya in 2014. She opened a first storefront in 2016. The C-ID location opened in 2019. The business also launched an apparel line in 2019. Janelle Quiyuben was creative director of Hood Famous until 2021.

== Reception ==
In 2020 the restaurant appeared on Marcus Samuelsson's PBS show "No Passport Required." Later that year, Hood Famous earned Amlag a James Beard Foundation semifinalist nomination.

Rachel Hopke included Hood Famous in Eater Seattle's 2021 list of eight "sensational shops" in Seattle for cold brew. The website's Gabe Guarente and Jade Yamazaki Stewart included the business in a 2022 overview of "Where to Find Fantastic Filipino Food Around the Seattle Area". Aleenah Ansari included Hood Famous in Insider.com's 2022 list of "12 restaurants you shouldn't miss in Seattle, according to a local who has eaten their way around the city."

Hood Famous was included in The Infatuation's 2025 list of the 25 best restaurants in the Chinatown–International District.

== See also ==
- Filipino-American cuisine
- List of Filipino restaurants
- List of restaurant chains in the United States
