= Spoon & Pork =

Filipino restaurant in Los Angeles, California, U.S.

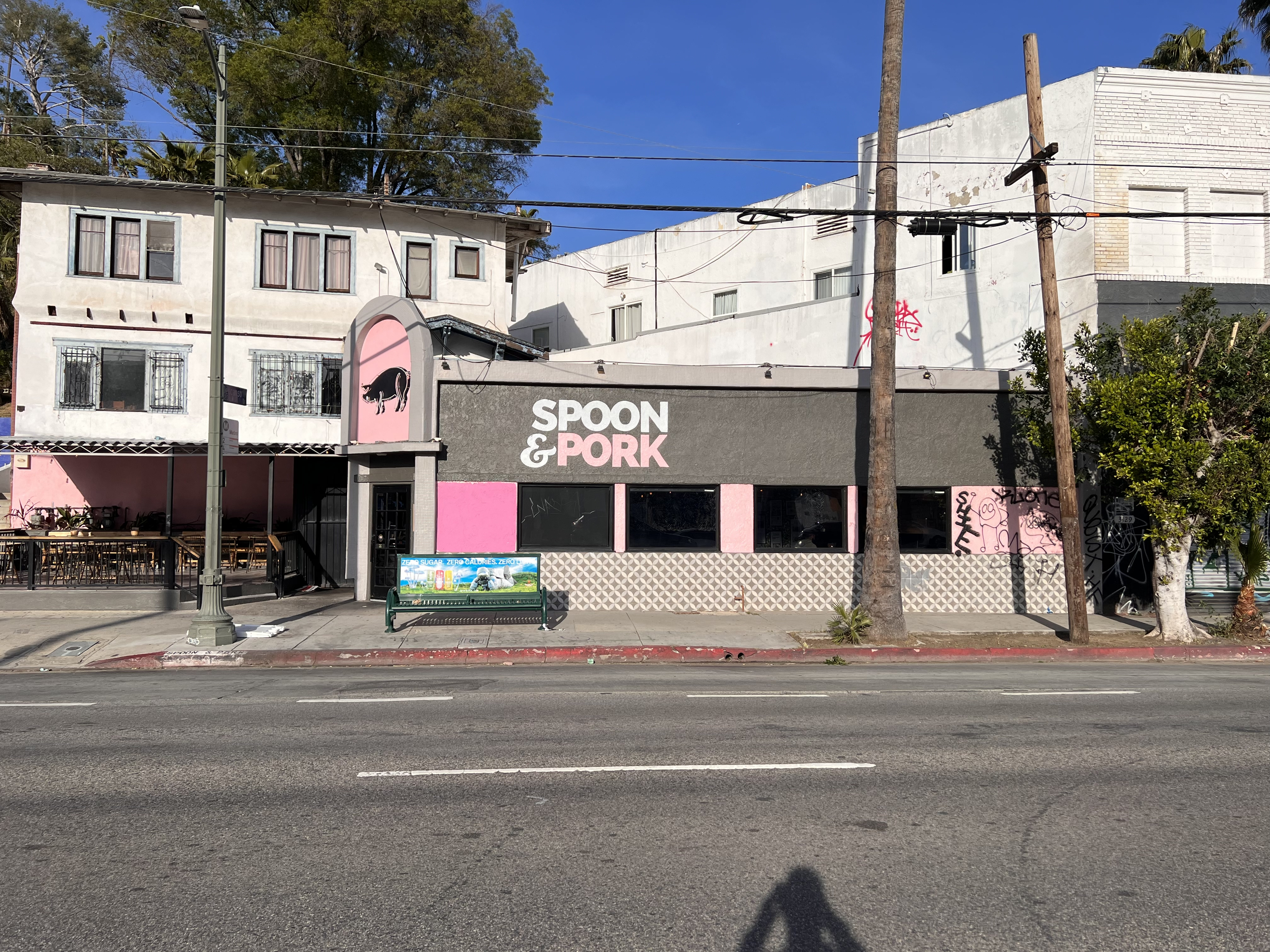
- Interactive map of Spoon & Pork

Restaurant information
- Established: 2017
- Closed: October 27, 2025; 8 months ago
- Owners: Ray Yaptinchay, Jay Tugas
- Food type: Filipino
- Dress code: Casual
- Location: 3131 Sunset Boulevard, Los Angeles, California, 90026, United States
- Coordinates: 34°5′7.32″N 118°16′28.55″W
- Website: www.spoonandpork.com

Spoon & Pork was a restaurant specializing in Filipino cuisine. First opened as a food truck in 2017, its main location was located at 3131 Sunset Boulevard in the Silver Lake neighborhood of Los Angeles.

== History ==
Spoon & Pork was opened in April 2017 by Ray Yaptinchay and Jay Tugas, childhood friends from the Philippines who both later moved to the United States. Initially launching as a food truck, neither Yaptinchay nor Tugas had any experience in the restaurant industry when they first opened.

In late 2018, after developing a loyal following and looking to expand, the restaurant announced that would open a permanent location in Silver Lake, which would largely serve the same menu as the food truck. Initially scheduled to open in February 2019, the permanent location opened in July of that year, and a second branch of Spoon & Pork opened on 2121 Sawtelle Boulevard in the Sawtelle neighborhood in October 2021.

Despite its success, by 2025 Spoon & Pork was struggling to stay open due to high prices amidst a cost-of-living crisis that had led to several other restaurants in Los Angeles closing. Both locations closed shortly thereafter, with the Sawtelle location closing in August 2025, and the Silver Lake location closing in October with Yaptinchay and Tugas repurposing the property to set up a new taco restaurant, Onda.

== Location and concept ==
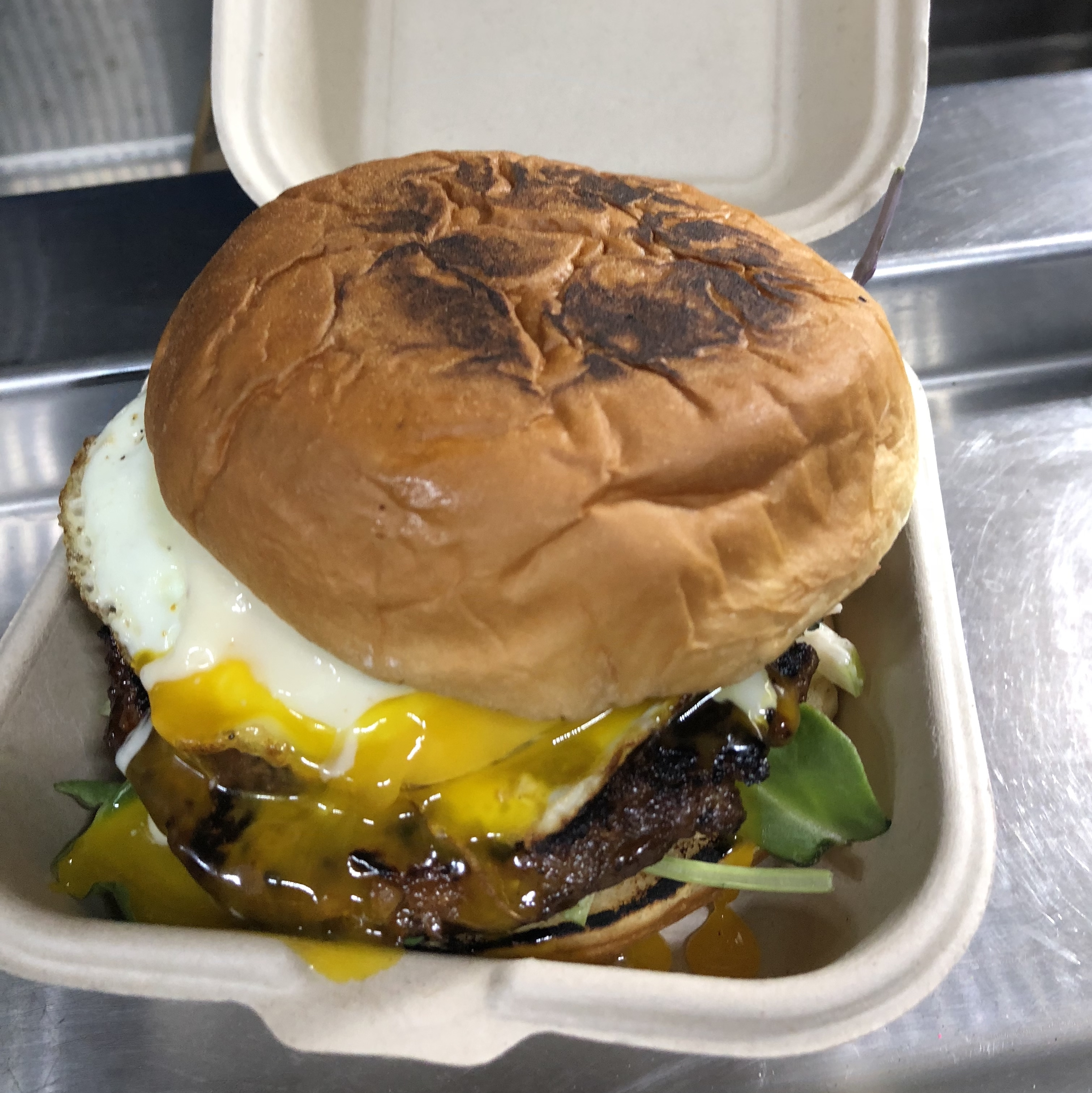
A Spoon & Pork chori burger

Spoon & Pork's main Silver Lake branch occupied a 1,300-square-foot (120 m^{2}) space along Sunset Boulevard which also includes a modestly-sized minimalist dining room, modern in design with tropical-themed walls, and an outdoor patio space slightly detached from the rest of the street. In addition to its in-house operation, the restaurant is also a fixture at Smorgasburg's Los Angeles iteration.

The restaurant's space was in a building that is shared with Diablo Tacos, a prominent Silver Lake taco restaurant. The building, owned by nightclub owner Steve Edelson, also previously hosted long-time Mexican restaurant La Parrilla, which closed in October 2011.

Spoon & Pork's menu, with both Yaptinchay and Tugas equally sharing cooking duties at the restaurant, had been described as being "modern Filipino comfort food", informed by the owners' love of cooking at home despite their lack of formal culinary training. Pork cooked in various ways dominated the restaurant's offerings, which included takes on lechon kawali (served as an appetizer) and the chori burger. Its signature dish, the patita, was the restaurant's take on crispy pata and was large enough for up to three people, served with a sweet chili and garlic sauce. Braised for up to 15 hours and subsequently air-dried for an additional 24 hours before being put in the fryer, and originally served with a popsicle stick as a means of eating the dish, the patita had been described as being rich and flavorful, and had been instrumental in building its following.

Although it primarily served pork, Spoon & Pork also served other meats, as well as vegan dishes, which included a jackfruit dish that was named by The New York Times as one of its top ten dishes in Los Angeles for 2019.

=== Awards and accolades ===
Spoon & Pork had been identified by the Los Angeles Times as part of a growing number of Los Angeles-based modern Filipino restaurants, helping raise the profile of Filipino cuisine both in the city and nationally. A few months after opening in 2017, LA Weekly readers named it the best food truck in Los Angeles, When they opened in 2019 they received a glowing review in the Los Angeles Times stating that the Patita might be the best pork dish in the city. The New York Times and Los Angeles Times named the Coco Jack and Patita as one of its top 10 dishes in Los Angeles. In 2020, the Los Angeles Times named it as one of the city's 101 best restaurants for that year. Also on that year they were named the Chefs to Watch by Plate Magazine. In 2021 it was listed for the first time in the California edition of the Michelin Guide, the only Filipino restaurant listed in Southern California.

== See also ==
- List of Filipino restaurants
