= Kuya Lord =

Filipino restaurant in Los Angeles, California, U.S.

- Interactive map of Kuya Lord

Restaurant information
- Established: 2022
- Owner: Lord Maynard Llera
- Food type: Filipino
- Dress code: Casual
- Location: 5003 Melrose Avenue, Los Angeles, California, United States
- Coordinates: 34°5′0.67″N 118°18′34.2″W
- Website: www.kuyalord.com

Kuya Lord is a restaurant in Los Angeles, California specializing in Filipino cuisine. Opened in 2022, it is located at 5003 Melrose Avenue in the southeast corner of Hollywood, close to the intersection with Western Avenue and the border with the adjacent Melrose Hill, Larchmont and Wilshire Center neighborhoods.

== History ==
Kuya Lord first began as a pop-up restaurant in 2020, operating from the home kitchen of local chef Lord Maynard Llera in La Cañada Flintridge during the COVID-19 pandemic. Llera initially operated the pop-up on weekends as a research and development project for a future permanent restaurant, in planning for over 20 years and which he hoped to open once the pandemic, which had severely affected the restaurant industry, subsided.

In May 2022, Llera announced that he had secured a space along Melrose Avenue to open his restaurant, sharing a building with other restaurants where the landlord was keen to expand the local community's access to varied dining options. Kuya Lord then opened the following month.

Two years later, Llera was awarded a James Beard Foundation Award for his restaurant, being named best chef in California in the award's 2024 edition.

== Location and concept ==
A plate of lucenachon, Kuya Lord's signature dish

Kuya Lord occupies a small space, initially with a seating capacity of 18 persons, but since expanded to 28. Diners eating at the restaurant sit on repurposed wooden tables best suited for communal meals. The restaurant also employs an open kitchen concept where diners can see their meals being prepared in the open, while a corner hosts various restaurant merchandise and condiments like chili crisp available for purchase.

The restaurant's menu is inspired by Llera's upbringing in Lucena, Quezon, reinterpreting and enhancing his favorite dishes using classic cooking techniques. Various rice bowls dominate the restaurant's offerings, although Kuya Lord also serves sharing trays which includes dishes such as pancit and chicken inasal. Llera's take on lechon and porchetta, called the lucenachon, is the restaurant's signature dish.

=== Awards and accolades ===
Since its opening, Kuya Lord has been included in various best restaurant lists. The Infatuation included Kuya Lord in its list of best new restaurants in Los Angeles for 2022, while Bon Appétit named it in 2023 as one of its 24 best new restaurants in the United States. The Los Angeles Times, meanwhile, has included the restaurant in its list of the 101 best restaurants in Los Angeles in 2022, 2023, 2024, and 2025. In 2025, Time Out Los Angeles also named Kuya Lord as the city's best Filipino restaurant, being the only one listed to receive five stars, and in 2026 the singer H.E.R., who is of Filipino descent, named Kuya Lord as her favorite Filipino restaurant in Los Angeles.

== See also ==
- List of Filipino restaurants
