= The Chicken Supply =

Restaurant in Seattle, Washington, U.S.

- Interactive map of The Chicken Supply

Restaurant information
- Owners: Paolo Campbell; Donnie Adams
- Chef: Paolo Campbell
- Food type: Filipino
- Location: 7410 Greenwood Avenue North, Seattle, King, Washington, 98103, United States
- Coordinates: 47.6829°N 122.3550°W

The Chicken Supply is a fried chicken restaurant in Seattle's Phinney Ridge neighborhood, in the U.S. state of Washington.

== Description ==
The restaurant specializes in Filipino fried chicken.

== History ==
The Chicken Supply is co-owned by chef Paolo Campbell and Donnie Adams.

== Reception ==
In 2023, The Chicken Supply was included in The New York Times' list of Seattle's 25 best restaurants.

== See also ==
- List of chicken restaurants
- List of Filipino restaurants
