= Gerry's Grill =

Filipino restaurant chain

Gerry's Restaurant and Bar
- Company type: Public
- Industry: Restaurants
- Founded: February 14, 1997; 29 years ago in Quezon City, Philippines
- Founder: Gerry Apolinario
- Headquarters: Quezon City, Philippines
- Number of locations: 117
- Area served: Philippines; Singapore; United States; Qatar; United Arab Emirates
- Products: Philippine cuisine Seafood; Grilled food
- Website: www.gerrysgrill.com

Gerry's Restaurant and Bar, formerly Gerry's Grill, is a group of restaurants in the Philippines which has branches in the other countries. Its first branch opened at Tomas Morato Avenue in Quezon City on February 14, 1997. Later, four branches opened in the US. In 2010, it started to expand in Singapore and, in 2012, in Qatar. As of Jan 2025, the restaurant chain currently has over 110 branches around the Philippines and 140 branches total around the world. The menu includes grilled seafood, pica-pica (bite-sized finger foods) and Asian and Filipino dishes.

Gerry's Grill is most known for their sizzling bangus (milk fish), sisig, and their blue marlin as featured in their company logo.

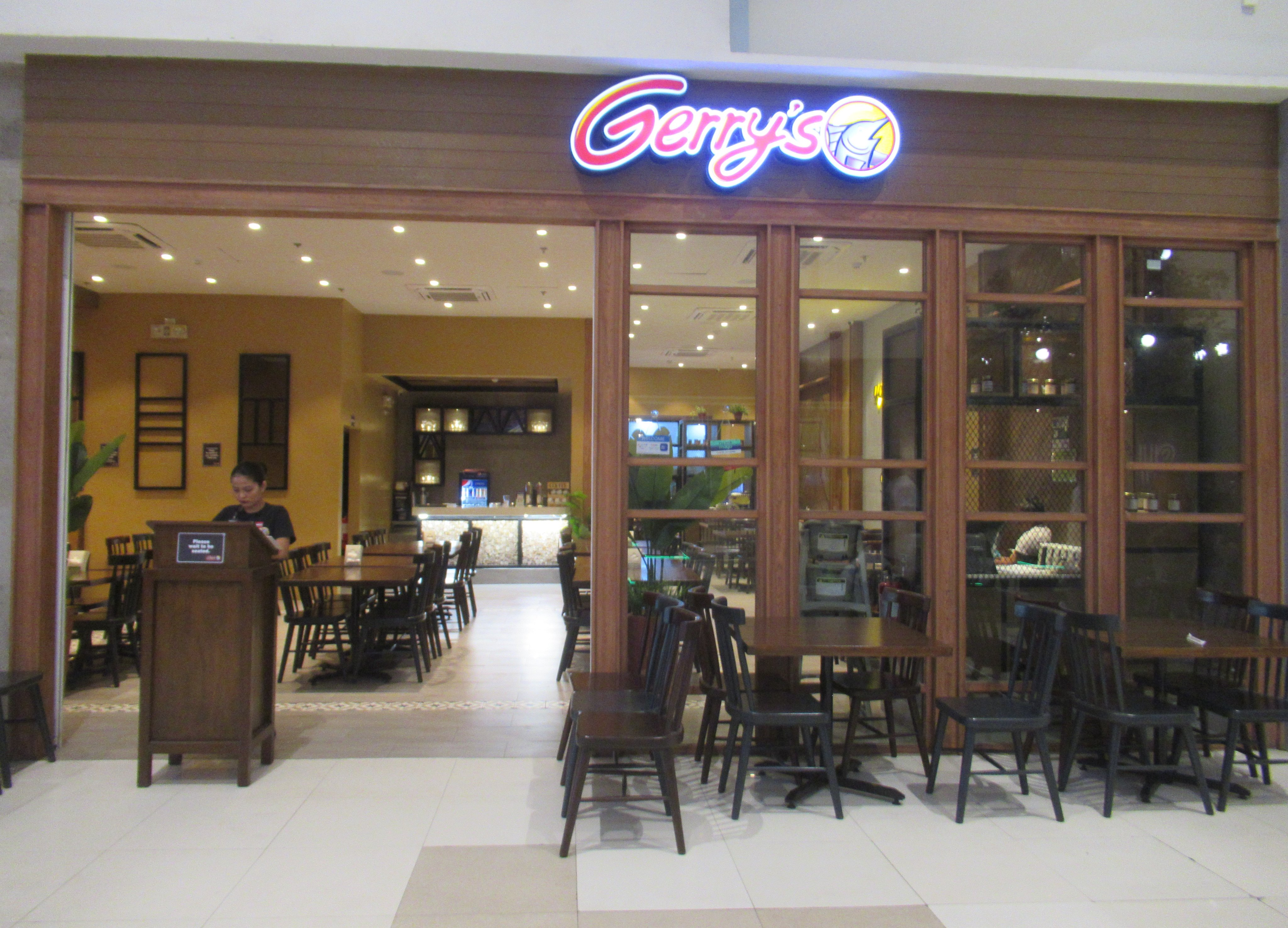
Facade in 2024

== History ==
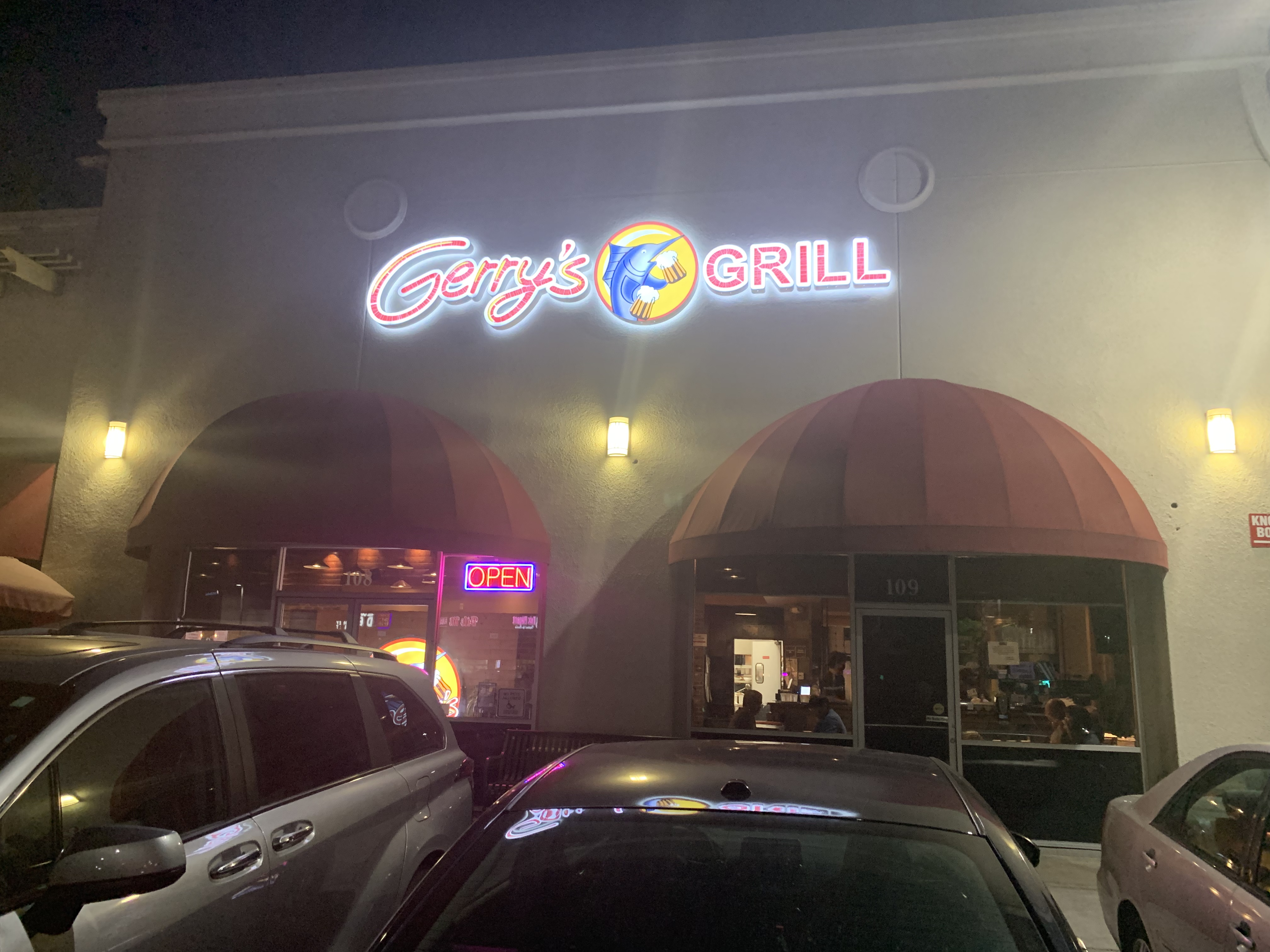
A Gerry’s Grill in Los Angeles, California.

Gerry's Grill was opened by Gerry Apolinario on February 14, 1997, as a bar where people could hang out after work.

Originally conceived as a venue where patrons could unwind with a drink or two, Gerry’s has also evolved into a family restaurant.

Since opening its first location in Tomas Morato, Quezon City, with continuous nationwide expansion, the restaurant chain has established branches in the United States, Singapore, and Qatar.

After opening four branches in the United States, the restaurant chain planned to open an outlet in Singapore. It opened at the Marina Bay in December 2010.
