= Kultura (restaurant) =

Filipino restaurant in Charleston, South Carolina, U.S.

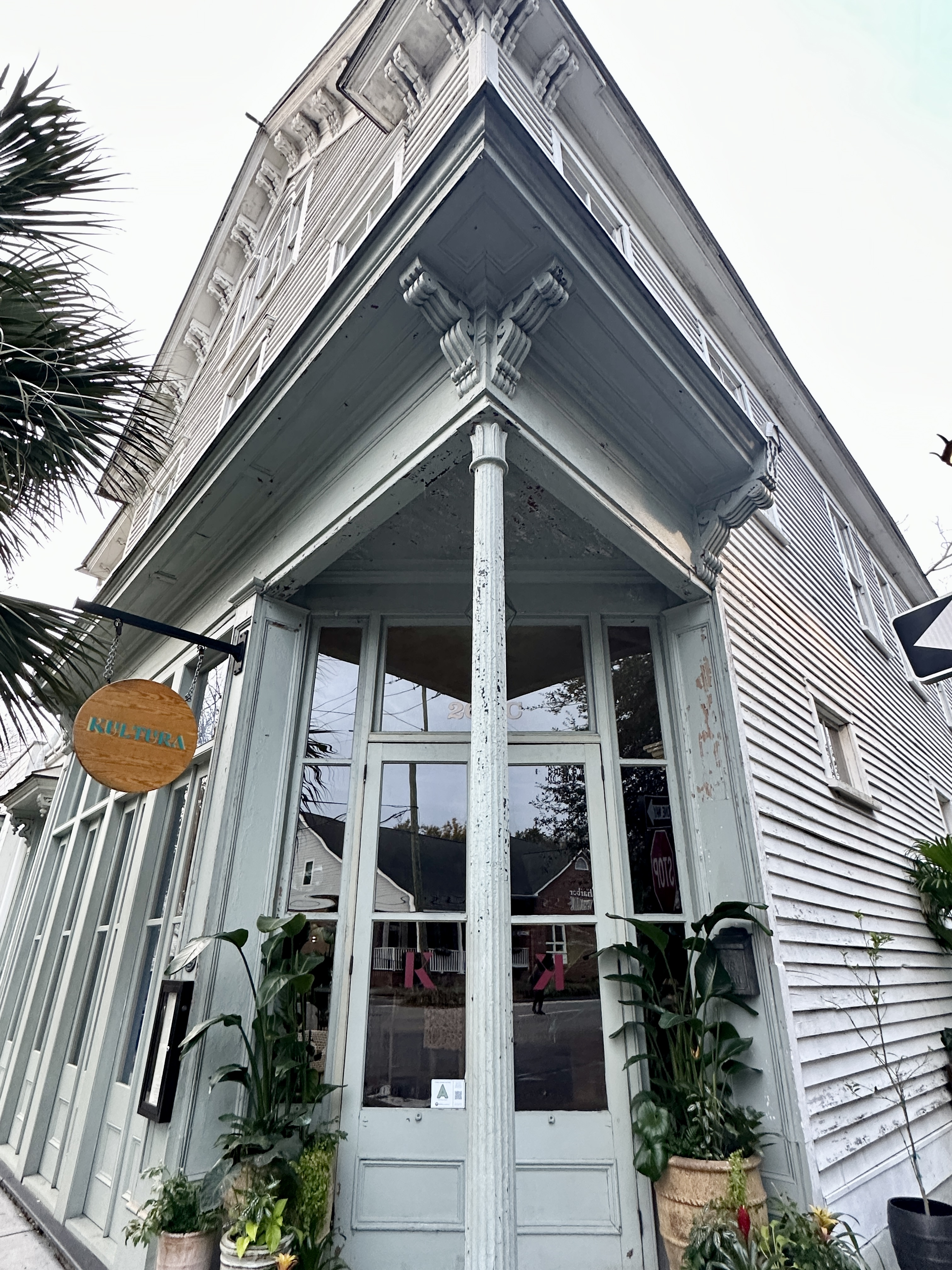
- The restaurant's exterior in 2026
- Interactive map of Kultura

Restaurant information
- Head chef: Nikko Cagalanan
- Food type: Filipino
- Location: 267 Rutledge Avenue, Charleston, South Carolina, 29403, United States
- Coordinates: 32°47′29″N 79°56′40″W

Kultura is a Filipino restaurant in Charleston, South Carolina, United States. It was named one of twelve best new restaurants in the United States by Eater in 2023. The restaurant opened in July 2023 by executive chef Nikko Cagalanan. Cagalanan was nominated for a 2024 James Beard Award in the Emerging Chef category.

== See also ==
- List of Filipino restaurants
