= Classic Savory =

Filipino restaurant chain

- Industry: Restaurants
- Founded: 1940s in Rizal Avenue, Manila (as Tops Café); 1951 in Escolta Street (as Savory Luncheonette); 2007 in SM Mall of Asia (as Classic Savory)
- Founder: Antonio Ting; Ramon Tan (relaunch)
- Number of locations: 115
- Area served: Philippines
- Products: Philippine cuisine
- Website: classicsavory.com

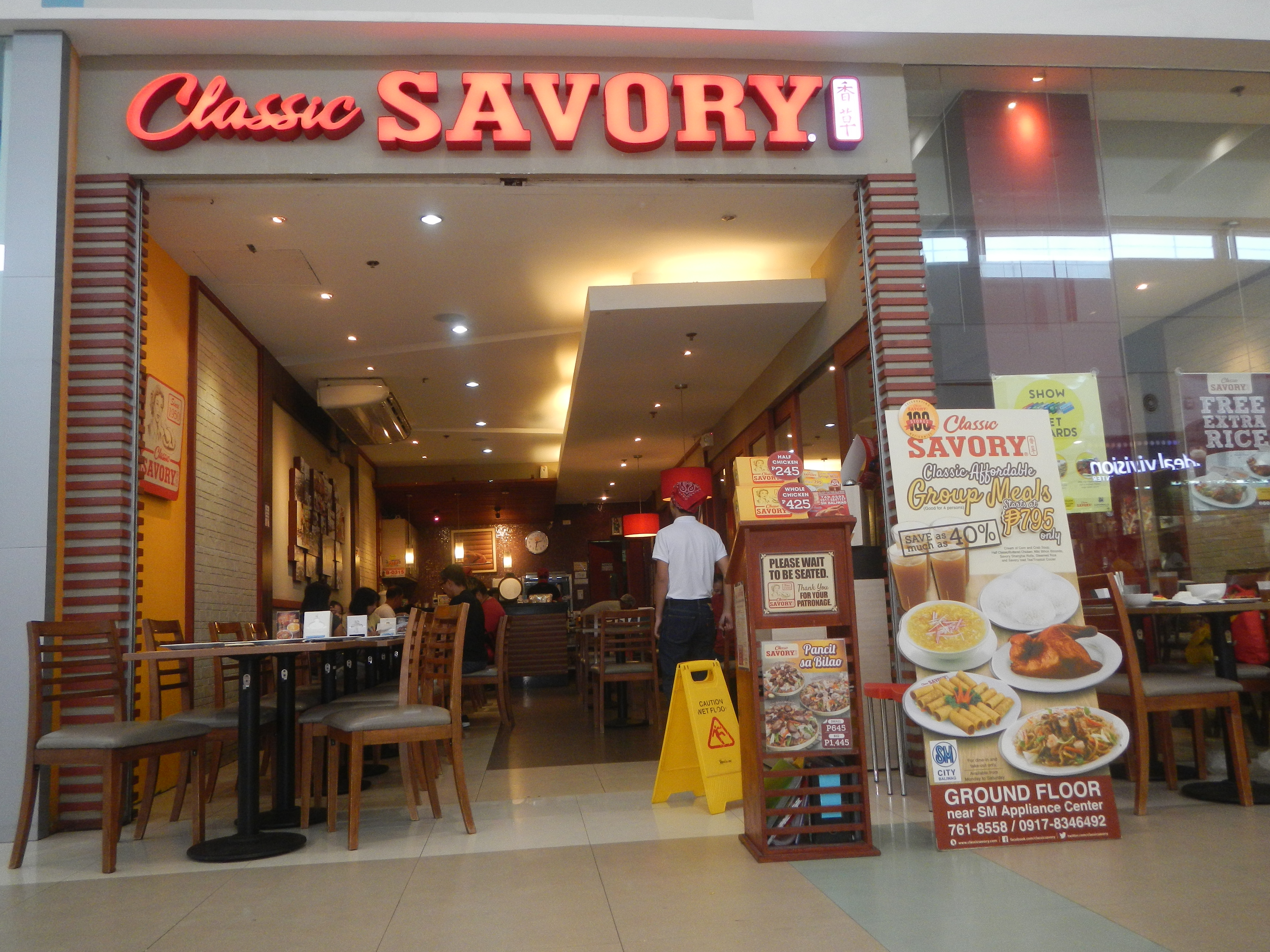
Classic Savory restaurant in Baliwag, Bulacan

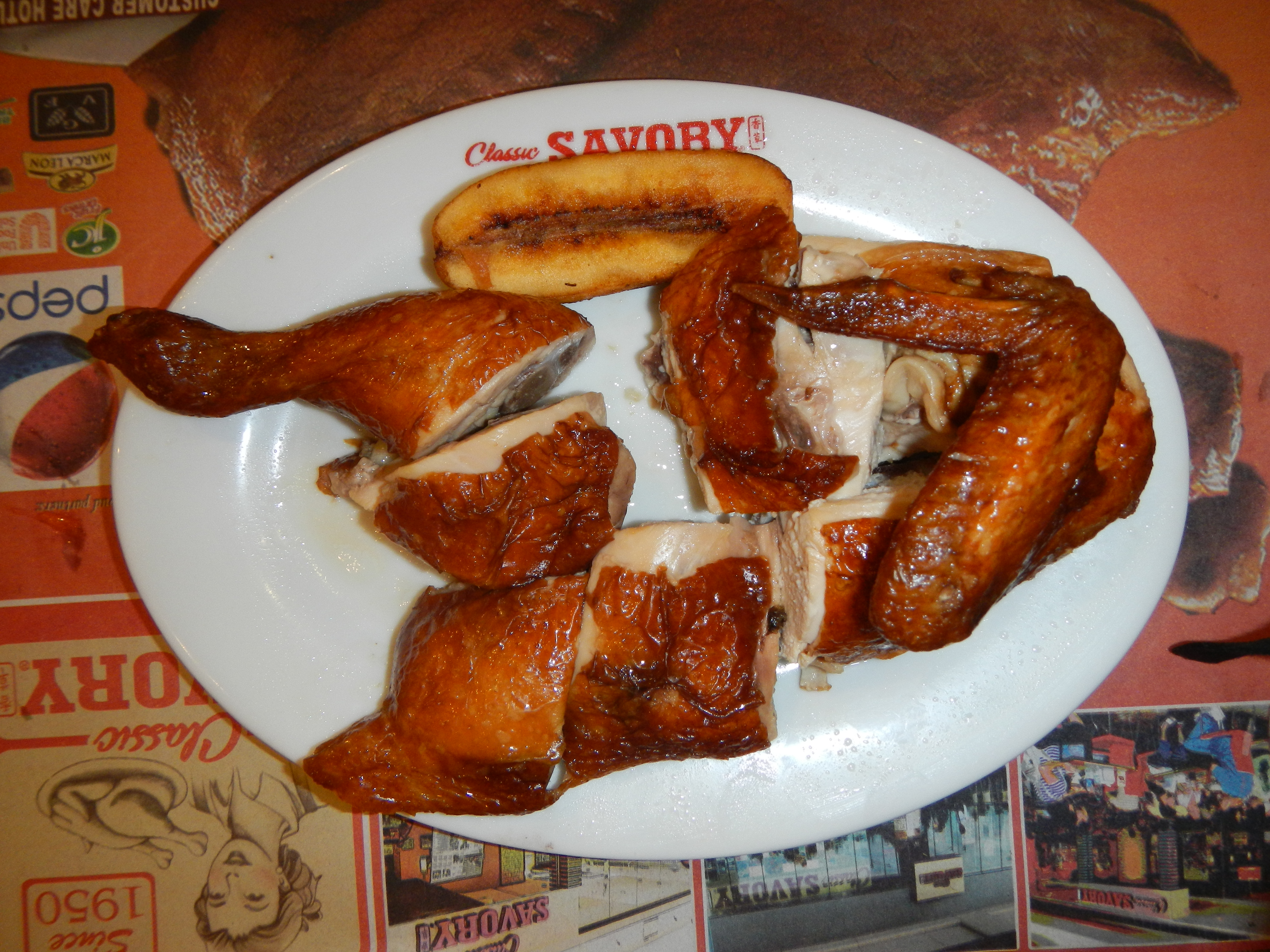
Savory Chicken

Classic Savory (Min Nan Chinese: 香草) is a Filipino restaurant chain primarily serving Filipino-Chinese cuisine.

Classic Savory is most known for its chicken.

== History ==
Classic Savory can be traced in the early 1940s when Tony Ting, one of four brothers who emigrated to the Philippines from Amoy, China (now Xiamen), opened Tops Café at Rizal Avenue in Manila. The establishment ceased operations during the Japanese occupation of World War II.

In 1951, it moved to Escolta Street in Manila as Savory Luncheonette. The branch moved to the nearby Estrella del Norte building. In the 1970s, the Ting brothers decided to divide among themselves the existing assets. Tony Ting got the Padre Faura branch, which eventually closed. His son Eduardo started his own Savory business.

After a series of relocations and revitelizations, it relaunched in 2007 by Ramon Tan, Ting's son, as Classic Savory at the SM Mall of Asia in Pasay.

The location in Escolta Street, now named Savory Restaurant, was destroyed in a fire on April 24, 2015.
