= Archipelago (restaurant) =

Restaurant in Seattle, Washington, U.S.

- Interactive map of Archipelago

Restaurant information
- Established: December 1, 2018
- Owners: Aaron Verzosa and Amber Manuguid
- Manager: Amber Manuguid
- Head chef: Aaron Verzosa
- Location: 5607 Rainier Ave S., Seattle, King, Washington, 98118, United States
- Coordinates: 47°33′6.1″N 122°16′41.7″W
- Seating capacity: 12
- Website: archipelagoseattle.com

Archipelago is a Filipino-American restaurant in Seattle, Washington.

== Description ==
The restaurant is owned by husband and wife Aaron Verzosa and Amber Manuguid. The seasonal menu is sourced entirely from the region. It has included lechon, kinilaw with local ginger, as well as halo-halo with pine apple ice.

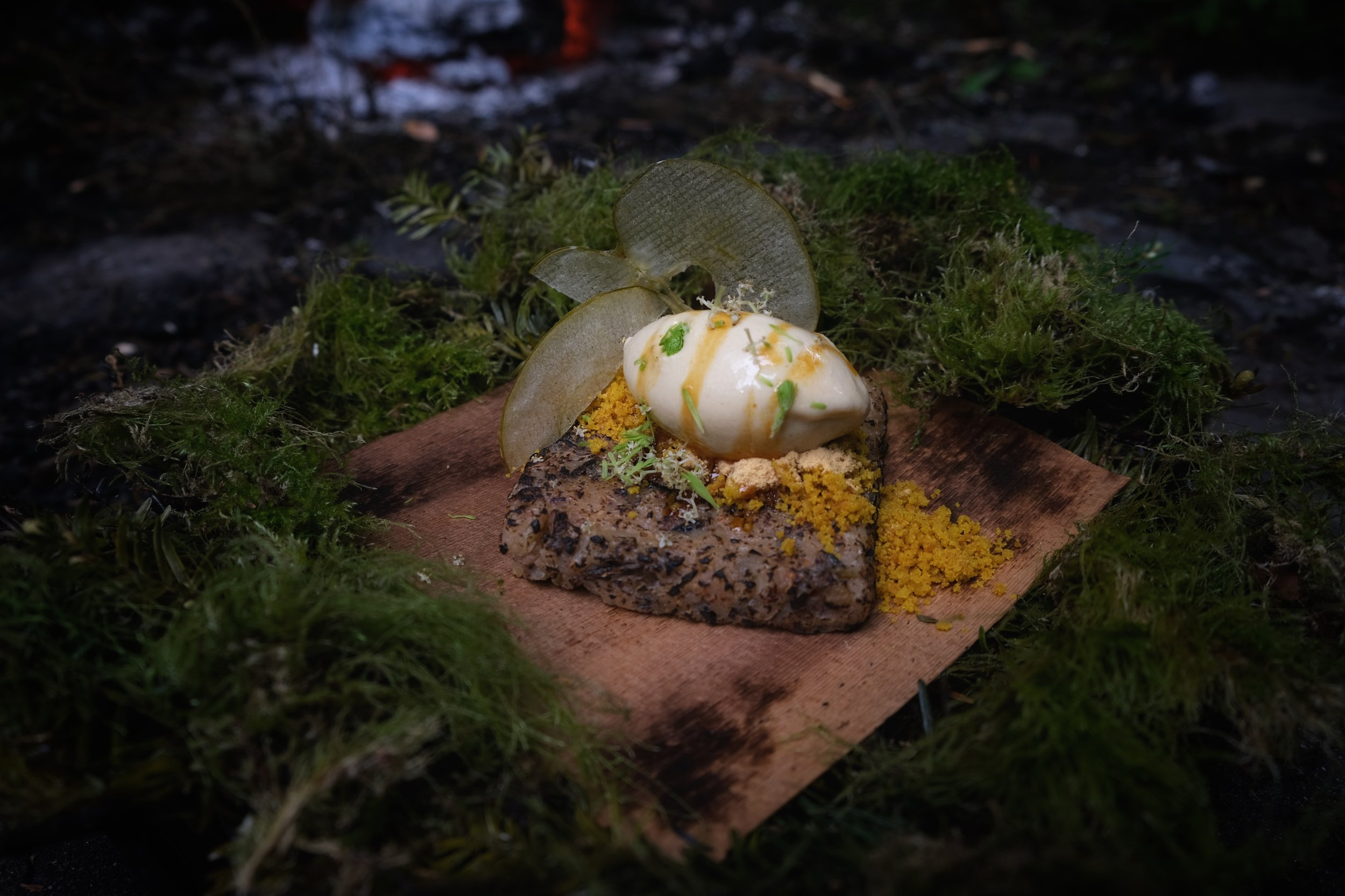
Madrona smoked hazelnut suman / lola smith apple caramel / elderflower leche flan custard / young pine

== Reception ==
In 2019, it was named Eater Seattle's Restaurant of the Year. Gabe Guarente wrote, "This tiny Filipino tasting menu restaurant in Hillman City stood out for its ingenuity, storytelling, and passion." Olivia Hall included the business in TimeOut Seattle's 2021 overview of the city's 21 best restaurants.

In 2021, it made the New York Times America’s Favorite Restaurant List.

In The Infatuation's 2022 list of "The 25 Best Restaurants in Seattle", Aimee Rizzo called Archipelago’s 10-course dinner "a billboard for the Pacific Northwest and a meal that should be required by law for every resident". She said guests leave with "a newfound appreciation for both Filipino food and the surrounding PNW".

In 2023, the restaurant earned Aaron Verzosa a James Beard Foundation Award nomination in the Best Chef: Northwest and Pacific category.

== See also ==
- List of Filipino restaurants
