= Filipino-American cuisine =

Fusion cuisine

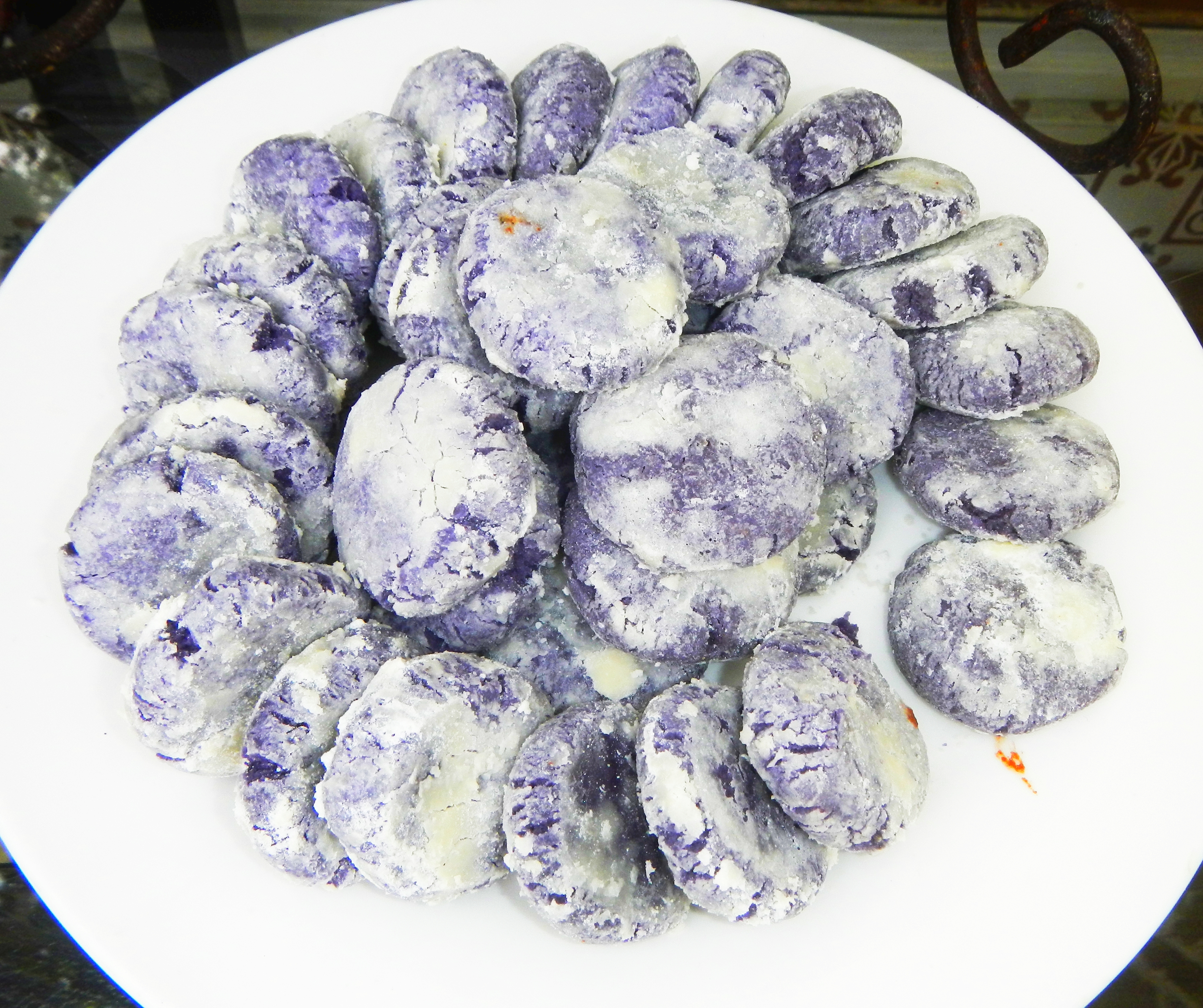
Ube crinkle cookies are an adaptation of Filipino flavors into western cuisines, like the United States.

Filipino-American cuisine has been present in the United States since ever Filipinos first immigrated there, but only recently has Filipino food become more widely popular. Filipino food has evolved by adapting other cultures' food practices into their own, or borrowing other food concepts into their own.

Filipinos debuted their food as they immigrated to the United States by presenting it in catering and opening the Philippines' most popular food chain, Jollibee. There is also a long list of different Filipino dishes that represent Filipino Americans.

== American influence ==
American influence on Filipino food has turned authentic meals into frozen, ready-cooked meals. This technique was used on Filipino dishes when the Marigold Commodities Corporation teamed up with Ditta Meat Food Service Company to create these frozen Filipino meals. They started in Austin, Texas, and released a few dishes that would incorporate the meat of America with Philippine flavors to create Filipino-American food.

=== Types of food ===
There were four of these Americanized Filipino dishes released in Texas under the work of Marigold Commodities and Ditta Meat Food Service. Beef tapa uses Texas meat marinated with garlic, citrus flavors, and soy sauce, then grilled or fried. The other dishes are tocino using chicken and pork, and pork longaniza.

== Restaurants ==
=== Catering ===
The Filipino restaurant trend of catering is continued in many restaurants such as Sunda in Chicago and Purple Yam in Brooklyn. They have also continued to sell typical Filipino dishes in bulk such as lechon.

== Types of Filipino American dishes ==
A typical Filipino American dish consists of a soup, ulam (any food), kanin (rice), meat, fruits, and dipping sauces.

Some such soups may include Munggo gisado sabaw, which consists of Mung beans and pork or shrimp. Another soup dish is pancit molo, a Filipino style wonton soup. Meat dishes include adobo made with pork or chicken; the dish is then cooked with vinegar, soy sauce, and garlic.

Suman banana leaves containing sticky rice can be dipped in sugar to make it taste sweeter. Taho is a dessert that uses a syrup and boba inside of a jello-like soybean material.

== Staples in Filipino food ==
Filipino-Americans eat up to five or six times a day across meals and snacks. Almusál is a large breakfast containing rice and meat. Tanghalian or lunch is preceded by a merienda or small snack. Another merienda is eaten before dinner or hapunan. Then, after dinner, there is another merienda and dessert or panghimagas.

Filipino-Americans commonly eat steamed white rice, fruit, fish, vegetables, eggs, and meat.

=== Rice ===
Steamed white rice is often present at all meals (breakfast, lunch, and dinner) and is considered an important part of the Filipino-American diet. It is made in large quantities, so there is enough to eat throughout the whole day. It is used as a side dish to both sweet and savory foods.

Rice is used to help intensify some flavors, or create other Filipino dishes like puto and bibingka. Puto can be meat-filled, ube-filled, or turned into cakes; it is made by making rice into flour. Puto and bibingka are two specialized versions of the Filipino delicacy, kakanin. Kakanin recipes vary depending on the region of the Philippines, so there are many specialized recipes of Kakanin from different locations.

Rice is also created into a dessert called suman, a sweet rice wrapped in a leaf from a coconut or banana.

=== Coconut ===
Coconut, like rice, is another staple in Filipino dishes (it is known as buko in Filipino) and can be used in drinks, main dishes, or desserts. There are dishes native to a specific region, such as how Quezon has a dish using a leaf-wrapped shrimp and buko strips cooked in buko water. Another region makes buko mixed with chicken and ginger; they also make a dish where the noodles are made of coconut. The white insides of the coconut are used to make milk, ginataan, and halo-halo, among other foods.

== Filipino-American food at celebrations ==
Celebrations and festivals are a key part of the Filipino-American lifestyle and culture. There are particular dishes at these celebrations that hold important significance for Filipino-Americans. Adobo, pansit, and léchon are examples of such dishes. Adobo includes braised meat, vinegar, and garlic, but there are several variations depending on the ingredients available. Pansit consists of noodles with seafood, meat (pork or beef), poultry (chicken), or vegetables, herbs, and spices. Lechón is a whole, roasted pig. Lechón leftovers are used as ingredients in other Filipino dishes, including adobo. Some of these dishes also hold symbolic significance, like pansit, which means long life.

Dessert is also an important part of celebrations, with dishes like kakanin or leche flan present at these gatherings. Kakanin is a rice cake eaten daily as a snack, but it is also served at celebrations and gatherings. Leche flan is a caramel custard made using eggs and milk.

== Filipino-American health ==
=== Food and health ===
A 2012 study across Asian American subgroups in Southern California (Chinese, Filipino, Korean, Japanese, and Vietnamese Americans) found that Filipino Americans self-reported the highest body mass indexes (BMIs). This is because, after the migration of the Filipinos to the United States, their diets changed by increasing in energy-dense food, processed food, and decreasing in fruits and vegetables.This seems to have has a negative effect on the body, leading to increase body weight and other health-related problems.

=== United States and Canada ===
One study in Canada on the average Filipino woman's health focused mainly on the idea of body size, eating, and health. Western culture has associated "health" of women with being thin is attractive and vice versa for being fatter. The study found and that there was a risk of being "fat" associated with eating rice and an association of being thinner when watching fat and rice intake.

== See also ==
- Filipino cuisine
- Filipino Americans
