= Malaysian Chinese cuisine =

Culinary traditions of Chinese Malaysian immigrants and their descendants

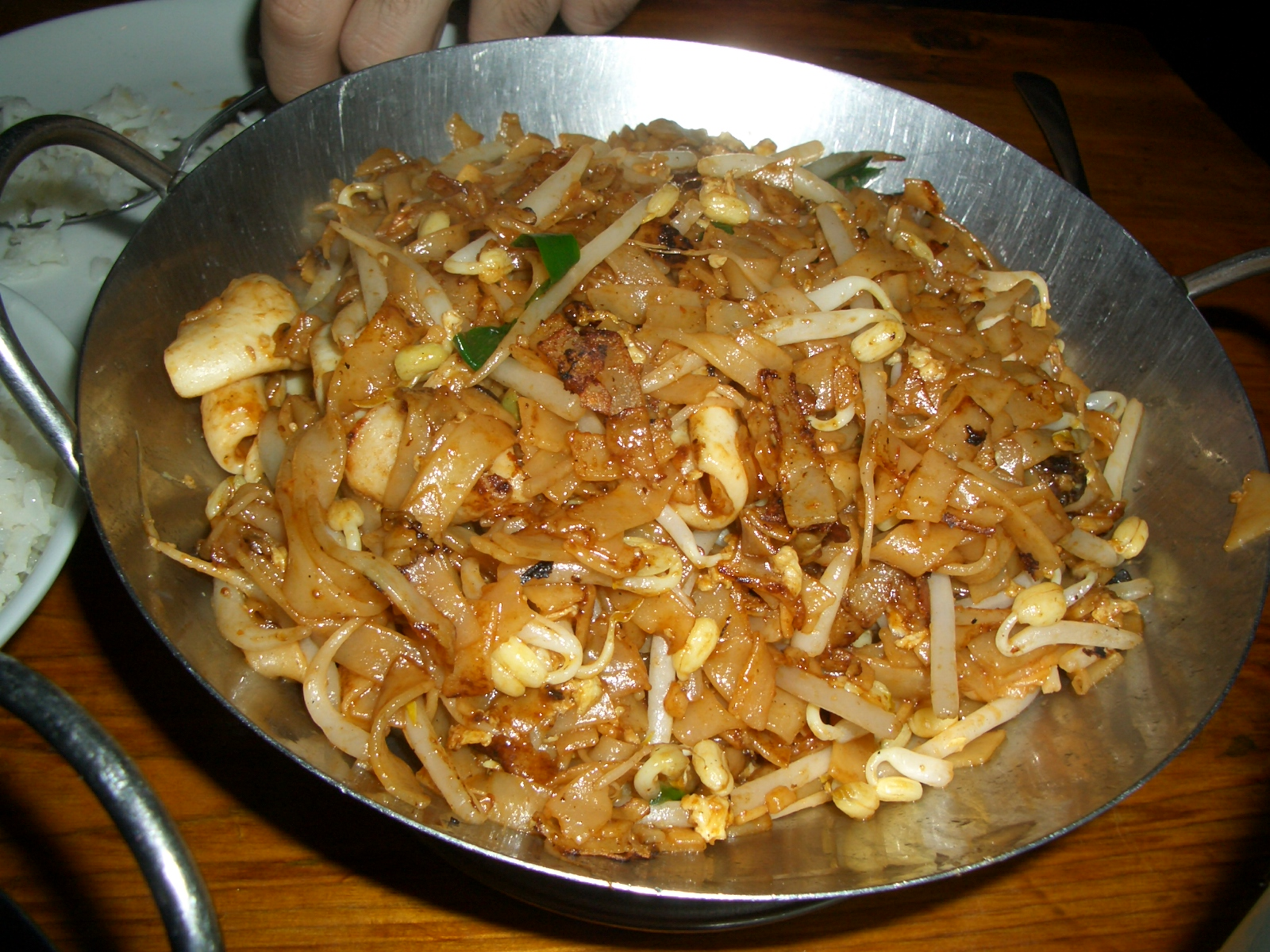
Penang-style char kway teow

Malaysian Chinese cuisine is derived from the culinary traditions of Chinese Malaysian immigrants and their descendants, who have adapted or modified their culinary traditions under the influence of Malaysian culture as well as immigration patterns of Chinese to Malaysia. Malaysian Chinese cuisine is predominantly based on an eclectic repertoire of dishes with roots from Fujian, Cantonese, Hakka and Teochew cuisines.

As these early immigrants settled in different regions throughout what was then British Malaya and Borneo, they carried with them traditions of foods and recipes that were particularly identified, which gradually became infused with the characteristics of their new home locale in Malaysia while remaining distinctively Chinese. For example, Hainanese chicken rice is usually flavoured with tropical pandan leaves and served with chilli sauce for dipping, and tastes unlike the typical chicken dishes found in Hainan Island itself. Some of these foods and recipes became closely associated with a specific city, town or village, eventually developing iconic status and culminating in a proliferation of nationwide popularity in the present day.

Chinese food is especially prominent in areas with concentrated Chinese communities, at roadside stalls, hawker centres and kopi tiam, as well as smart cafes and upmarket restaurants throughout the nation. Many Chinese dishes have pork as a component ingredient, but chicken is available as a substitution for Muslim customers from the wider community, and some Chinese restaurants are even halal-certified.

== List of dishes found in Malaysian Chinese cuisine ==
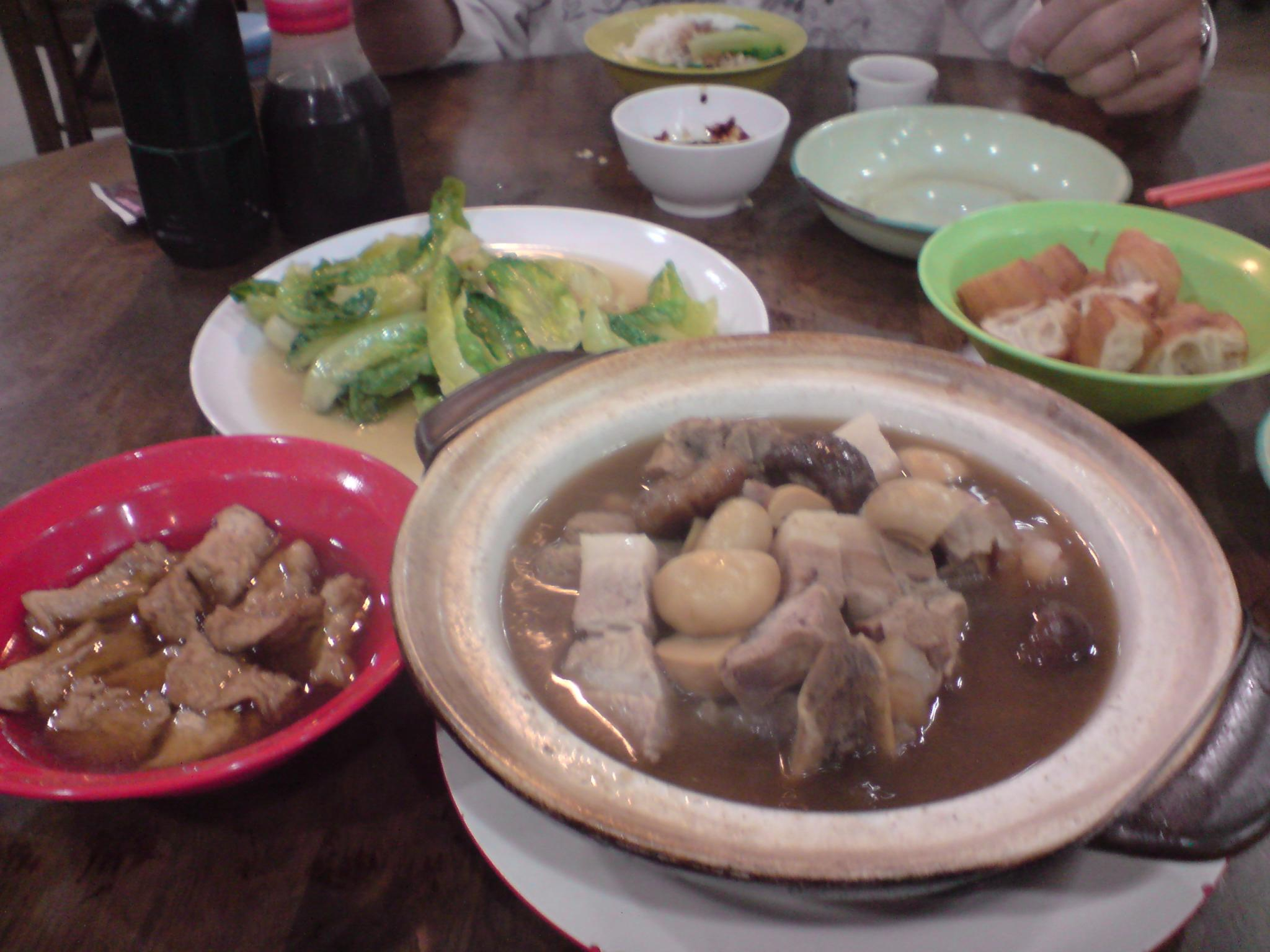
Bak Kut Teh

- Bak kut teh (Chinese: 肉骨茶) (pork ribs soup). "Bak kut teh" in Hokkien means "meat bone tea", and the dish is pork ribs cooked with garlic, dark soy sauce and a specific combination of herbs and spices which have been boiled for several hours. Popularly regarded as a health tonic, this soup is believed to have originated in Klang, Selangor, and eaten accompanied with strong tea ("teh") and a plate of cut you char kway (Chinese fried breadsticks) for dipping. There are some differences in seasoning amongst other Chinese communities; the Teochew prefer a clear broth with more pepper and garlic (more common in Johor and Singapore), while the Cantonese may include additional varieties of medicinal herbs and spices. Variations include the so-called chik kut teh (made with chicken) and other non-pork versions with beef or mutton that are gaining popularity with Muslim diners, seafood bak kut teh, and a "dry" (reduced gravy) version which originated from the town of Klang.
- Bakkwa (Chinese: 肉干) - literally "dried meat", bakkwa is better understood as barbequed meat jerky. While this dish is especially popular during the Chinese New Year celebration period, it is available everywhere and eaten year-round as a popular snack.
- Bean sprouts chicken (Chinese: 芽菜雞) - Ipoh's best-known dish, bean sprouts chicken consists of poached or steamed chicken accompanied with a plate of blanched locally grown bean sprouts in a simple dressing of soy sauce and sesame oil. The crunchy and stout texture of Ipoh-grown bean sprouts is attributed to the mineral-rich properties of local water supplies. The dish is usually served with hor fun noodles in a chicken broth, or plain rice.
- Beaufort mee (Chinese: 保佛炒麵) is a speciality of Beaufort town. Handmade noodles are smoked, then wok-tossed with meat (usually slices of char siu and marinated pork) or seafood and plenty of choy sum, and finished off with a thick viscous gravy.
- Cantonese fried noodles (Chinese: 廣府炒麵) refers to a preparation of noodles which are shallow- or deep-fried to a crisp, then served as the base for a thick egg and cornstarch white sauce cooked with sliced lean pork, seafood, and green vegetables like choy sum. A related dish called wa tan hor (Chinese: 滑旦河) uses hor fun noodles, but the noodles are not deep-fried, merely charred. Another variation called yuen yong (Chinese: 鴛鴦) involves mixing both crisp-fried rice vermicelli as well as hor fun to form a base for the sauce.
- Chai tow kway (Chinese: 菜頭粿) - a common dish in Malaysia made of rice flour. It also known as fried radish cake, although no radish is included within the rice cakes, save perhaps the occasional addition of preserved radish (Chinese: 菜圃) during the cooking process. Seasonings and additives vary from region, and may include bean sprouts and eggs.

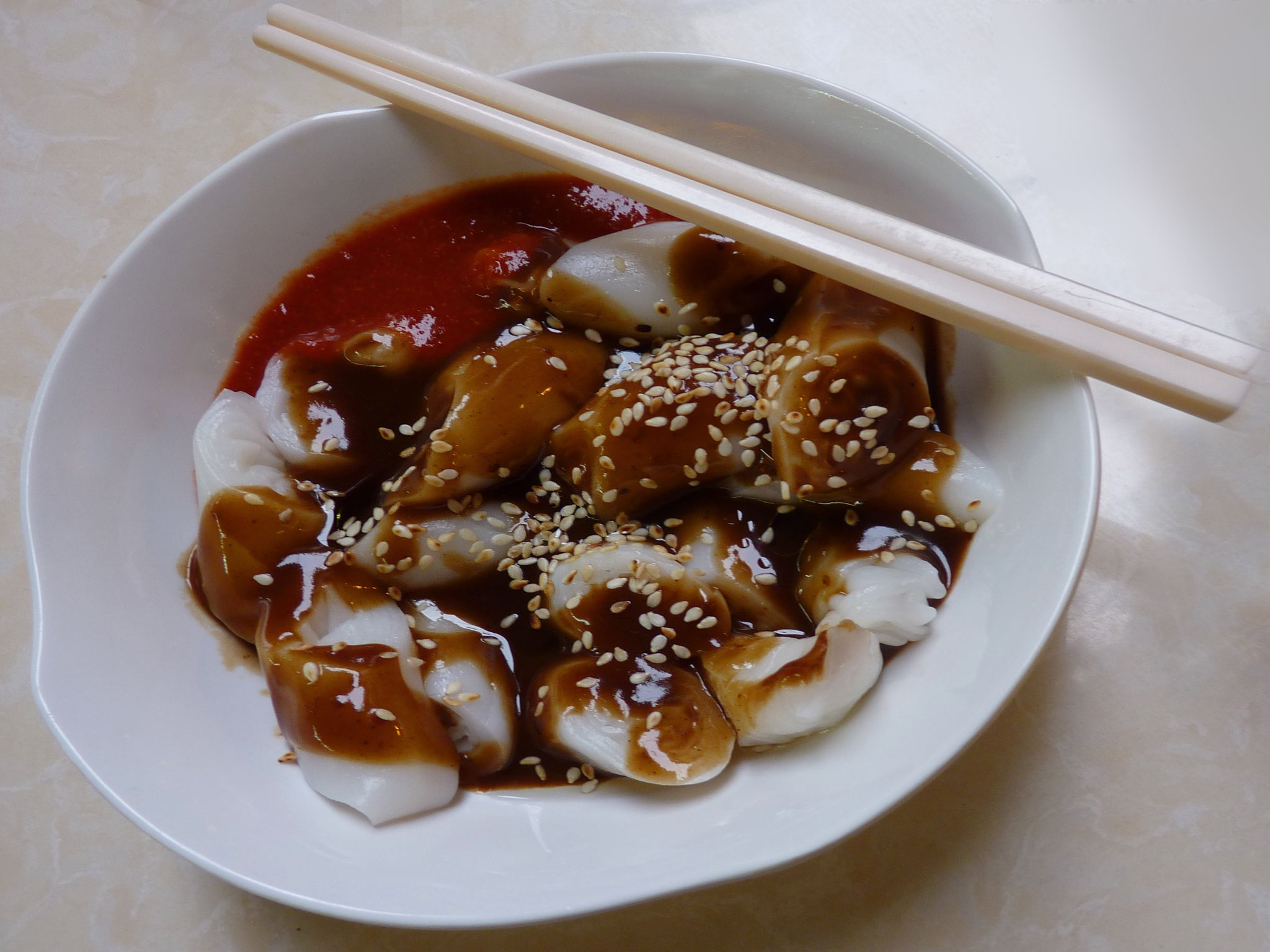
Penang-style chee cheong fun

- Chee cheong fun (Chinese: 豬腸粉) is square rice sheets made from a viscous mixture of rice flour and water. This liquid is poured onto a specially made flat pan in which it is steamed to produce the square rice sheets. The steamed rice sheets is rolled or folded for ease in serving. It is usually served with tofu stuffed with fish paste. The dish is eaten with accompaniment of semi sweet fermented bean paste sauce, chilli paste or light vegetable curry gravy. Ipoh and Penang have different versions of the dish as well; certain stalls in Ipoh serve the dish with a red sweet sauce, thinly sliced pickled green chillies and fried shallots, while in Penang, a type of sweet, black shrimp sauce called hae ko is the main condiment.
- Chun gen (Chinese : 春卷) is an oblong roll of seasoned ground pork or beef wrapped with a thin omelette and steamed. The name is derived from the Hakka word for the spring season, which is pronounced as "chun". (Another explanation is that "chun" is for "egg" instead.) It is said to have been around since Chunqiu period with a rumor of Duke Huan of Qi and since then it has been a custom in Fujian. Today it is available beyond Tenom, and found throughout Sabah's Chinese communities. It may be eaten on its own, cooked in broth or soup, and stir-fried with noodles or vegetables.

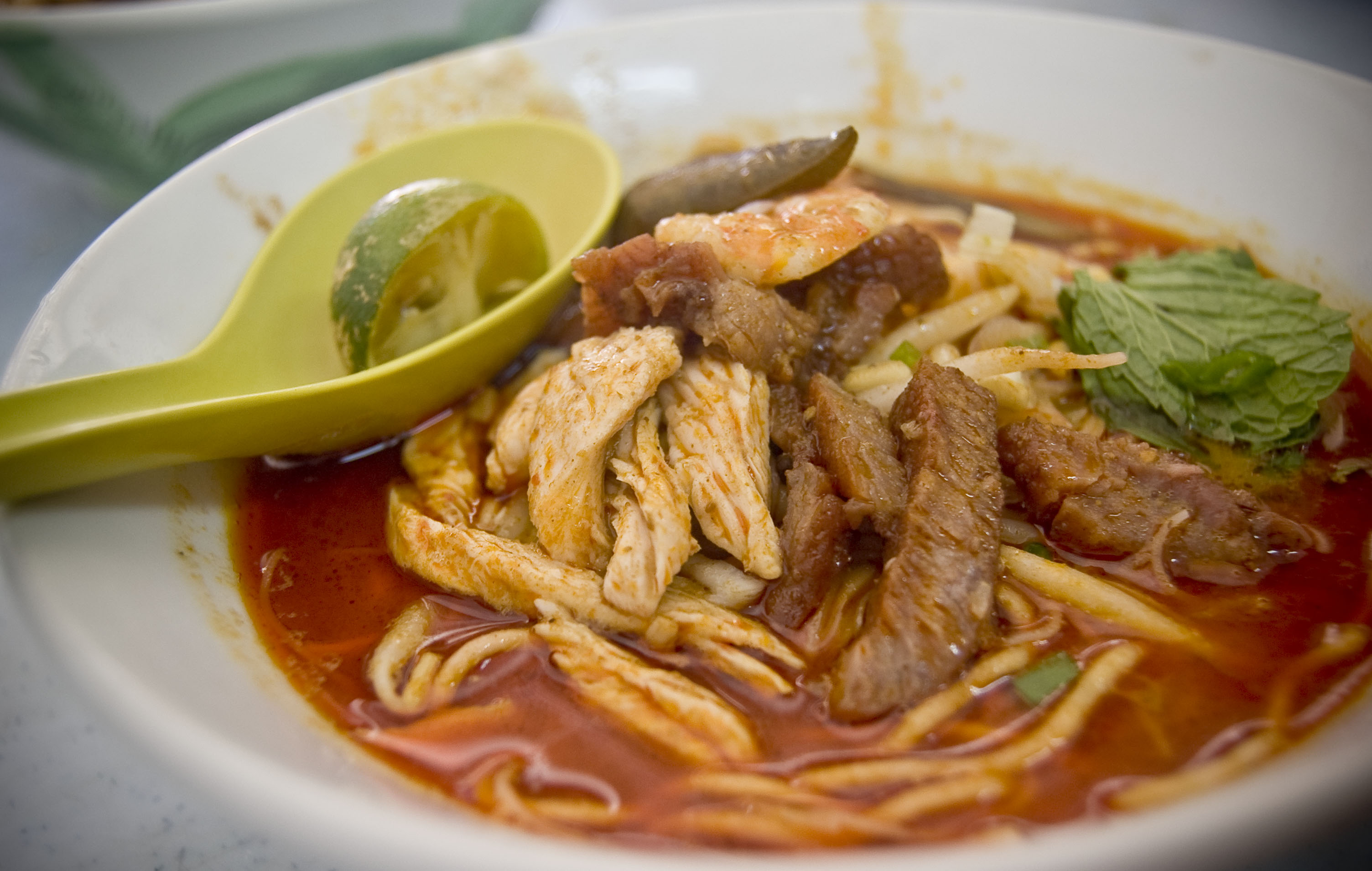
Curry mee

- Curry mee (Chinese : 咖喱麵). A bowl of thin yellow noodles mixed with bihun in a spicy curry soup enriched with coconut milk, and topped with tofu puffs, prawns, cuttlefish, chicken, long beans, cockles and mint leaves, with sambal served on the side. It is often referred to as curry laksa.
- Fish balls (Chinese: 魚丸、鱼蛋、魚圓) are fish paste shaped into a spherical shape. Usually fish ball is served as a condiment together with rice vermicelli or yellow noodles in a clear soup base. Bean sprouts and spring onions are also commonly added, complemented by a small plate of chilli padi soaked in soy sauce. Fishcake is also a common addition.
- Fuzhou cuisine can be found in the Sitiawan, Perak area, as well as several cities and towns in Sarawak where the Hookchiu diaspora have formed settlements. Well-known specialities include ang zhao mee sua (Chinese : 红槽面线), and kompyang or kompia (Chinese : 光餅).
- Hakka mee (Chinese : 客家麵) - Hakka mee is a simple dish of noodles topped with a ground meat gravy. A popular hawker dish with Hakka cultural roots, it is based on an older recipe called dabumian (Chinese : 大埔麵); the name indicates its place of origin as Dabu County (Chinese: 大埔县), the center of Hakka culture in mainland China.
- Heong peng (Chinese : 香餅) - these fragrant pastries, which resemble slightly flattened balls, are a famed speciality of Ipoh. It contains a sweet sticky filling made from malt and shallots, covered by a flaky baked crust and garnished with sesame seeds on the surface.

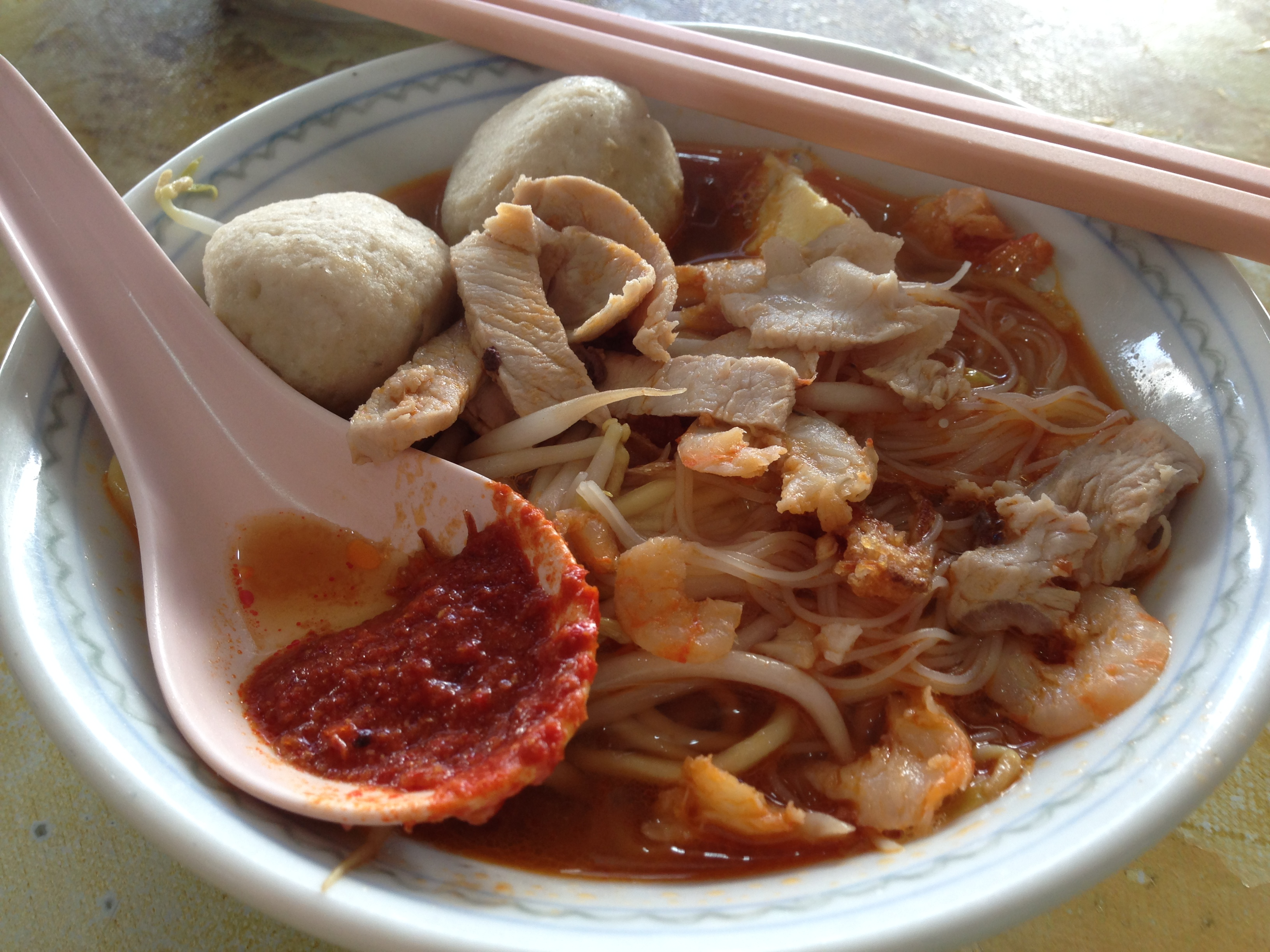
A bowl of Penang Hokkien mee

- Hokkien mee (Chinese: 福建炒麵) actually has two variants, with each being ubiquitous to a particular region of Peninsular Malaysia.
  - Penang Hokkien mee, colloquially referred to in Penang as Hokkien mee, is also known as hae mee (Chinese : 蝦麵) in other parts of Malaysia. One of Penang's most famous specialties, it is a noodle soup with yellow and rice noodles immersed in a spicy stock made from prawns and pork (chicken for halal versions), and garnished with a boiled egg, poached prawns, chopped kangkung and a dollop of sambal.
  - Hokkien char mee, a dish of thick yellow noodles braised, fried with thick black soy sauce and added with crispy lardons, is more commonly served in the Klang Valley. It was originally developed in Kuala Lumpur. Thus, within central Peninsular Malaysia, the term Hokkien mee refers to this particular version.
- Ipoh white coffee (Chinese : 怡保白咖啡). A popular coffee drink which originated in Ipoh. Unlike the robust dark roast used for typical Malaysian-style black coffee ("Kopi-O"), "white" coffee is produced with only palm oil margarine and without any sugar and wheat, resulting in a significantly lighter roast. It is typically enriched with condensed milk prior to serving.
- Kam Heong (Chinese : 金香) - literally "golden fragrance" in English, Kam Heong is a method of cooking developed in Malaysia, and is a good example of the country's culinary style of mixing cultures. The tempering of aromatics with bird's eye chilies, curry leaves, crushed dried shrimp, curry powder, oyster sauce and various other seasonings yields a versatile stir-fry sauce that goes well with chicken, clams, crabs, prawns, and squid.
- Kolo mee or mee kolok (Chinese : 乾撈麵) is a dish of springy egg noodles tossed in a sweet and savoury shallot, lard and vinegar dressing, and topped with seasoned minced pork and char siu. It is similar to Peninsular-style Hakka mee or wonton mee in concept, but differs significantly in taste profile. A popular variant uses rendered oil from cooking char siu to flavour kolo mee instead of plain lard, which gives the noodles a reddish hue. Halal versions of kolo mee replace the pork components with beef (earning the moniker of mee sapi) or chicken, and lard with peanut or vegetable oil. Additional toppings may include mushrooms, chicken and crab meat. Kampua mee (Chinese: 乾盤面) is a similar dish from Sibu and Sitiawan of Fuzhou origin.
- Kuching Laksa or Laksa Sarawak (Chinese : 古晉叻沙) is noodles (usually rice vermicelli) served in an aromatic spiced coconut milk soup, topped with shredded chicken, shredded omelette, bean sprouts, prawns, and garnished with coriander.This famous Sarawak dish looks like curry laksa however the Sarawak's version is subtler and more flavorful. It is made using a laksa paste consisting of sambal belacan, tamarind, lemongrass, herbs and spices with a little coconut milk thus giving it a fine balance of aromatic herbs and spices with a kind hint of sour and spicy note while presenting a soft but not overly rich creamy broth.
- Kway chap (Chinese : 粿汁). Teochew dish of rice noodle sheets in a dark soy sauce gravy, served with pork pieces, pig offal, tofu products and boiled eggs.
- Lor Bak(Chinese : 滷肉) - a fried meat roll made from spiced minced pork and chopped water chestnuts rolled up in soya bean curd sheets, and deep fried. It is usually served with small bowl of Lor (a thick broth thickened with corn starch and beaten eggs) and chili sauce. The term also extends to other items sold alongside the meat rolls, like tao kwa (hard tofu), pork sausages, tofu skin sheets etc.
- Lor Mee (Chinese : 滷麵). A bowl of thick yellow noodles served in a thickened gravy made from eggs, starch and pork stock.
- Marmite chicken (Chinese : 媽蜜雞) - a unique dish of marinated fried chicken pieces glazed in a syrupy sauce made from marmite, soy sauce, maltose and honey. This dish may also be prepared with other ingredients like pork ribs and prawns.

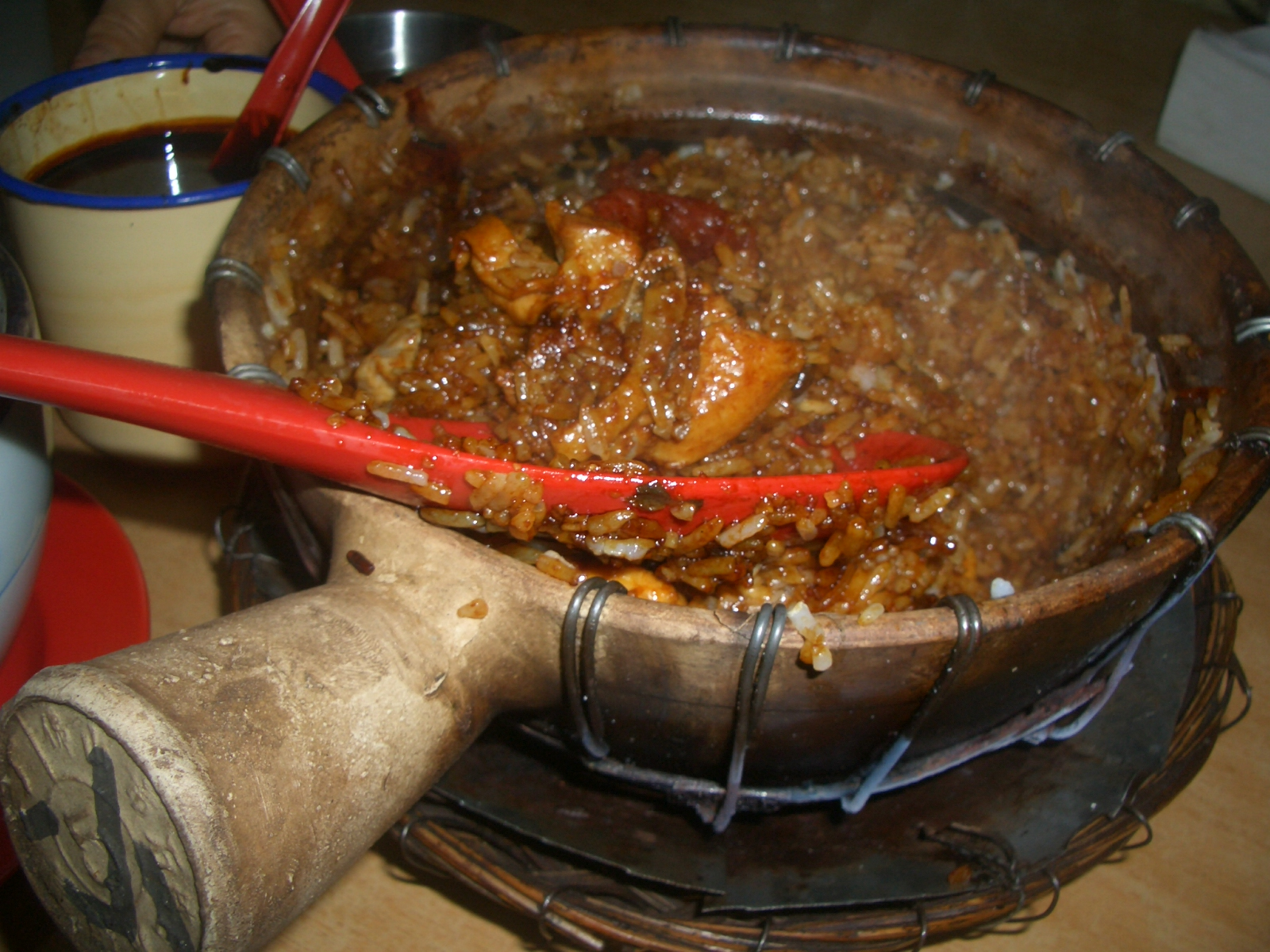
Claypot chicken rice

- Mee Hailam (Chinese : 海南麵) - stir-fried egg noodles with meat or seafood and copious amounts of vegetables, bathed in a gravy seasoned with dark soy sauce and calamansi lime. It is an ubiquitous menu item in Hainanese-run eateries and restaurants.
- Ngah Po Fan or Sha Po Fan (Chinese : 瓦煲飯 or 沙煲飯) - seasoned rice cooked in a claypot with secondary ingredients, and finished with soy sauce. A typical example is rice cooked with chicken, salted fish, Chinese sausage, and vegetables. Claypots are also used for braising noodles, meat dishes and reducing soups.

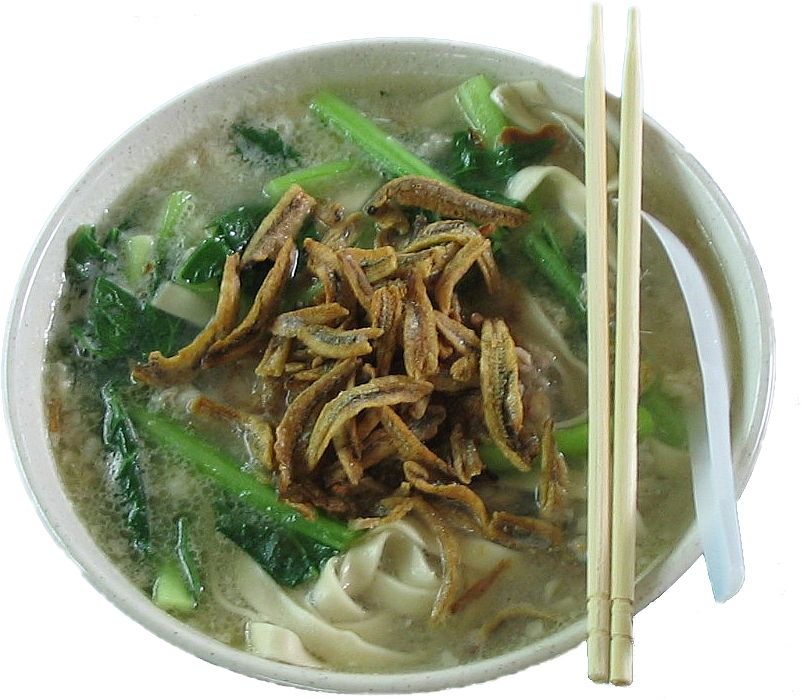
Pan Mee as served in Malaysia.

- Ngiu chap (牛什) is a Chinese-influenced dish of beef broth served with noodles, usually dunked in the soup with poached beef slices, meatballs, stewed brisket, tendon, liver and various offal parts. An iconic Sabahan dish, ngiu chap has many different variations, from the lighter Hainanese style to heartier Hakka-influenced flavours, and even village-style ngiu chap adapted for indigenous Sabahan tastes.
- Oyster omelette or O-chian (Chinese: 蚝煎) - a medley of small oysters is sauteed on a hot plate before being folded into an egg batter, which then has moistened starch mixed in for thickening, and finally fried to a crisp finish. Unlike other versions of oyster omelettes found throughout the Hokkien and Teochew diaspora, a thick savoury gravy is never poured onto Malaysian-style oyster omelettes; a chilli sauce is provided on the side for dipping instead.
- Pan mee (Chinese: 板面) - noodle soup with hand-kneaded and torn pieces of noodles or regular strips of machine-pressed noodles, with a toothsome texture not unlike Italian pasta. A variant popular in the Klang Valley is known as "Chilli Pan Mee", and which of cooked noodles served with minced pork, a poached egg, fried anchovies and fried chilli flakes which are added to taste. Chilli Pan Mee is accompanied with a bowl of clear soup with leafy vegetables.
- Popiah (Chinese: 薄餅) - Hokkien/Teochew-style crepe stuffed and rolled up with cooked shredded tofu and vegetables like turnip and carrots. The Peranakan version contains julienned bangkuang (jicama) and bamboo shoots, and the filling is seasoned with tauchu (fermented soybean paste) and meat stock. Another variation consists of popiah doused in a spicy sauce. Popiah can also be deep fried and served in a manner similar to the mainstream Chinese spring roll.
- Sang nyuk mian (Chinese: 生肉麵) is a dish of noodles served with pork broth, originating from Tawau. Very popular with the non-Muslim communities of Sabah, it is named after the poached-to-order slices of tender marinated pork served in pork broth which is flavoured with fried lard bits. The noodles (usually thick yellow noodles) are either dressed in dark soy and lard, or dunked into the soup along with the aforementioned pork slices, vegetables, meatballs and offal.
- Seremban Siew Pau (Chinese: 芙蓉燒包). The city of Seremban, the state capital of Negeri Sembilan, is famous for its siew pau, a flaky oven-baked pastry bun with a treacly barbecued pork and green pea filling. Chicken fillings are available as a halal option. It is a variation of the cha siu bao.
- Teochew porridge - Teochew porridge or muay (Chinese: 糜) is a type of rice porridge or soup. Unlike congee, Teochew porridge is thin and watery in texture, with visible rice grains sitting loosely at the bottom of the bowl. Eaten as a substitute for plain cooked rice instead of a complete meal by itself, it is served with an assortment of side dishes like vegetables, meat and salted egg. At eateries specialising in Teochew porridge, one can find a buffet spread of at least a dozen different dishes to choose from. Some variant recipes add sweet potatoes or even shark meat to the porridge during the cooking process.

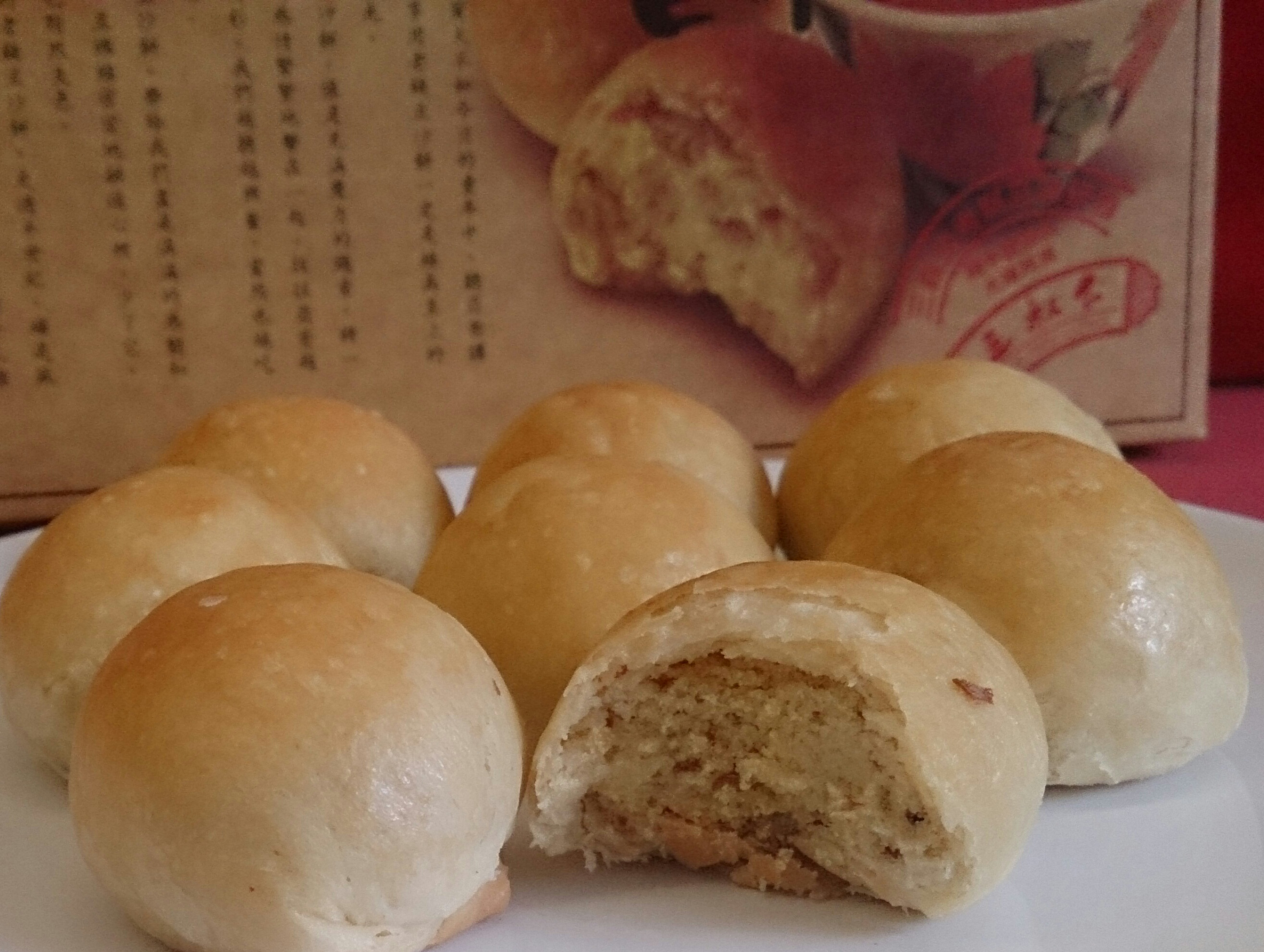
Tau sar pneah, also known as Tambun pneah, from Penang

- Tau sar pneah (Chinese: 豆沙餅) - A famous Penang delicacy, this round-shaped Chinese pastry is made of wheat flour, sugar, green bean paste, fried onions, lard and salt. It is also known as Tambun biscuits as the pastry was believed to be invented in Bukit Tambun, Penang. Its popularity as a delicacy has made this biscuit one of the must-buy souvenirs from Penang.
- Tomato kway teow (Chinese: 茄汁粿條) - kway teow noodles stir-fried with sweet tomato gravy, meat (usually chicken pieces), eggs and vegetables. A popular dish in Chinese restaurants throughout Sarawak, another variant (Chinese: 茄汁麵) utilises egg noodles which have been fried to a crisp, and then immersed with the gravy and ingredients.
- Tuaran mee (Chinese: 斗亞蘭面) is a speciality of Tuaran town. This dish of wok fried fresh handmade noodles is well known in the nearby city of Kota Kinabalu as well as in neighbouring Tamparuli town, where the localised adaptation is called Tamparuli mee (Chinese: 担波羅利炒生面). The noodles must first be toasted with oil in the wok to prevent it from clumping together, then blanched to reduce the stiff crunchy texture from toasting. The final step involves stir frying the noodles to a dry finish with eggs, vegetables, and meat or seafood.

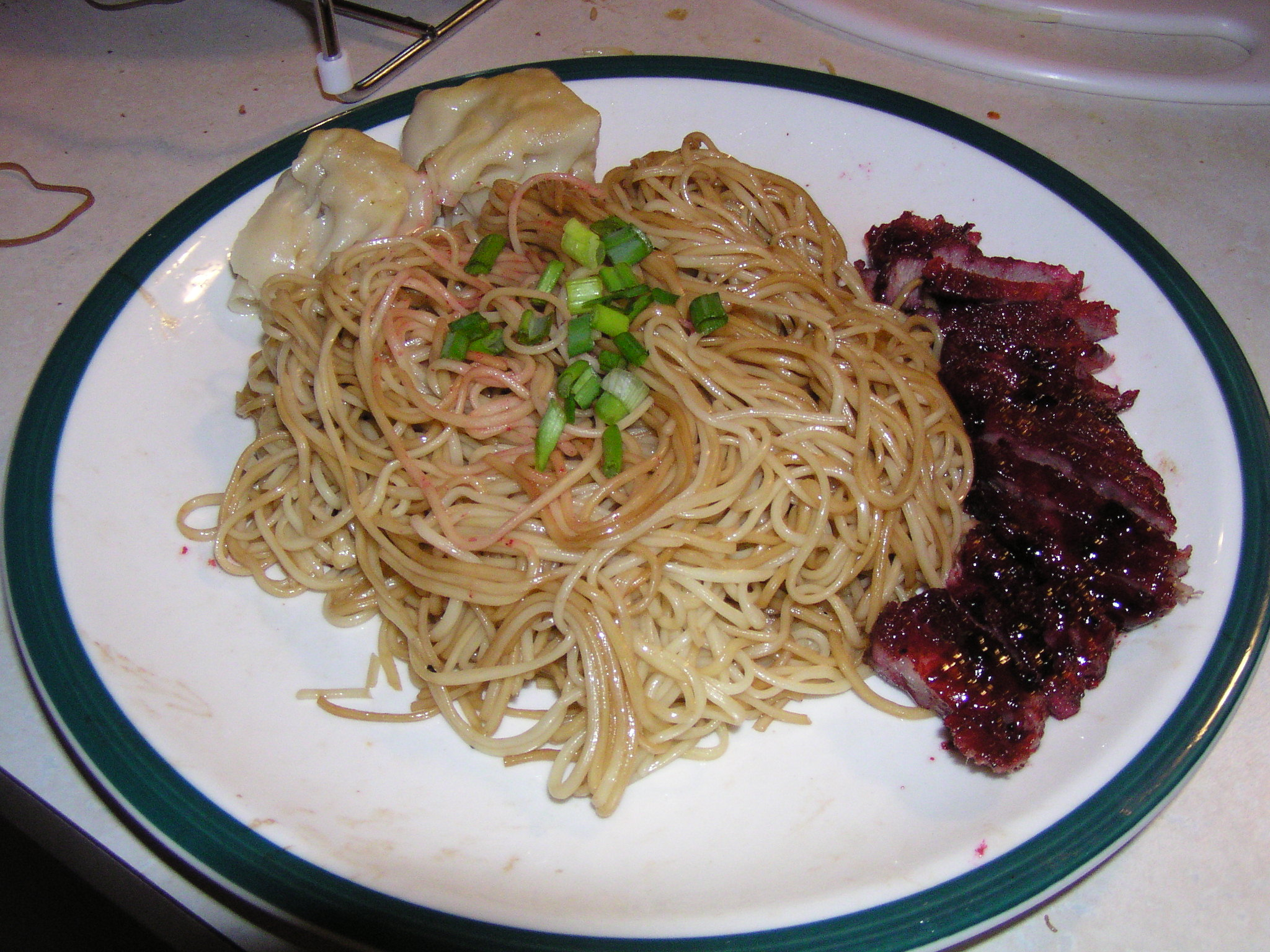
Wonton Mee

- Wonton Mee (Chinese: 雲吞麵) - thin egg noodles with wonton dumplings (Chinese: 雲吞), choy sum and char siu. The dumplings are usually made of pork or prawns and typically boiled or deep fried. The noodles may be served in a bowl of broth with dumplings as in the traditional Cantonese manner, but in Malaysia it is more commonly dressed with a dark soy sauce dressing, with boiled or deep-fried wonton dumplings as a topping or served on the side in a bowl of broth. Variations of this dish are usually in the meat accompaniments with the noodles. These may include roast pork (烧肉), braised chicken feet, and roast duck (燒鴨).

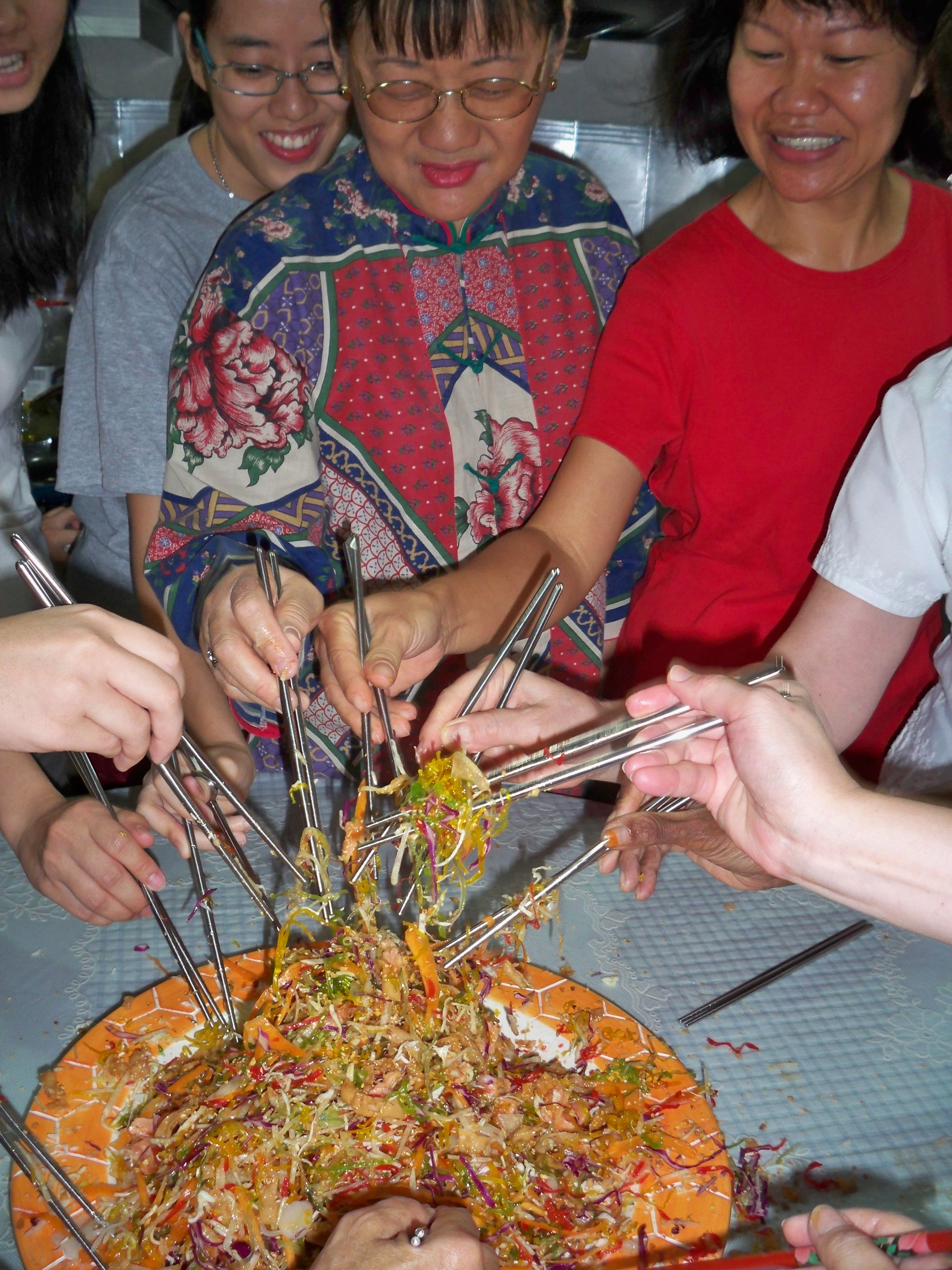
The tossing of yee sang

- Yam rice (Chinese: 芋頭飯) - savoury rice dish cooked with taro, Chinese sausage, chicken, dried prawns and mushrooms. It is often served as an accompaniment for dishes like bak kut teh or yong tau foo.
- Yusheng (Chinese: 魚生) - a festive raw fish salad, also pronounced "yee sang" (Jyutping: jyu4 saang1) in the Cantonese manner. While raw fish preparations are thought to have existed in China during antiquity and can be found in the Chaoshan region of Guangdong province in modern times, yusheng was created and developed separately in Seremban, Negeri Sembilan in the 1940s and in Singapore in 1964 when the republic was still a member state of the Federation of Malaysia. It consists of strips of raw fish tossed at the dining table with shredded vegetables, crispy tidbits and a combination of sauces and condiments. The name literally means "raw fish" but since "fish" (魚) is commonly conflated with its homophone "abundance" (餘), Yúshēng (魚生) is interpreted as a homophone for Yúshēng (余升), meaning "an increase in abundance". Therefore, yusheng is considered a symbol of abundance, prosperity and vigor. As a result, the mixing and tossing of yusheng with chopsticks and the subsequent consumption of the salad has become ritualised as part of the commemoration of Chinese New Year festivities in Malaysia and Singapore.
- Zongzi (Chinese: 粽子) - a traditional Chinese food made of glutinous rice stuffed with savoury or sweet fillings and wrapped in bamboo, reed, or other large flat leaves. They are cooked by steaming or boiling, and are a feature of the Duanwu festival, which is still celebrated by the Chinese communities in Southeast Asia.

== Chinese guo ==
Chinese kuih, written as "guo" (粿) or sometimes as "gao" (糕), are usually made from ground rice flours. Many of the kue are made especially for important festivities such as the Qingming Festival or Chinese New Year, however many others are consumed as main meals or snack on a daily basis. Example of these kue include:

- Nian gao (年糕): Known in the Hokkien language as "Ti Kueh" (甜粿)
- Caozai Guo (草仔粿): Pronounced in Hokkien as "Tsao wa kueh" (chháu-á-ké). Also known as "Tsukak kueh" (鼠麴粿, chhú-khak-ké) from the herb it is made from.
- Turnip cake (菜頭粿, 菜頭糕): Eaten straight, panfried, or stir-fried with egg as Chai tow kway.
- Taro cake (芋粿, 芋糕)
- Fun guo (粉粿)
- Red Tortoise Cake (紅龜粿) (Pronounced as Ang Ku Kueh)
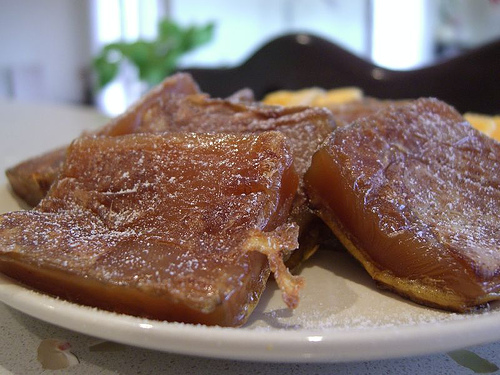
Cantonese pan-fried brown-sugar kueh

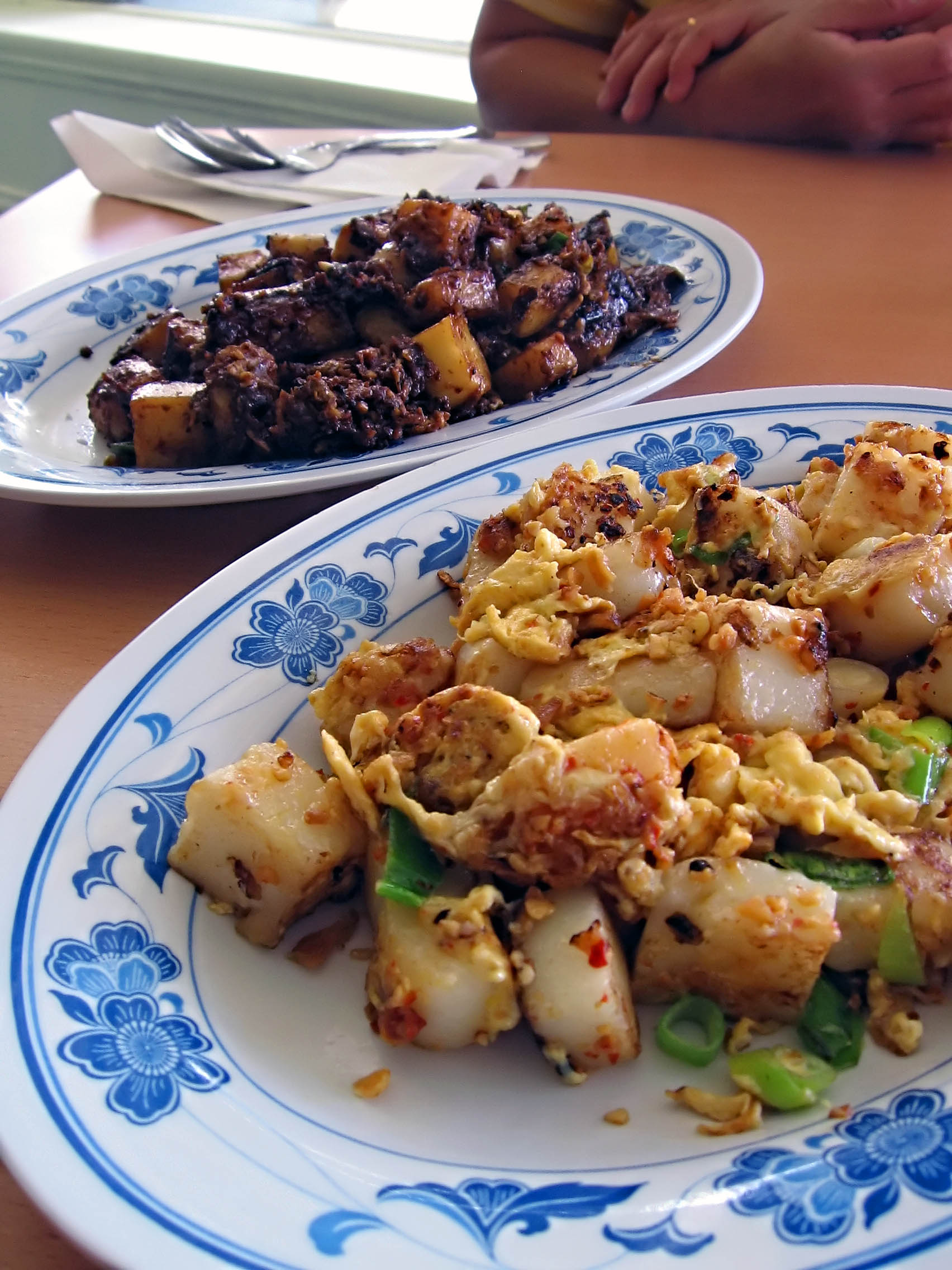
Chai tow kway stir-fried dark (with dark soy and molasses) or light (salt and fish sauce)

Many Chinese kue require the use of a Kue mould similar to that use in mooncakes, which is either carved out of wood or made of plastics. Kue moulds with turtles are ubiquitous, though moulds of peaches are usually quite common. Red coloured turtle kue are known especially as "Ang ku kueh"/"Red Tortoise Cake" (紅龜粿). Since many Chinese no longer make kue at home, these moulds have become less common in many kitchens.

== Desserts and sweets ==
- Leng chee kang (Chinese: 莲子羹) - a mixture of cooked ingredients immersed in a sweet soup. Ingredients vary greatly depending on the cook, but lotus seed is always the primary ingredient, and the soup may include dried longan, white fungus, barley, malva nut and rock sugar as secondary ingredients. Leng chee kang may be served warm or cold. It has also been introduced into Malay cuisine albeit misinterpreted as "laici kang" hence incorporating tinned lychees (laici).
- Mooncake (Chinese : 月饼) - round or rectangular pastries with a rich thick filling, traditionally eaten during the Mid-Autumn Festival and accompanied with Chinese tea. Both the traditional baked mooncake and the snow skin version are popular and widely available in Malaysia during the festival season.
- Muar chee (Chinese : 麻糍) - glutinous rice ball lumps coated in a sweetened mixture of pulverised peanuts and sesame seeds, and served with toothpicks.
- Tangyuan (Chinese : 汤圆 or 湯圓) - plain white or coloured sweet dumplings made from glutinous rice flour. Traditionally homemade and eaten during Yuanxiao (Chinese : 元宵) as well as the Dongzhi Festival (Chinese : 冬至), tangyuan is now available year around sold as dessert. Tangyuan dumplings with filling are usually served in a lightly sweetened clear syrup, while unfilled ones are served as part of a sweet dessert soup.
- Tau foo fah or Dau Huay (Chinese : 豆腐花 or 豆花) - a velvety pudding of very soft silken tofu, traditionally flavoured with a brown sugar syrup.
- UFO tart (Chinese : 牛屎堆) - this consists of a flat, thin base of baked mini butter sponge cake topped with a creamy egg custard, which is in turn crowned with a meringue slurry. Its name in Chinese has a literal means "cow pile dung", which alludes to the piped shape of the cake base's toppings and the meringue's darker shade as a result of caramelisation. Popularized by a Hainanese bakery in Sandakan in the 1950s, the popularity of these treats has spread to Kota Kinabalu and several other towns in Sabah.

== Vegetarian cuisine ==
Over 80% of Malaysian Chinese identify themselves as Buddhists, and some follow a vegetarian diet at least some of the time. Some Chinese restaurants offer an exclusively vegetarian menu (Chinese : 素食, 斎) featuring Chinese dishes which resemble meat dishes in look and even taste, like "roast pork", fried "fish" with "skin" and "bones", and "chicken drumsticks" complete with a "bone". These vegetarian restaurants are run by proprietors who abstain from consumption of animal products as well as strong tasting vegetables and spices as way of life for religious reasons, and are essentially vegan. The meat analogues used are often locally produced as opposed to imported, and are made solely from ingredients like soy, gluten, mushrooms and tuber vegetables. Buddhist vegetarian restaurants are likely to be found in areas with a high concentration of Chinese, and tend to be especially busy on certain festive days where many Buddhists temporarily adopt a strict vegetarian diet for at least a day.
