= Lomi =

Filipino noodle dish

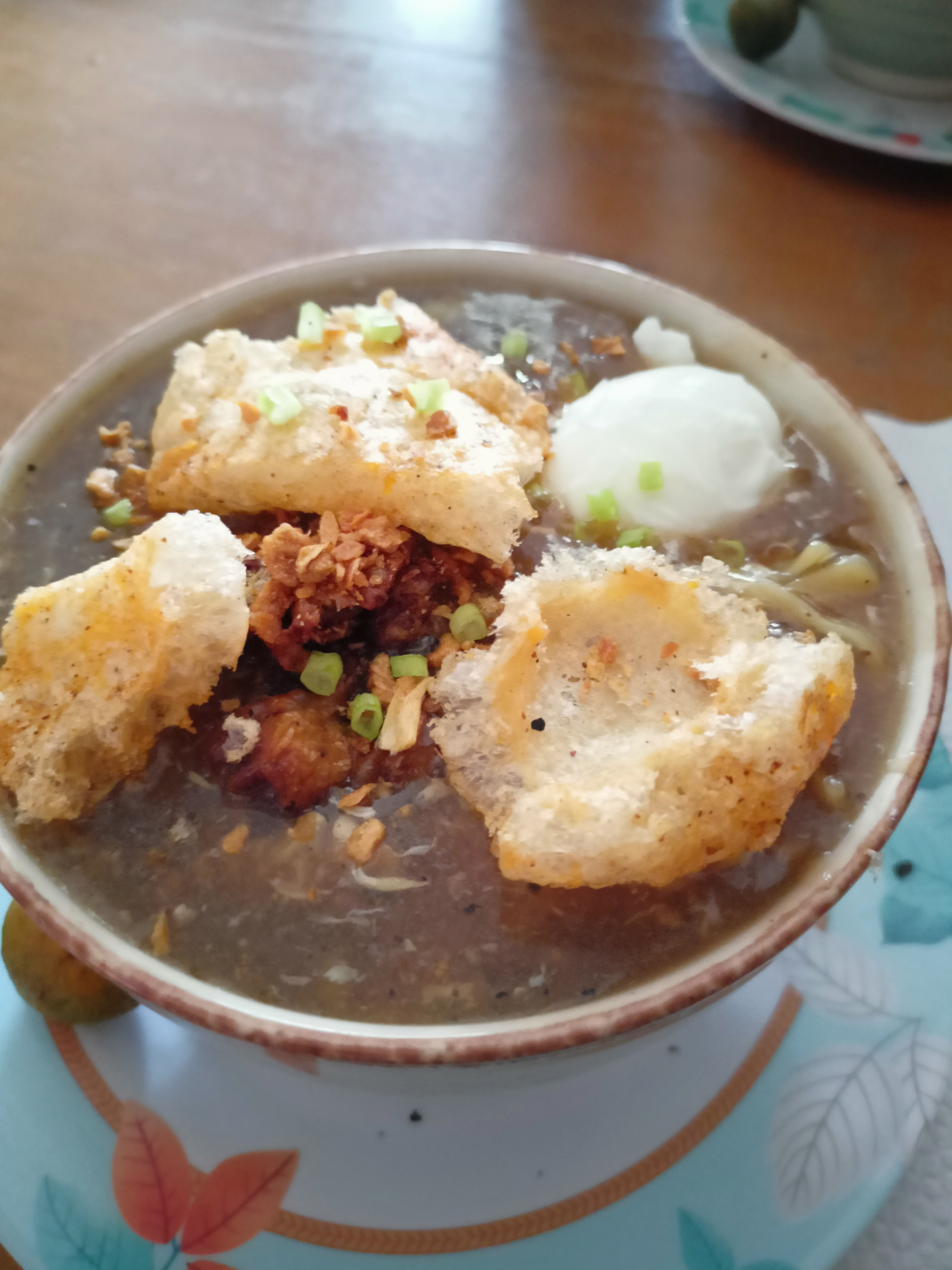
- Batangas lomi
- Course: Main
- Place of origin: Philippines
- Region or state: Originally from manila
- Created by: Chinese
- Main ingredients: thick flat yellow noodles, meat, soup stock, thick gravy
- Variations: Loming Batangas
- Similar dishes: Lor mee
- Other information: Adopted by Batangas

Lomi or pancit lomi (Hokkien Chinese: 滷麵 / 扁食滷麵; Pe̍h-ōe-jī: ló͘-mī / pán-si̍t ló͘-mī) is a Filipino dish made with a variety of thick fresh egg noodles of about a quarter of an inch in diameter, soaked in lye water to give it more texture. Because of its popularity at least in the eastern part of Batangas, there are as many styles of cooking lomi as there are eateries, panciterias or restaurants offering the dish. Variations in recipes and quality are therefore very common.

== Recipe ==
Small portions of meat (usually pork, sometimes chicken) and pork liver are thinly sliced, then sauteed with garlic and shallots. It is cooked until tender before adding salt, finely ground black pepper and other seasonings. To prepare the broth, soup stock is added, followed by lomi noodles and chopped cabbage. To thicken the soup, a slurry of cornstarch and water is added. Finally, before the whole mixture is transferred to individual bowls, a beaten egg is added while the dish is being stirred continuously. Toppings include slices of kikiam (que-kiam), fish balls, sliced chives, cooked shrimp, and some meatballs. Sometimes stir-fried ground meat (pork or chicken), as well as coarsely ground garlic roasted to golden brown are also used.

Lomi is typically cooked using a deep wok on a LPG gas stove. It takes about 9–10 minutes to cook a single serving.

== Consumption ==
Lomi is best eaten while steaming hot. It is a challenge to finish eating before the bowl gets cold. To spice up the taste, depending on one's preference, a mixture of soy sauce, fish sauce, kalamansi juice, and crushed fresh red chili peppers can be added to the dish as a condiment. The same soy sauce mixture can also be used as a dipping sauce for the meatballs, Other lomi eaters request a small amount of finely chopped fresh red onions to be eaten with the dish for extra pungency.

== Availability ==
Lomi haus or lomián, panciteria, eatery, carinderia, restaurant or their combination (e.g., lomi haus and eatery) are the most common terms used in Batangas to refer to a food establishment where lomi is served or eaten.

A lomi haus specializes in lomi and other pancit dishes made of fresh egg noodles called miki. It may also serve other pancit dishes, such as pancit guisado, bihon, miki-bihon, chami, pancit canton, sotanghon and others if available.

A panciteria has a more extensive menu of pancit dishes. It serves lomi and other pancit dishes such as pancit guisado, bihon, mike-bihon, chami, pancit canton, sotanghon and others. Rice meals, viands and other made-to-order dishes may also be served here if available.

An eatery or carinderia or restaurant principally serves rice meals, viands and other made-to-order dishes that may or may not include lomi. In eastern Batangas, lomi will always be included in the menu, however. Other food establishments where lomi may be served are luncheonettes and fast food centers.

== See also ==
- Lor mee, Fujianese predecessor
  - Hokkien mee of Malaysia and Singapore
- Cuisine of the Philippines
  - Filipino Chinese cuisine
  - Pancit
