= Penang cuisine =

Distinctive cuisine of the Malaysian state of Penang

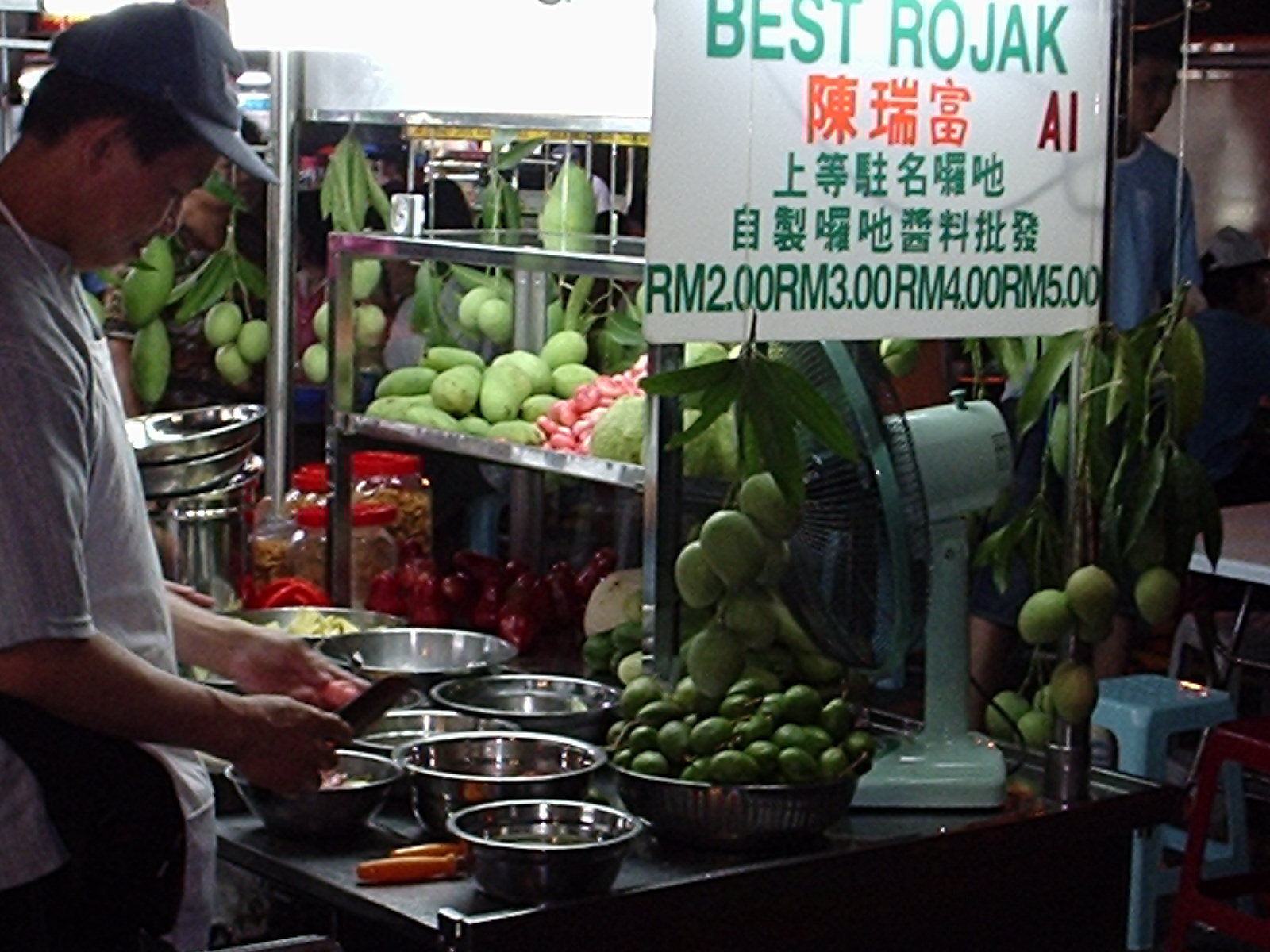
A hawker stall selling rojak, a fruit dish in shrimp and chilli paste

Penang cuisine is the cuisine of the multicultural society of Penang, Malaysia. Most of these cuisine are sold at road-side stalls, known as "hawker food" and colloquially as "muckan carts". Local Penangites typically find these hawker fares cheaper and easier to eat out at due to the ubiquitousness of the hawker stalls and that they are open for much of the day and night. On February 22, 2013, Penang was ranked by CNN Travel as one of the top ten street food cities in Asia. Penang has also been voted by Lonely Planet as the top culinary destination in 2014.

== Snacks ==
=== Indian ===
- Apom (Tamil: அப்பம்)—Indian-style pancake with a thin skin. It is crispy outside but soft and thick in the middle. Unlike apom balik (ban chean kuih), it has no fillings.
- Appalam (Tamil: அப்பளம்)—a thin, crisp disc-shaped cracker typically based on a seasoned dough made from black gram (urad flour), fried or cooked with dry heat. Flours made from other sources such as lentils, chickpeas, rice, or potato, can be used.
- Samosa (Tamil: சமோசா)—fried or baked pastry with a savoury filling, such as spiced potatoes, onions, peas, lentils, macaroni, noodles, and/or minced meat
- Bhajji (Tamil: பஜ்ஜி)—a spicy Indian snack similar to a fritter.
- Vadai (Tamil:வடை)

=== Chinese ===
- Eu char kuih (Chinese: 油炸粿) - Chinese-style deep-fried bread sticks usually eaten with congee or almond cream.
- Lor bak (鹵肉) - marinated minced pork, rolled in thin soybean sheets and then deep-fried. Usually served with a small bowl of loh (a thick broth thickened with corn-starch and beaten eggs) and chili sauce.
- Phong pneah (Chinese: 清糖餅) - Chinese light brown pastry filled with melted white sugar.

=== Peranakan ===
- Popiah (Chinese: 薄餅) - Teochew style spring roll with a filling which consists of turnip, beancurd, egg bits and a dash of chilli paste and sweet sauce.

=== Malay ===
- Otak-otak - fresh fish fillets are blended with light spices, coconut milk, kaffir lime leaves and other aromatic herbs, into a sort of fish mousse. The fish mousse is wrapped in banana leaves and steamed or grilled. It is stated that the dish originated from Johor.

== Main dishes ==
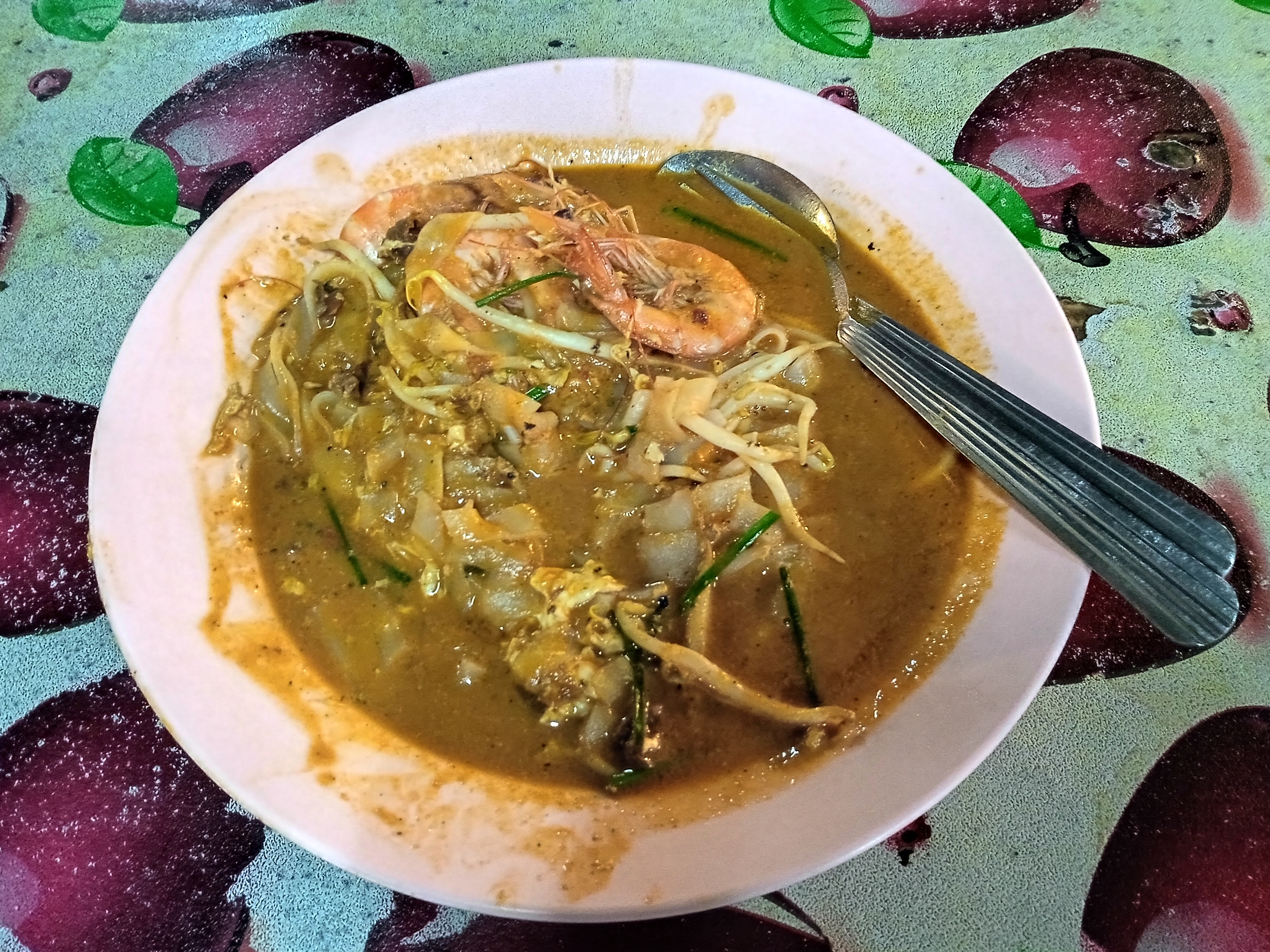
Char kway teow

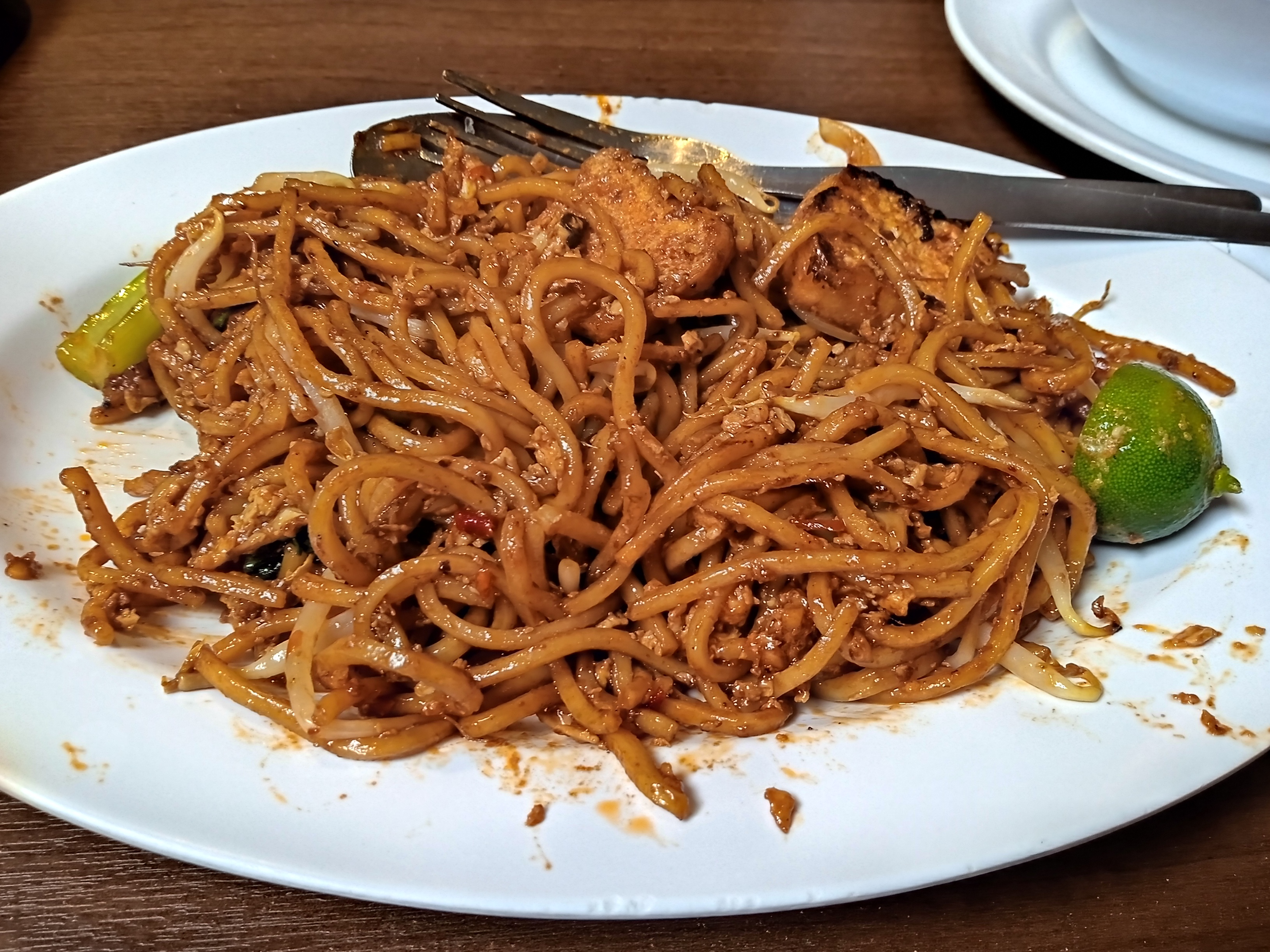
Mee goreng mamak

- Banana leaf rice (Tamil: வாழையிலைச் சோறு கறி) - white rice (or parboiled rice in authentic South Indian restaurants) is served on a banana leaf with an assortment of vegetables, curried meat or fish, pickles, and/or papadum. Is very much part of the few favourite local food in Penang particularly along Little India within the George Town Heritage zone.
- Satti sorru (Tamik:சட்டி சோற்று or சட்டி சோற்று) - also known as Indian claypot rice.Gravy from a curry is mixed into rice, to clean out the pan or the wok the curry was cooked in.
- Biryani (Tamil: பிரியாணி) - also known as nasi beriani and has many different variant.
- Fish head curry (Tamil: மீன் தலை கறி) - head of the red snapper stewed with vegetables such as okra, tomato and brinjals in a curry, usually served with rice. Passion of Kerala at New World Park, Burmah Road, is famous for this dish.
- Mee Goreng Mamak (Tamil: மாமா வறுத்த மி) - it is made with thin yellow noodles fried with garlic, onion or shallots, fried prawn, chicken, chili, tofu, vegetables, tomatoes, egg and spices, giving this fried noodle dish a distinctly unique Indian flavor.
- Mee Rebus (Tamil: அவித்த மி) - a rich gravy made out of sweet potatoes, is ladled over fresh yellow egg noodles and bean sprouts. It is garnished with cooked squid, prawn fritters, boiled egg and fried shallots. A squeeze of a fresh local lime before serving.
- Nasi Kandar (Tamil: நாசிக் கண்டார்) - a meal of steamed rice which can be plain or mildly flavoured, and served with a variety of curries and side dishes . Among the most well-known is a place called Line Clear, off Penang Road.
- Pasembur (Tamil: பசெம்பூர்) - a spicy salad dish consists of fried titbits and shreded vegetable sold by Indian Muslims.
- Penang Acar (Tamil: பினாங்கு ஊறுகாய்) - Indian pickles. Known as Urukai in Tamil language, made from certain individual varieties of vegetables and fruits that are chopped into small pieces and cooked in edible oils like sesame oil or brine with many different spices
- Bak kut teh (Chinese: 肉骨茶) - literally translates as "meat bone tea", the soup dish consists of meaty pork ribs and meatballs simmered in a complex broth of herbs and spices.
- Bee Tai Bak or Mee Tai Mak (Chinese: 米苔目) - silver needle noodles served with clear soup and minced pork.
- Char koay kak (Chinese: 炒粿角) - stir-fried rice cake.
- Char koay teow (Chinese: 炒粿條) - fried flat rice noodles with chilli spices with seafood typically prawns and cockles (and typically with fried eggs). (A stall at a corner along Chulia Street which uses distinctive narrower noodles than other vendors.)
- Claypot chicken rice (Chinese: 砂煲飯) - another popular hawker food in Penang comprises chicken cooked in a claypot over a fire, served with Chinese sausages, egg, salted fish and mushroom.
- Duck soup noodles (Chinese: 鴨腿麵線) - a complex savoury herbal soup served with Thin vermicelli and topped with a duck drumstick.
- Fried Oyster Omelette or Oh Chien (Chinese: 蚵煎) - an oyster omelette dish available at many hawker stalls and coffee shops in Penang. Garnished with coriander or parsley, the omelette is served with a dip made of chilli sauce and garlic paste.
- Hainanese chicken rice (Chinese: 海南雞飯) - a dish of Hainanese origin consists of rice cooked in chicken stock, and served with either roasted or steamed chicken, sometimes with sliced cucumber, bean sprout, spring onions and parsley.
- Hokkien mee or Hae Mee (Chinese: 福建麵 in Penang, 虾面 in Kuala Lumpur) - rice and egg noodles, served together with hard boiled eggs, small prawns, meat slices, bean sprouts and kangkung (water spinach) in a spicy prawn & pig bone (Chinese: 肉骨) stock.
- Lor mee (Chinese: 鹵麵) - rice and egg noodles in broth thickened with corn starch and beaten eggs, served with eggs (some feature duck eggs), meat slices and bean sprouts. The noteworthy stall is located next to the Goddess of Mercy Temple, with branches in Jones Road and Pulau Tikus.
- Penang Laksa (Malay: Laksa Pulau Pinang), a dish of thick round rice noodles in a spicy and sour tamarind-based (or assam fruit-based) fish soup. The dish is garnished with mint, cucumber, onions, shreadded lettuce and pineapple.
- Nasi Lemuni - A rice dish that blended with daun lemuni, garlic, ginger, fenugreek, lemongrass, onion and salt.

== Dessert ==
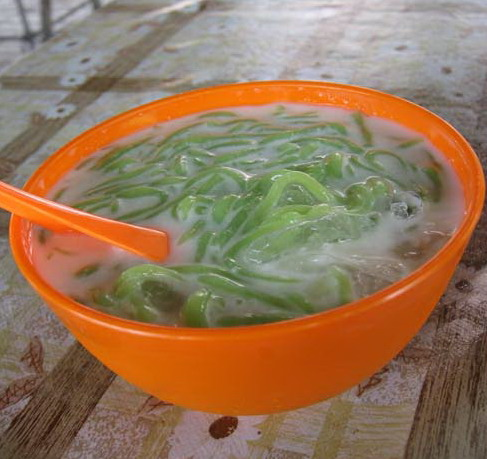
Cendol

- Almond cream - a local dessert available at Restoran Traditional Home of Dessert along Kimberley Street which has been operating at the road side stall for three decades. It is usually served with eu char koay (fried bread fritters).
- Cendol - a dessert with green noodles in coconut milk, brown sugar and shaved ice.
- Tau Foo Fah or Tau Hua (Chinese: 豆腐花) - Chinese pudding made with soft tofu in sugar syrup.
- Ice kacang (Malay: Ais Kacang) - sweet red beans, seaweed jelly, barley pearls, sweet corn and fruits are covered with shaved ice, then laced with rose syrup, brown sugar syrup and sweetened condensed milk.
- Pulut tai tai - a Nyonya glutinous rice dessert usually served with kaya.
- Rojak - a fruit and vegetable dish in shrimp and chilli paste.
