= Tambun biscuit =

Delicacy of Penang, Malaysia

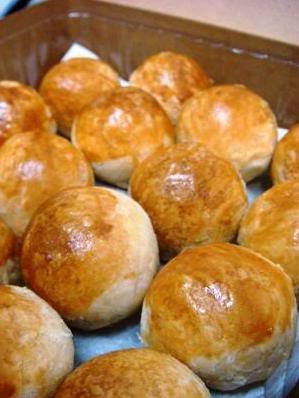
Tambun biscuits

Tambun biscuits (Chinese: 淡汶餅; Tâi-lô: Tām-būn-piánn), or tau sar pneah (Chinese: 豆沙餅; Tâi-lô: tāu-sa-piánn), are a popular delicacy in Penang, Malaysia. They are baked in an oven and made of a flaky pastry generally stuffed with mung bean paste (tau sar), although variations such as pandan exist; the filling can be sweet or savory.

== Gallery ==
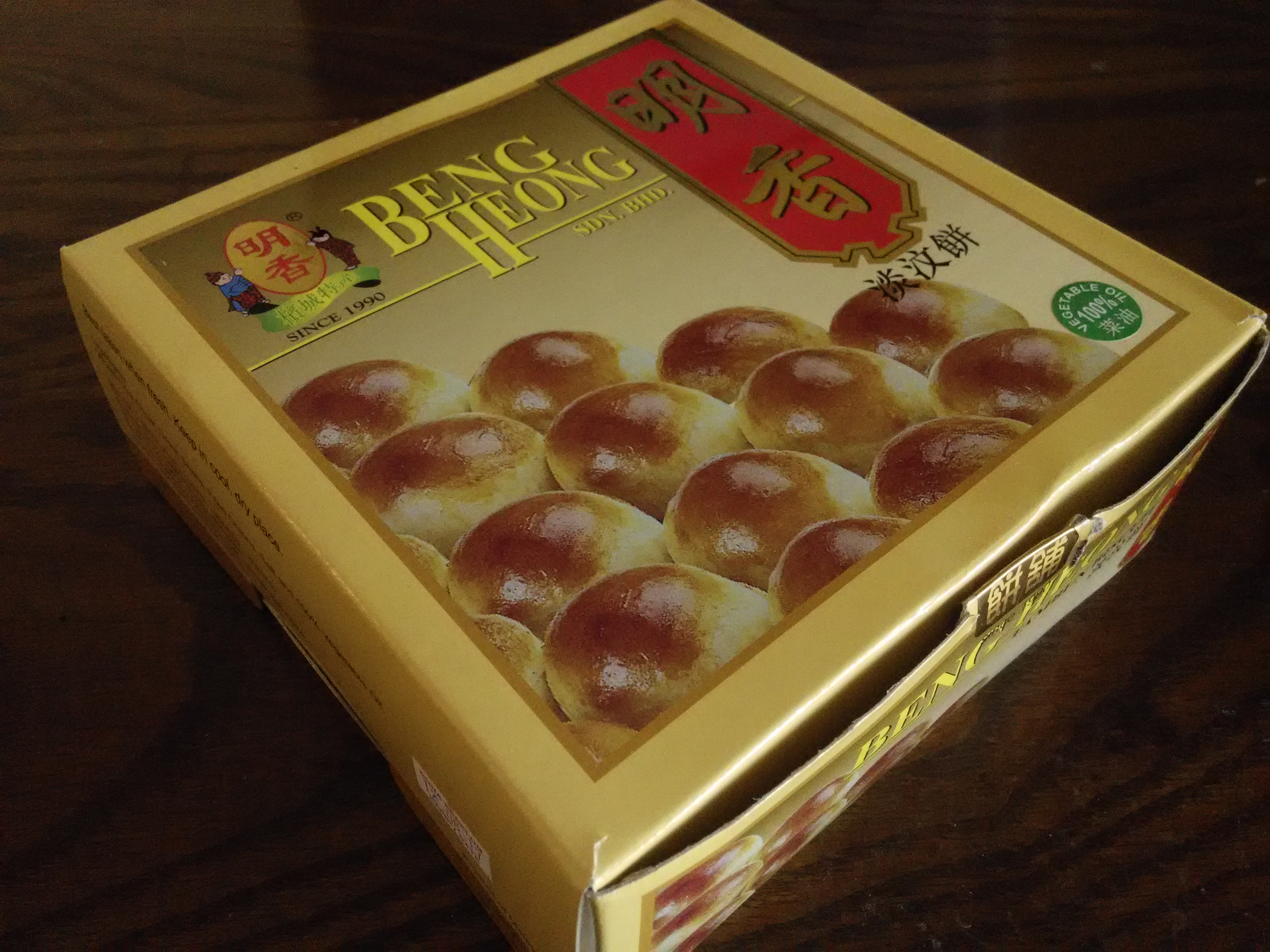

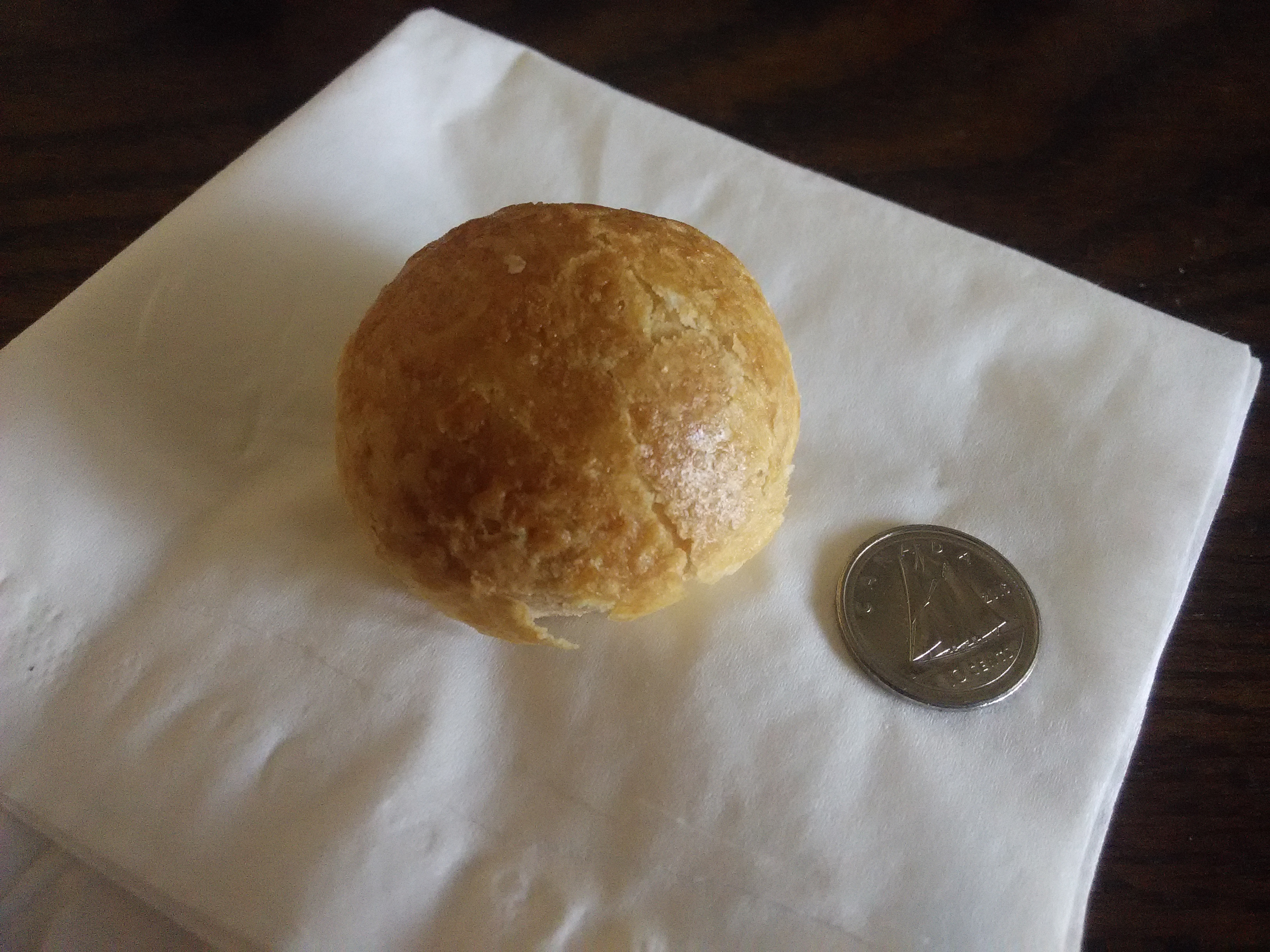
A tambun biscuit, with coin for scale

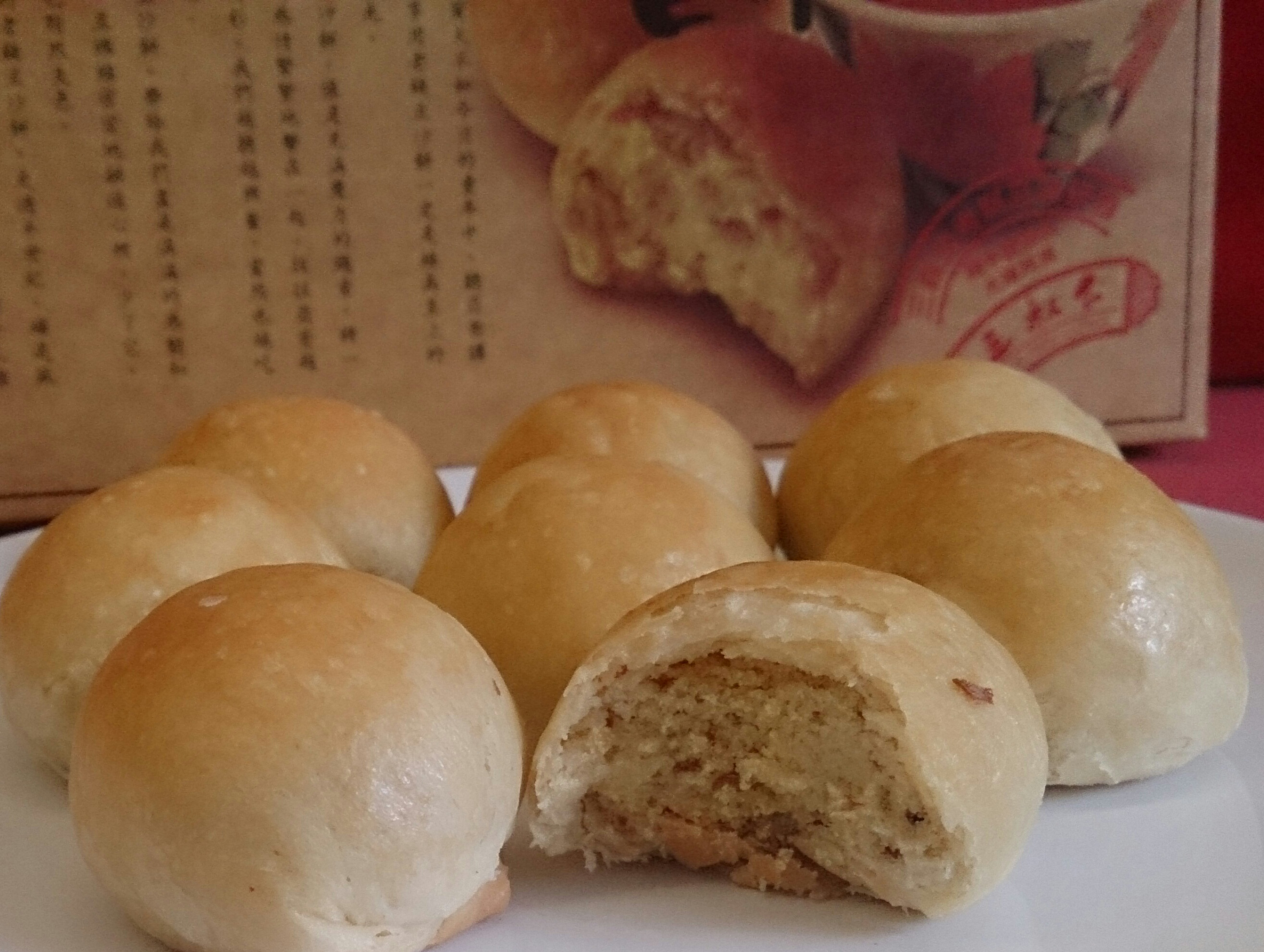

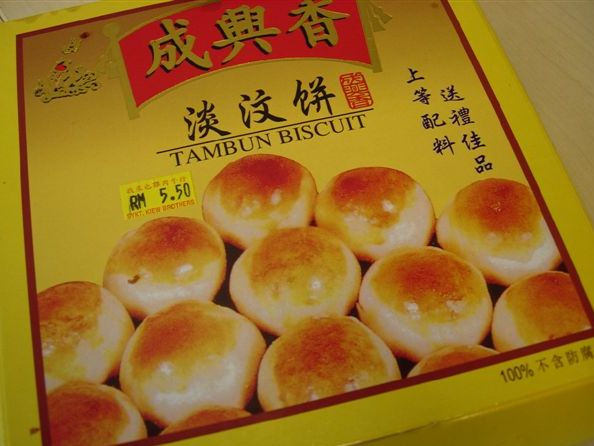

== See also ==
- Malaysian Chinese cuisine
- Penang cuisine
