= Lor mee =

Hokkien noodle dish from Zhangzhou, China

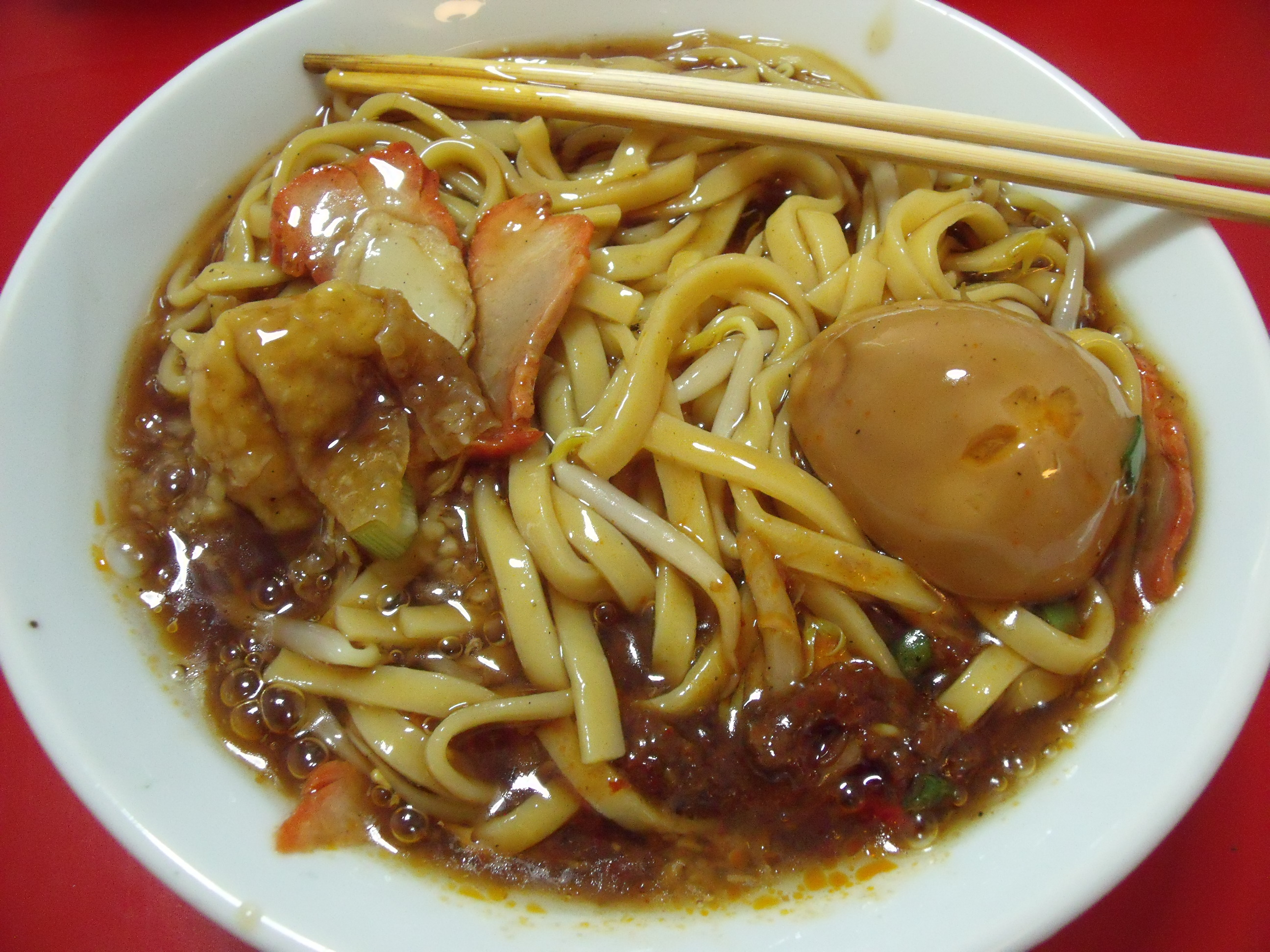
- Lor mee sold in Bukit Batok, Singapore
- Course: Main
- Place of origin: China
- Region or state: China, Indonesia, Malaysia, Myanmar, Philippines, Singapore, Thailand
- Main ingredients: thick flat yellow noodles, ngo hiang, fish cake, fish, round and flat meat dumplings (usually chicken or pork), half a boiled egg, thick gravy
- Similar dishes: Lomi

Lor mee (Hokkien Chinese: 滷麵; Pe̍h-ōe-jī: ló͘-mī, Mandarin simplified Chinese: 卤面; traditional Chinese: 滷麵; pinyin: lǔmiàn; literally: "thick soya sauce gravy noodles") is a Chinese Hokkien noodle dish from Zhangzhou served in a thick starchy gravy. Variants of the dish are also eaten by Hokkiens (Min Nan speakers) in Singapore, Indonesia, Malaysia and Thailand.

The "r" in the name is not pronounced, it indicates a short vowel in non-rhotic English. In the Philippines, the local variant is called lomi or pancit lomi.

Two restaurants specializing in lor mee were selected in the 2025 Michelin Guide for Singapore. Lor mee is described by Singapore Government 101 as a popular hawker dish in Singapore.

== Cooking and Ingredients ==
The thick gravy is made of corn starch, spices, meat, seafoods and eggs. The ingredients added into the noodles are usually ngo hiang, fish cake, fish, round and flat meat dumplings (usually chicken or pork), half a boiled egg, and other items depending on the stall and the price paid. Vinegar and garlic can be added as an optional item. Lor mee can be served together with red chili. Traditional versions also include bits of fried fish as topping though few stalls serve this version anymore.

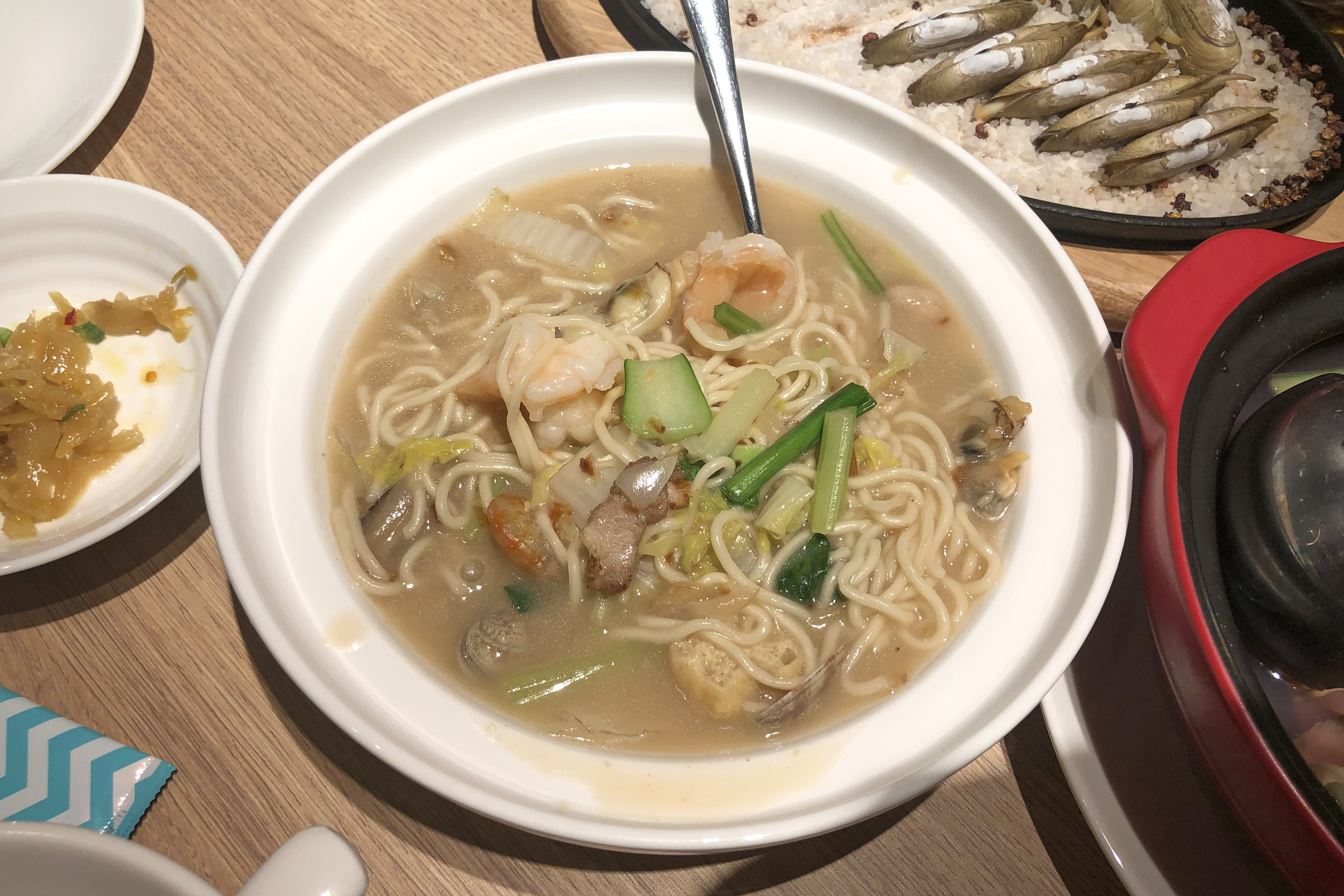
Putian-style lor mee

In Putian cuisine, lor mee is a much lighter dish usually prepared with less starch and seafood instead of meat.

In the Singapore style, the gravy is built by simmering pork or chicken bones, then thickened with tapioca or corn starch and seasoned with five-spice powder, cinnamon, and star anise. Beaten egg is streamed in at the end to add body and silkiness. To complement the savoury flavours, customers typically add a drizzle of black vinegar (usually Chinkiang), minced garlic, and, for spice lovers, a dollop of sambal chilli.The black vinegar serves to cut through the richness of the thick gravy.

== Regional variations ==
The Penang version, locally called "Loh Mee," uses a lighter chicken stock base and typically combines yellow wheat noodles with thin bee hoon rice noodles. Its gravy is scented with Chinese five-spice and flavoured with soy sauce and eggs, but is generally less dark and heavy than the Singapore variant.

In Malaysia, popular toppings include slices of pork, tofu, fish cakes, and eggs, whereas in Singapore, ngoh hiang is a more characteristic topping.

The Philippine variant lomi was created by Chinese immigrant To Kim Eng in Lipa City, Batangas. In 1968, he and his wife Natalia opened Lipa Panciteria, which is still considered by some as the home of the original lomi. The dish omits vegetables entirely and incorporates local ingredients such as pork liver and kikiam.

Hokkien mee, a series of noodle dishes found throughout Fujianese communities in Southeast Asia, are believed to originate from lor mee.

== Nutrition ==
According to a nutrition guide published by SingHealth's HealthXchange platform, this dish is low in energy and fat but high in sodium and cholesterol.

== Henan lumian ==
In central China's Henan cuisine, the same characters (Chinese: 河南卤面; pinyin: Hénán lǔmiàn) are used for an unrelated dish of wheat noodles traditionally prepared with a labor-intensive process of steaming, stir-frying and then steaming again.

== See also ==
- Mie kuah
- Chinese Indonesian cuisine
- Chinese Filipino cuisine
- Hokkien mee, a series of Singaporean and Malaysian noodle dishes descended from Fujian lor mee
- Malaysian cuisine
- Singaporean cuisine
- Thai cuisine
