= Hokkien mee =

Southeast Asian noodle dish

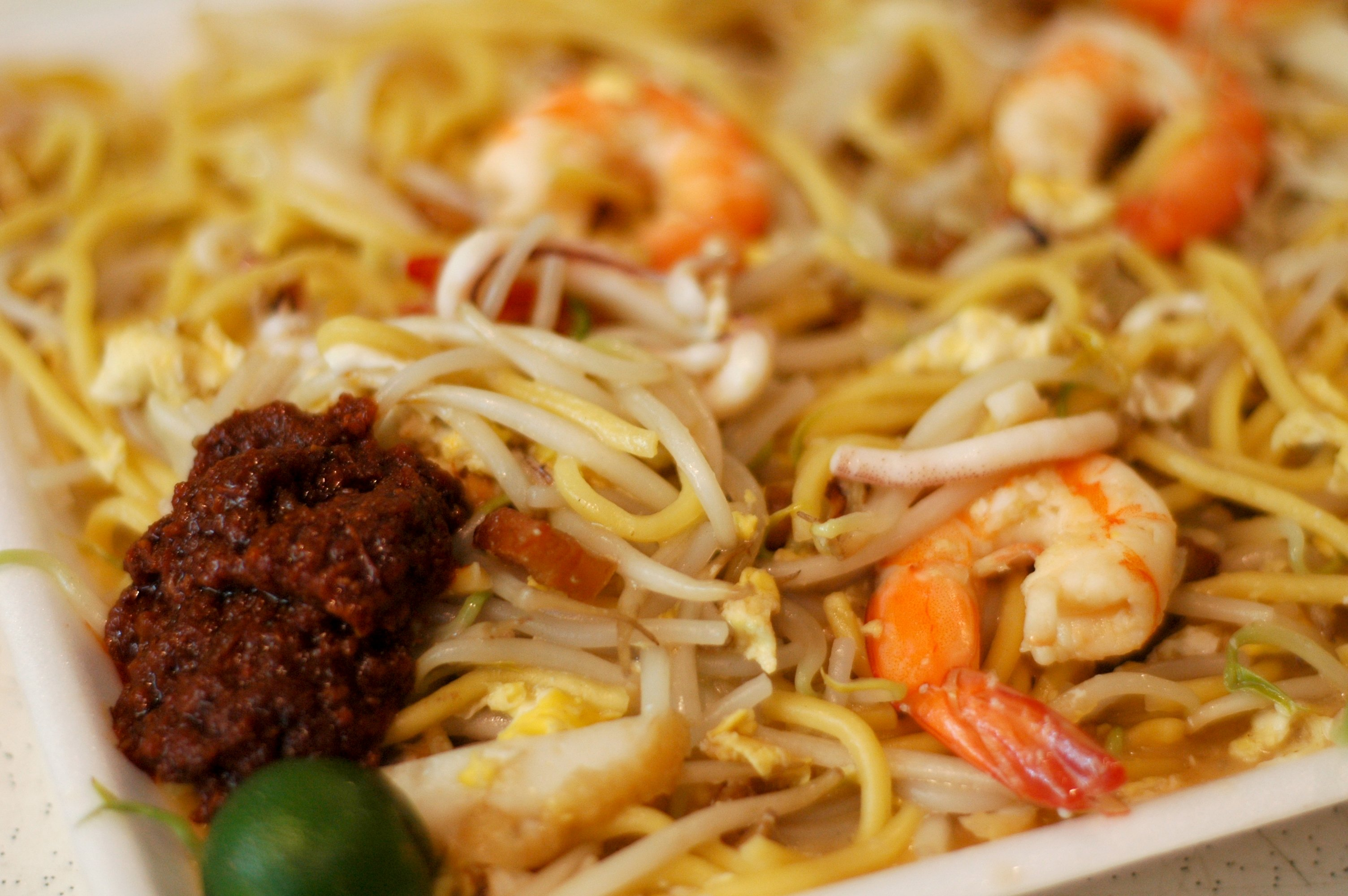
- Singaporean-style Hokkien mee
- Type: Noodle
- Place of origin: Fujian province, China
- Associated cuisine: Indonesia, Malaysia, Singapore
- Main ingredients: Egg noodles, rice noodles, egg, pork, prawn, squid
- Variations: Hokkien hae mee, Hokkien char mee

Hokkien mee
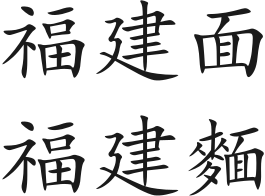
- Hokkien mee in Simplified Chinese (top) and Traditional Chinese (below) character
- Traditional Chinese: 福建麵
- Simplified Chinese: 福建面
- Hokkien POJ: Hok-kiàn mī
- Literal meaning: Hokkien noodles
Transcriptions
Standard Mandarin
- Hanyu Pinyin: Fújiàn miàn
Southern Min
- Hokkien POJ: Hok-kiàn mī

Hae mee
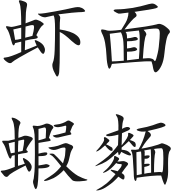
- Hae mee in Simplified Chinese (top) and Traditional Chinese (below) character
- Traditional Chinese: 蝦麵
- Simplified Chinese: 虾面
- Hokkien POJ: Hê-mī
- Literal meaning: Prawn noodles
Transcriptions
Standard Mandarin
- Hanyu Pinyin: xiāmiàn
Yue: Cantonese
- Yale Romanization: ha1 min6
Southern Min
- Hokkien POJ: Hê-mī

Hokkien mee, meaning "Fujian noodles" in Southern Min, is a group of related Southeast Asian dishes that have their origins in the cuisine of China's Fujian (Hokkien) province.

== Types ==
Hokkien mee can refer to five distinct dishes, with each being ubiquitous in specific localities in Singapore, Malaysia and Indonesia. The dishes are all indigenous to the region and not known in Fujian itself, although they are all thought to have descended from lor mee, a staple of Fujianese cooking.

Type	Singapore Hokkien mee (fried noodles)	Singapore hae mee (prawn noodles)	Penang Hokkien mee	Medan Hokkien mie	Hokkien char mee (fried noodles)
Origin	Singapore		Penang	Medan	Kuala Lumpur (Petaling Street/Pasar Seni)
Cooking method	Stir fried	Broth-based			Stir fried
Ingredients	Egg noodles and rice noodles			Egg noodles or fat yellow noodles	Fat yellow noodles
Ingredients	No dark soy sauce used				Dark soy sauce and caramel are used
Ingredients	Egg, prawn, squid, fish cake and pork, often with lard, limes and sambal on the side.	Prawn is the main ingredient with slices of chicken or pork, squid and fish cake.	Prawn is the main ingredient, with slices of chicken or pork, egg, kangkung and sambal added as well.	Egg, fish cake, fish ball, prawn ball, crab claw meat, cabbage, often with lard, slices of chicken or pork, sometimes oyster and slices of shiitake mushroom.	Slices of chicken or pork, squid and cabbage

=== Singapore Hokkien mee ===
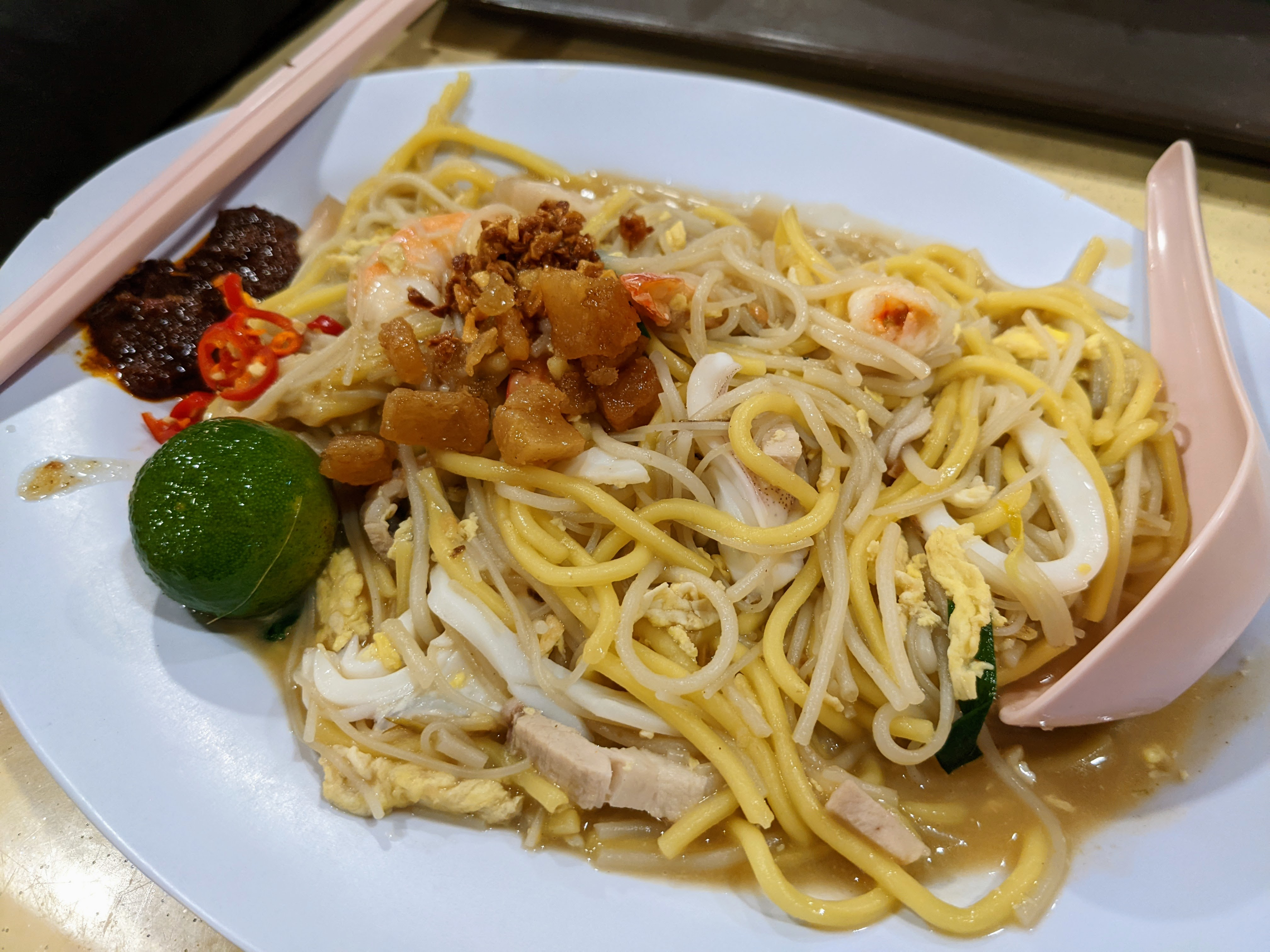
A plate of Singapore-style hokkien mee

In Singapore, Hokkien mee refers to a dish of egg noodles and rice noodles stir-fried with egg, slices of pork, prawns and squid. The key to the dish is copious quantities of an aromatic broth made from prawns and pork bones, slowly simmered for many hours. Sambal chilli and calamansi limes are served on the side for the diner to blend in, giving it an extra zing and tanginess. Traditionally, small cubes of fried pork lard are added, and some stalls also serve the dish on an opeh leaf (soft areca palm bark), which enhances the fragrance of the dish. Some also use garlic chive (koo chye) as an ingredient.

The Singaporean version of Hokkien mee was created after World War II by Chinese sailors from Fujian (Hokkien) province in southern China. After working in the factories, they would congregate along Rochor Road and fry excess noodles from the noodle factories over a charcoal stove. The dish is considered a classic of Singaporean cuisine and several hawker stalls selling it have been recognized by the Michelin Guide.

The dish is also known as "fried Hokkien noodles" (炒福建面), "Hokkien fried prawn noodles" (福建炒虾面), and particularly in Malaysia, "sotong mee" (squid noodles) to differentiate it from other types of Hokkien mee.

=== Penang Hokkien mee (noodle soup) ===
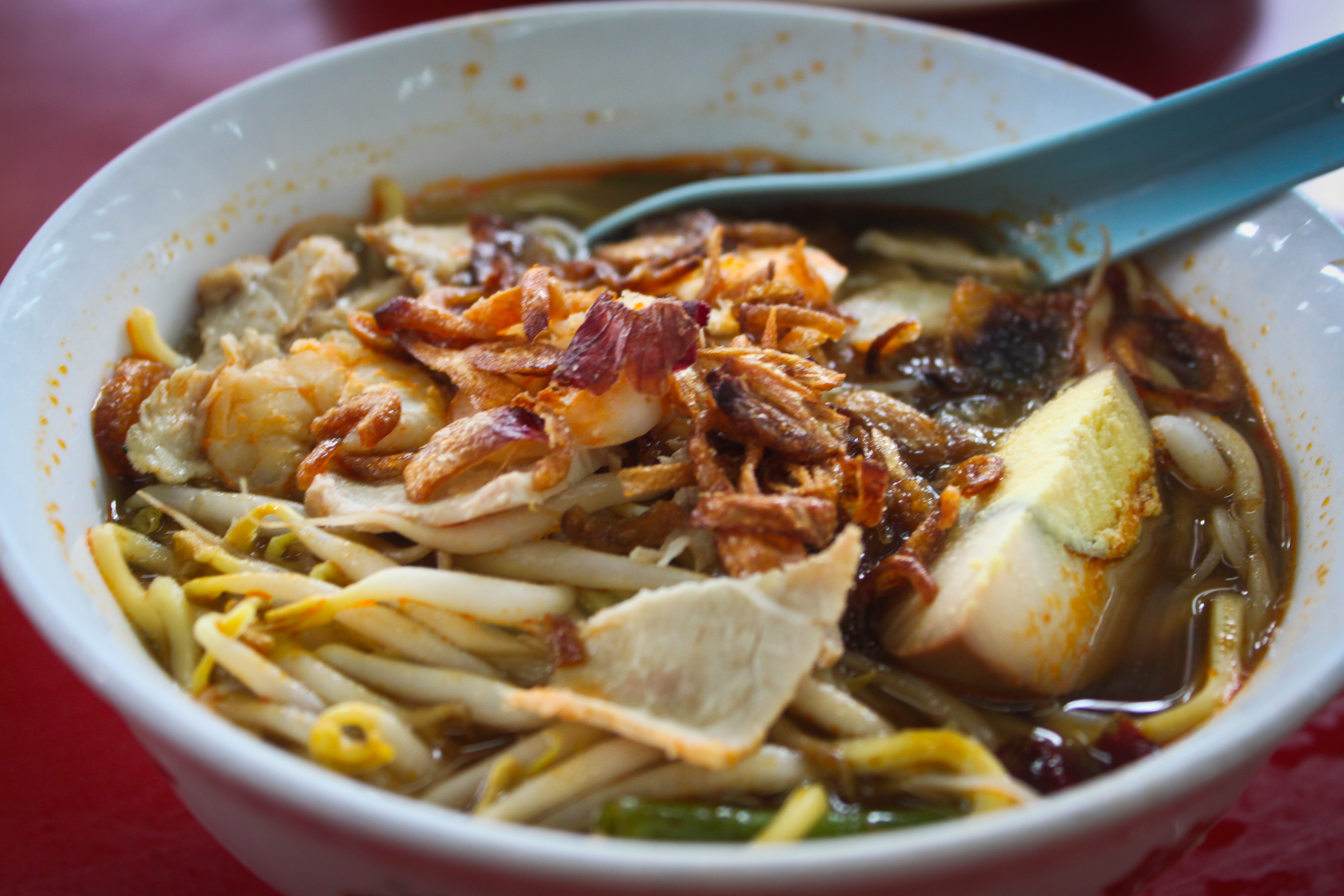
A bowl of Penang Hokkien mee

The Penang variant can be easily distinguished from the other variants by its characteristic spicy prawn broth. It primarily consists of rice vermicelli and thicker yellow egg noodles, while the broth is made with prawn heads and shells, and pork ribs. Sliced prawns or shrimps are also added into the dish, along with pork slices, hard boiled eggs, and kangkung (Ipomoea aquatica). Some Hokkien mee is served with bean sprouts, fried shallots, lard and sambal too. In Penang, pig skin, an ingredient rarely served in Kuala Lumpur, is a common topping as well.

Egg noodles are served in richly flavoured dark soup stock with prawns, pork slices, fish cake slices and bean sprouts, topped with fried shallots and scallion. The stock is made using dried shrimp, plucked heads of prawns, white pepper, garlic and other spices. Traditionally, lard is added to the soup, but this is now less common due to health concerns. A "dry" (without soup) version is also available; this version usually involves flavouring the noodles and toppings with vinegar, soy sauce, oil and chili, if desired. The dish is also usually served with freshly cut red chili slices in light soy sauce and lime juice.

To differentiate it from other types of Hokkien mee, the dish is also known as "Hokkien prawn noodles" (福建虾面), "Penang prawn noodles" (槟城虾面), and particularly among Cantonese speakers, simply "prawn noodles" (Chinese: 虾面; Pe̍h-ōe-jī: hê-mī; Jyutping: ha min6, also romanized as hae mee or har meen).

=== Singaporean prawn noodles (hae mee) ===
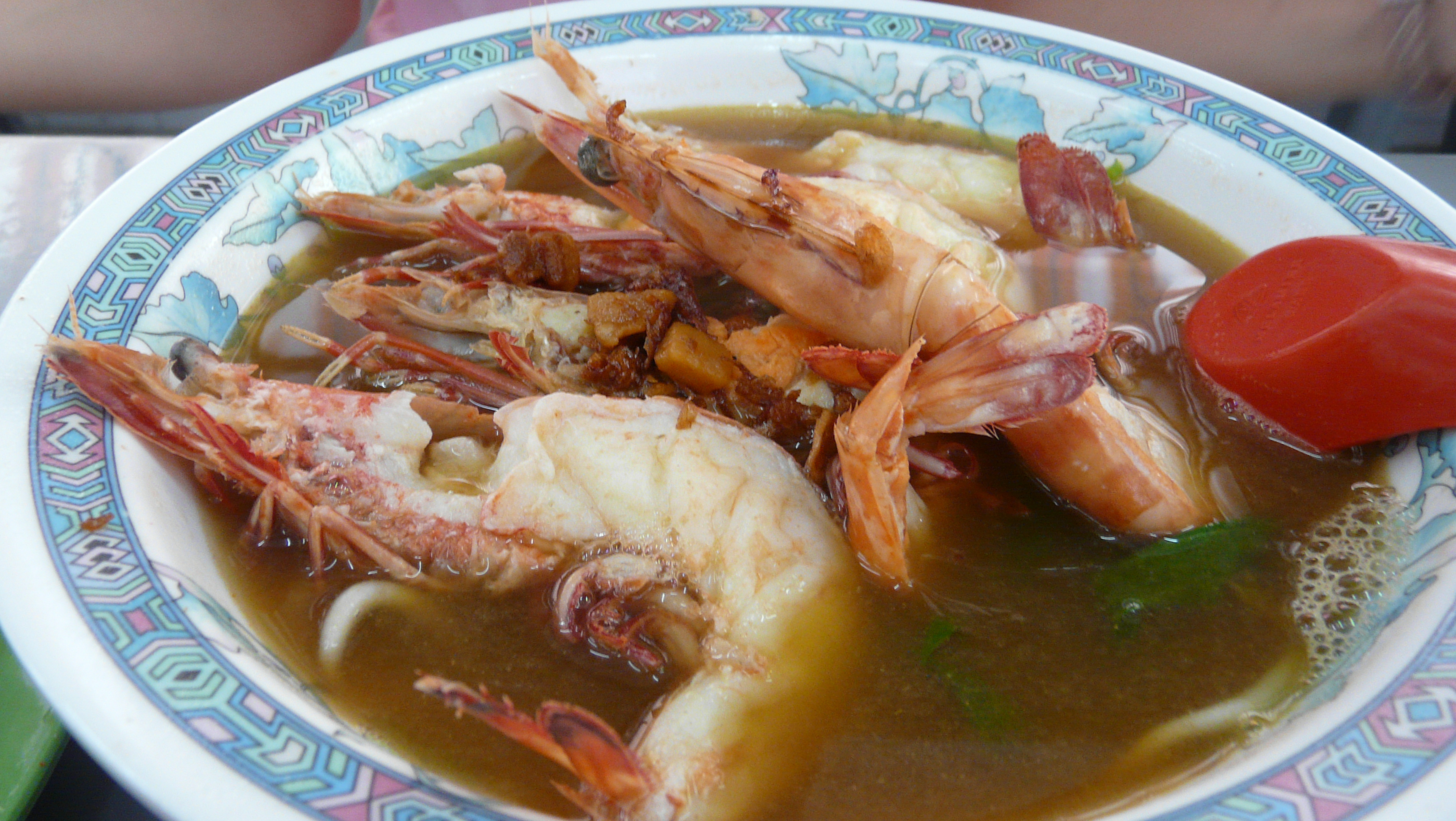
A bowl of Singaporean hae mee noodle soup

Another version of the dish called "prawn noodles" (虾面 hae mee) in Singapore is similar to the Penang variation of Hokkien mee. Egg noodles and rice noodles are served in richly flavoured dark soup stock with prawns, pork slices, fish cake slices, and bean sprouts topped with fried shallots and spring onion. The stock is made using dried shrimps, prawn heads, white pepper, garlic and other spices.

=== Medan Mie Hokkien ===
In Indonesia, Hokkien mee (known as Mie Hokkien) is associated particularly with the city of Medan on Sumatra. While the ingredients resemble the Singaporean version, instead of being stir-fried together, the ingredients are typically cooked separately and simply tossed together before serving.

=== Hokkien char mee ===
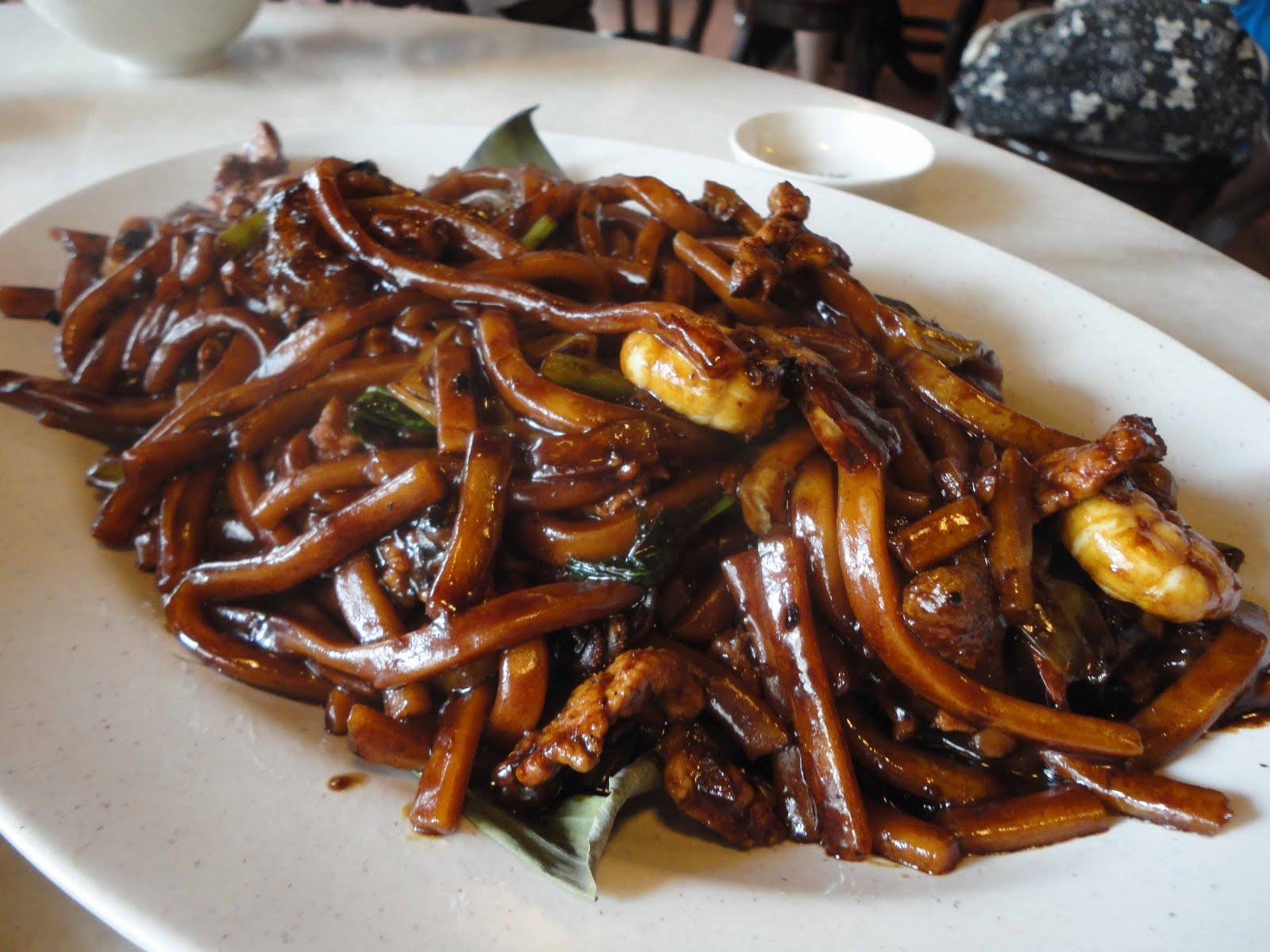
A plate of Kuala Lumpur-style hokkien mee

Hokkien char mee (Hokkien fried noodles; 福建炒麵) is served in Kuala Lumpur and the surrounding region. It is a dish of thick yellow noodles braised in thick dark soy sauce with pork, squid, fish cake and cabbage as the main ingredients and cubes of pork fat fried until crispy (sometimes pork liver is included). The best examples are usually cooked over a raging charcoal fire. This dish originated from a hawker stall chef, Ong Kim Lian, at Petaling Street in 1927.

== See also ==
- Indonesian cuisine
- Malaysian cuisine
- Singaporean cuisine
- List of noodle dishes
- Rice noodles
