= Pancit =

Filipino fried noodle dish

Pansit
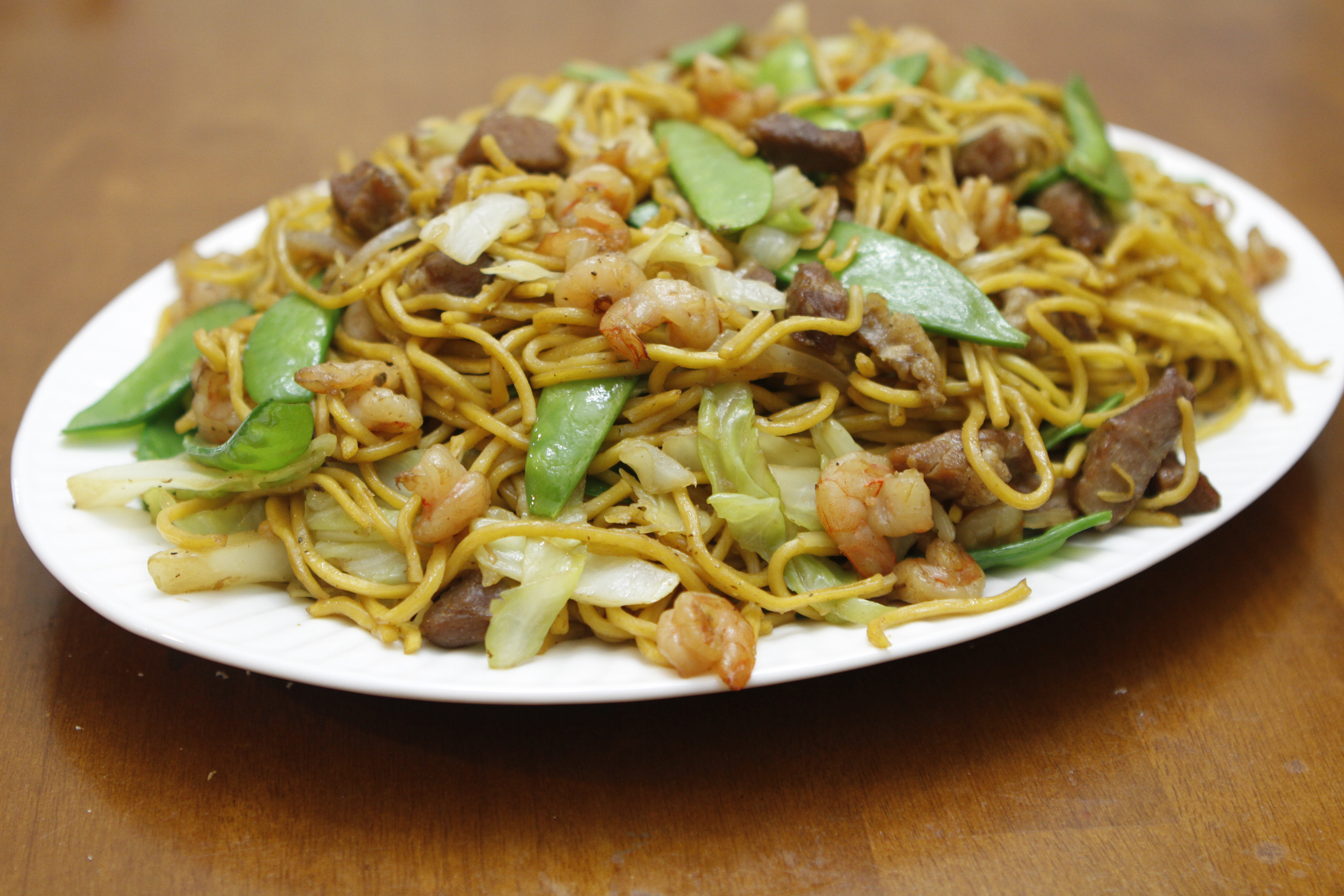
- Pancit canton, the most popular type of pancit
- Alternative names: Pansít
- Type: Noodle
- Place of origin: Philippines

Pancit (Tagalog pronunciation: [panˈsɪt] pan-SIT), also spelled pansit, is a general term referring to various traditional noodle dishes in Filipino cuisine. There are numerous types of pancit, often named based on the noodles used, method of cooking, place of origin or the ingredients. Most pancit dishes are served with calamansi, which adds a citrusy flavor.

Noodles were introduced to the Philippines by Chinese immigrants. They have been fully adopted and nativized into the local cuisine, also incorporating Spanish influences. There are numerous regional types of pancit throughout the Philippines, usually differing on the available indigenous ingredients. Some variants do not use noodles at all, but instead substitute it with strips of coconut, young papaya, mung bean sprouts, bamboo shoots, 'takway' (pansít ng bukid, lit. "pansít of the field") or seaweed.

== Description ==
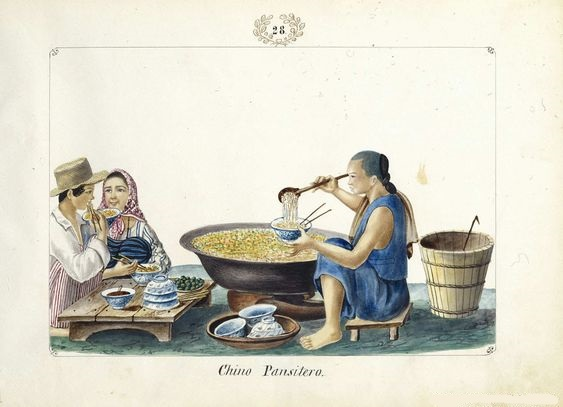
Chino Pansitero, an illustration by José Honorato Lozano of a pancit vendor in the Philippines (c. 1847)

The term pancit (or the standardized but less common pansít) is derived from either the Philippine Hokkien terms 扁食 (Pe̍h-ōe-jī: pán-si̍t/pián-si̍t; lit. 'wonton (noodles)') or 便的食 (Pe̍h-ōe-jī: piân-ê-si̍t/pân-si̍t; lit. 'convenient food'). In the Filipino language, pancit is the generic word for noodles. Different kinds of noodles can be found in Filipino supermarkets which can then be cooked at home. Noodle dishes are also standard fare in local restaurants, with establishments specializing in them called panciterias or pancitans.

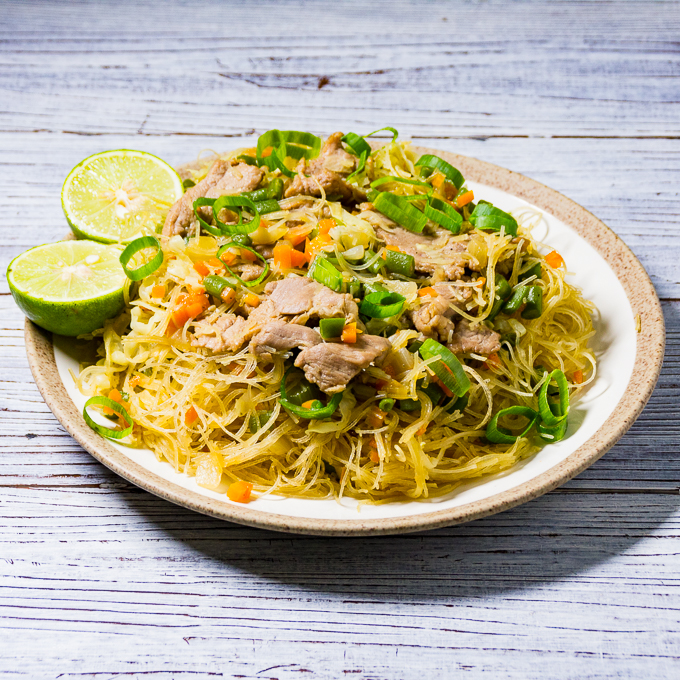
Pancit bihon guisado served with calamansi

Pancit has evolved in Filipino cuisine to combine both Chinese and Spanish techniques, as well as use local ingredients. Pancit is most commonly cooked by sautéing (guisado in Philippine Spanish) them with garlic, onions, vegetables (commonly carrots, green beans, cabbage, bell peppers, chayote, bottle gourd, patola, oyster mushrooms, and cauliflower, among others), and meat (including different kinds of Philippine longganisas) or seafood (including shrimp, fish, squid, crab, oysters, clams, and fish balls). Rarer ingredients include kamias, coconut milk, banana blossoms, mustard greens, okra, calabaza, tengang daga mushrooms, and shitake mushrooms. The ingredients of the sauce varies by recipe. These ingredients include soy sauce (or salt), vinegar, fish sauce (patis), bagoong alamang (shrimp paste), taba ng talangka (crab fat), oyster sauce, bugnay wine, fermented soy bean paste, and various sweet sauces (including inihaw sauces).

They can also be cooked in a broth or braised. Almost all pancit dishes are also uniquely served with sliced halves of calamansi, meant to be squeezed over the noodles (at the consumer's discretion) as the juice adds a tangy sourness. The most common other garnishings and condiments are flaked smoked fish (tinapa), fried garlic, crumbled pork cracklings (chicharon), labuyo chilis, shallots, ground black pepper, glutinous rice okoy, kinchay, peanuts, and sliced hard-boiled eggs. Some regions may also add sliced bilimbi fruits (kamias).

Pancit dishes are generally named after the types of noodles used. The most commonly used noodles are canton (egg noodles, usually round), bihon (rice vermicelli), lomi (thick egg noodles), miki (soft yellow egg noodles, usually square in cross-section), misua or miswa (wheat vermicelli), palabok (yellow cornstarch noodles), sotanghon (glass noodles), and odong (yellow flour noodles). They can also be named after their method of cooking, their origin, and their main ingredients.

Types of pancit noodles

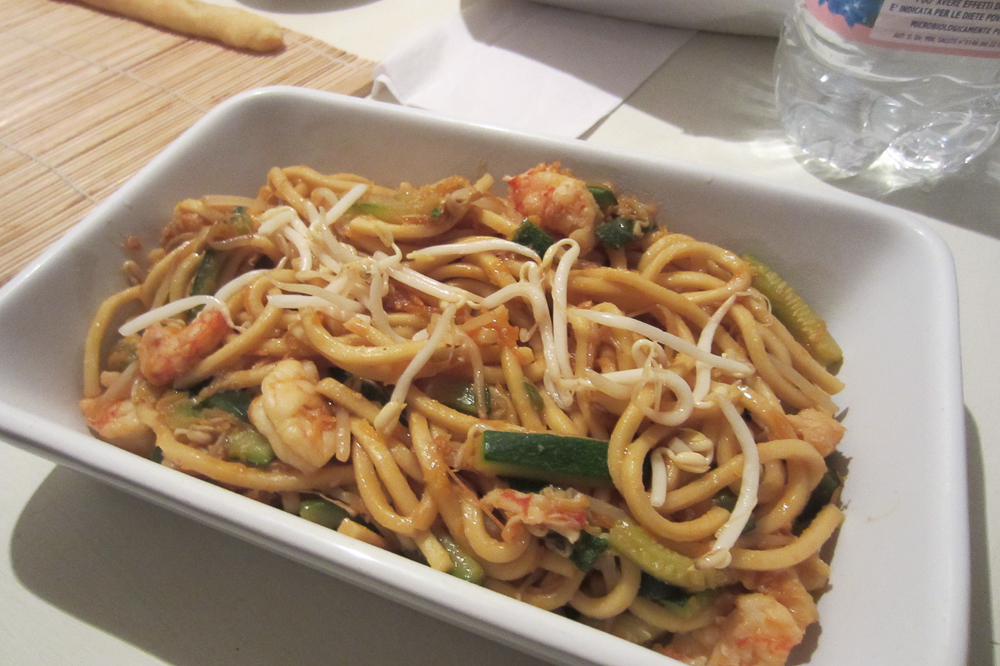
Canton (egg noodles, usually round)

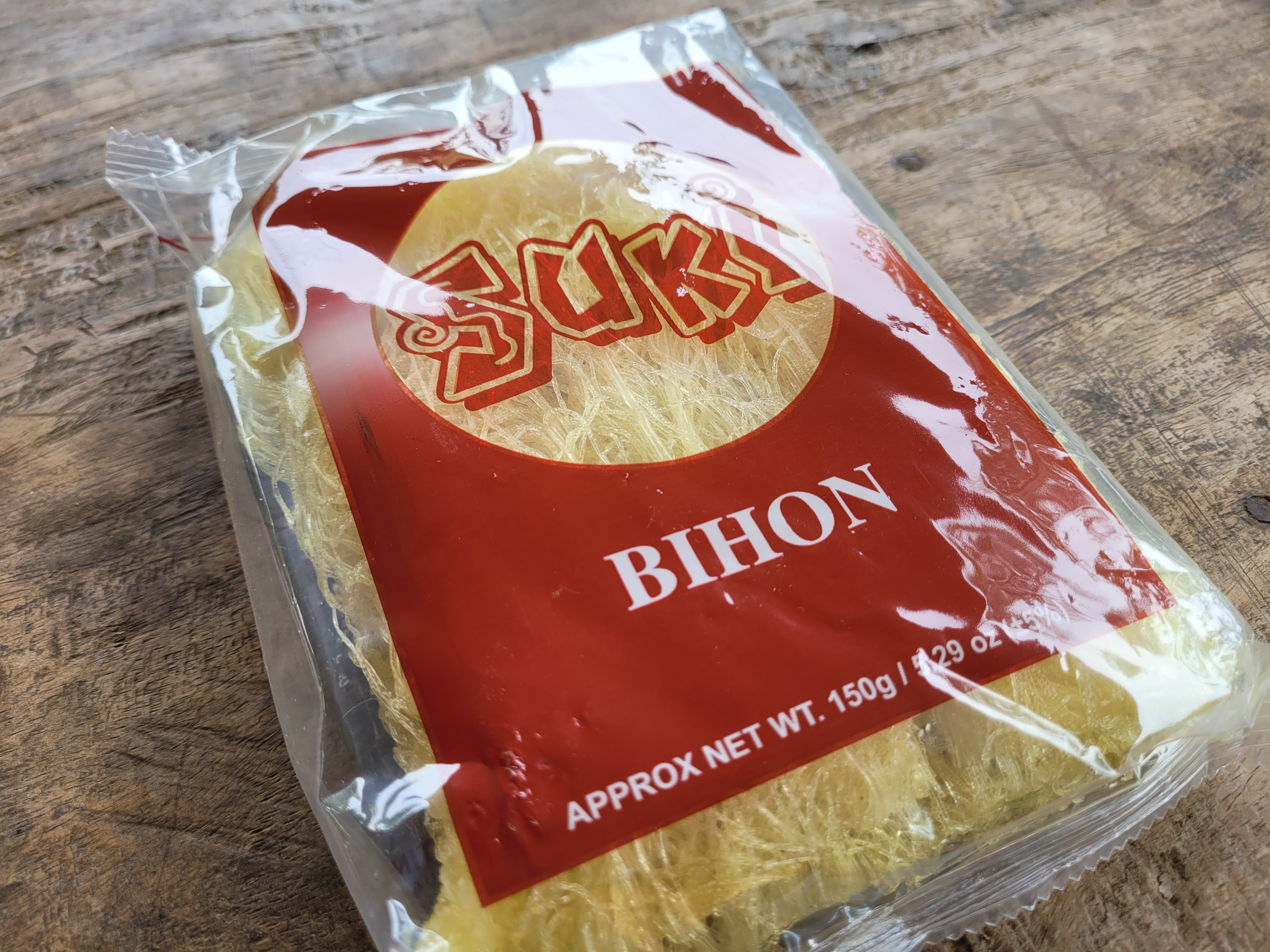
Bihon (rice vermicelli)

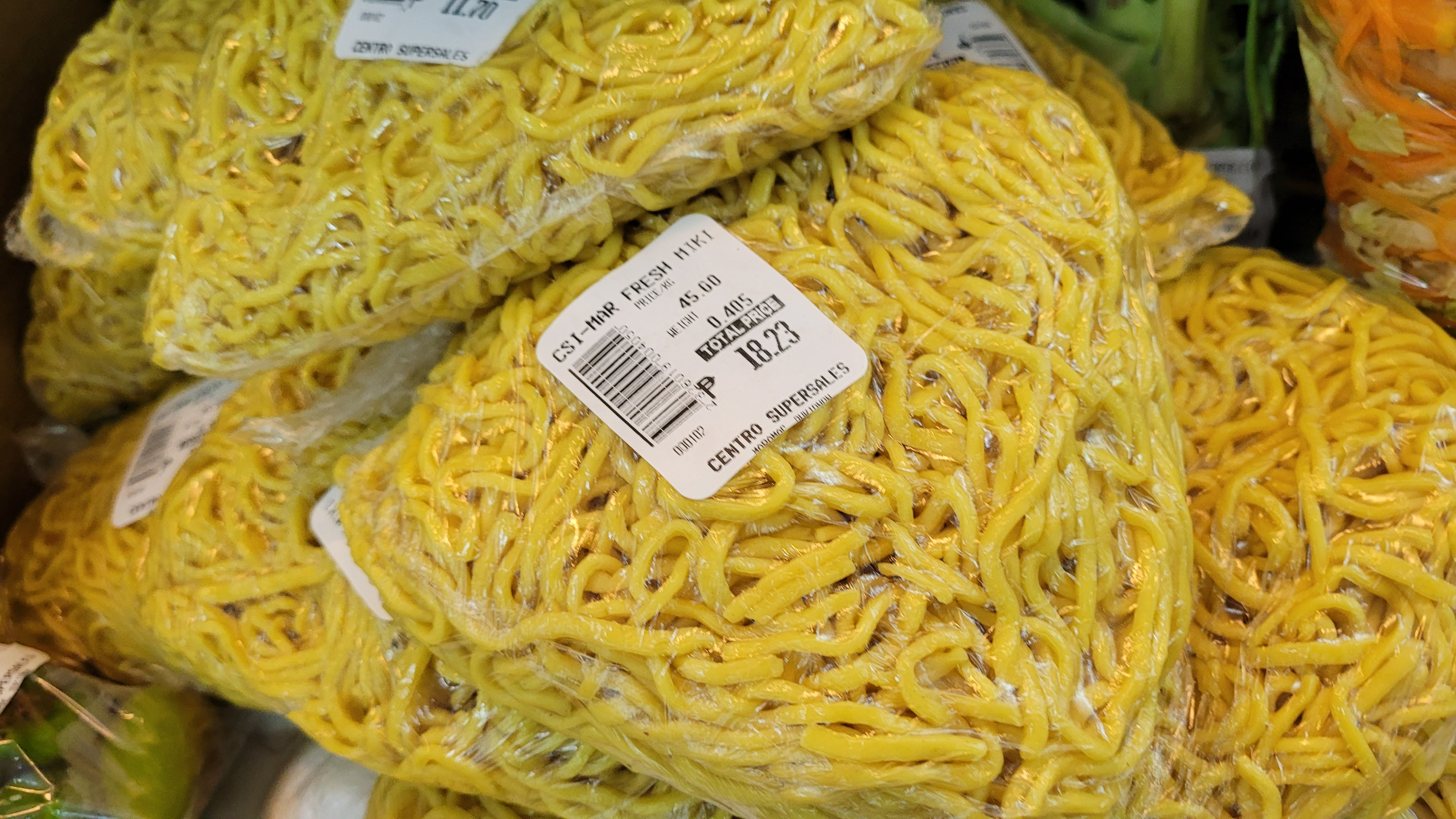
Miki (soft yellow egg noodles, usually squarish)

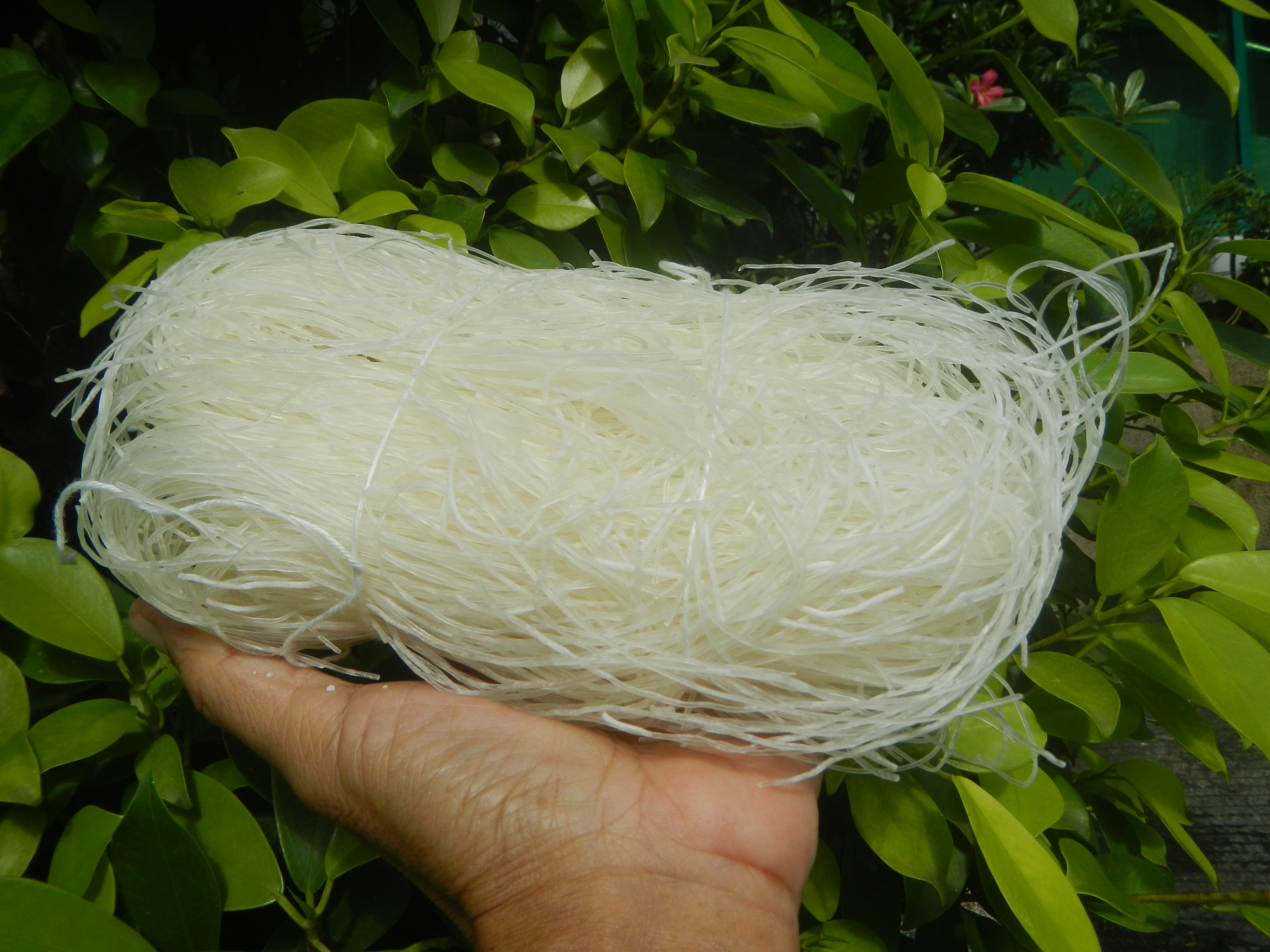
Sotanghon (bean vermicelli)

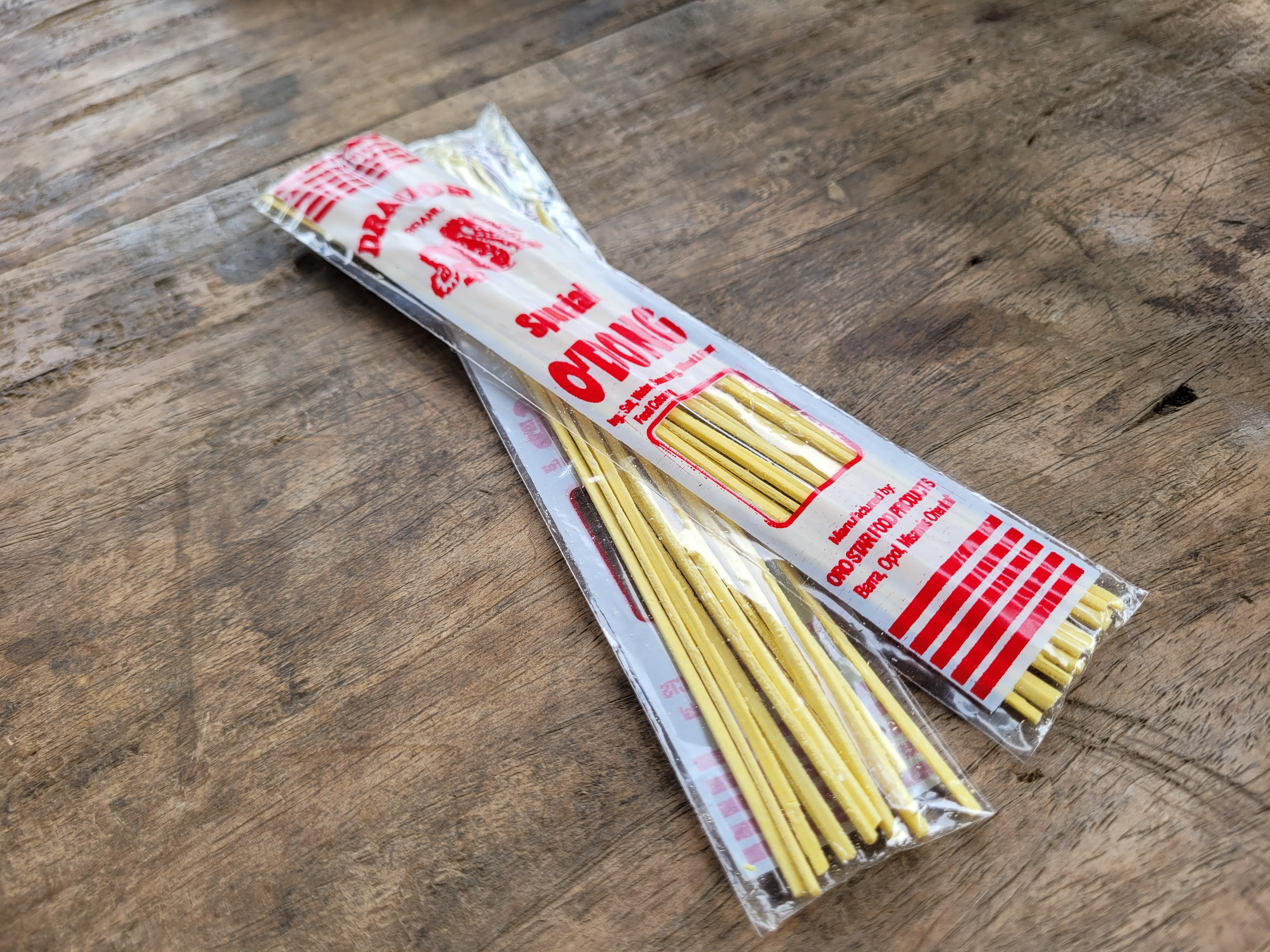
Odong (yellow flour noodles)

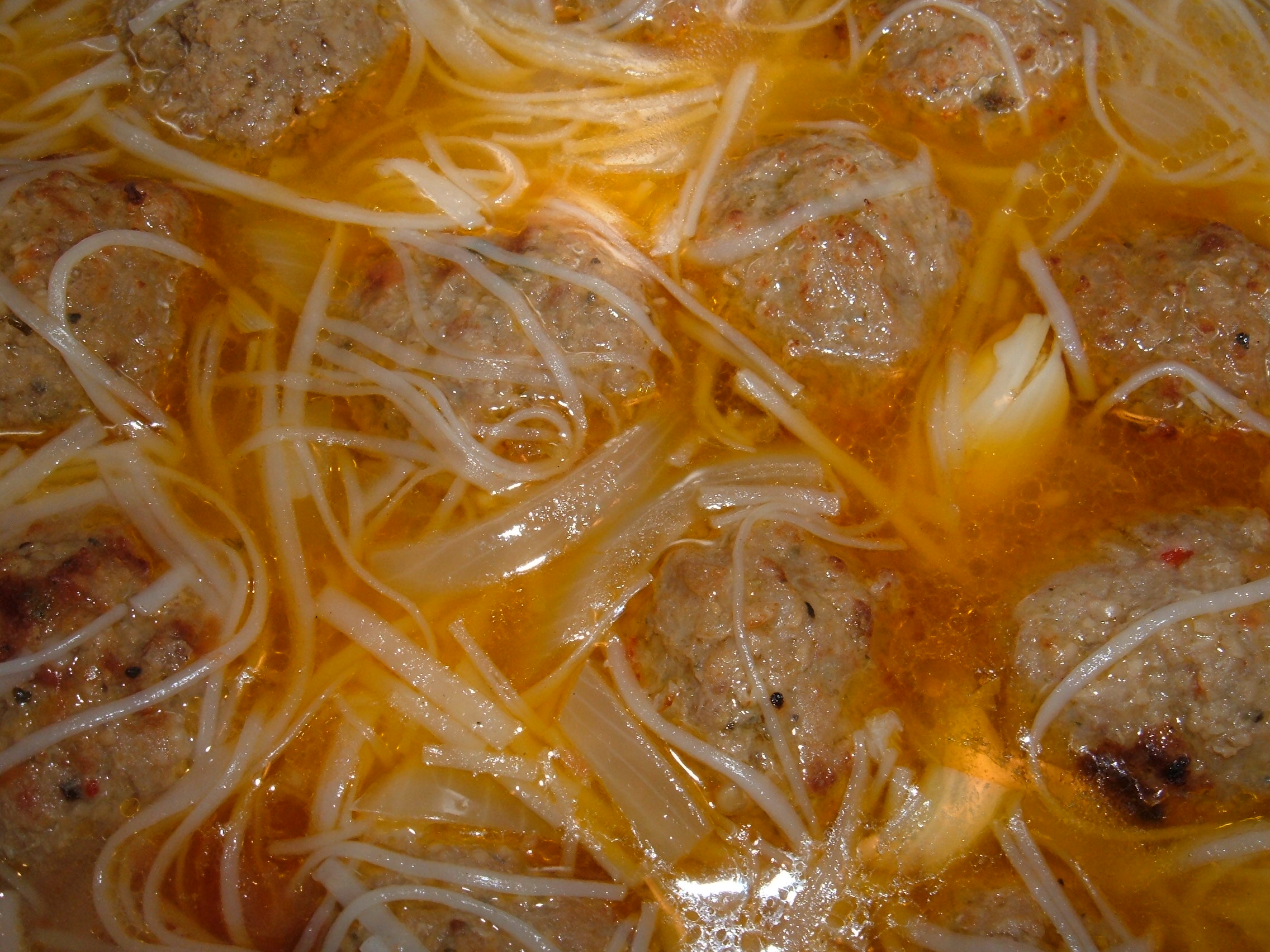
Misua or miswa (wheat vermicelli)

Pancit is considered both an everyday staple and a comfort food. Pancit can be eaten alone, but they are also frequently eaten paired with white rice, bread (usually pandesal), and puto (steamed rice cakes). Pancit dishes are commonly served during gatherings, events festivals, and religious activities, due to the ease in which they can be cooked in large quantities. Pancit is also commonly served at birthday celebrations and Chinese restaurants nationwide often have "birthday noodles" listed on the menu, as the length of the noodles are believed to symbolize a long life. This belief originates in Chinese Filipino customs.

== Pancit dishes ==
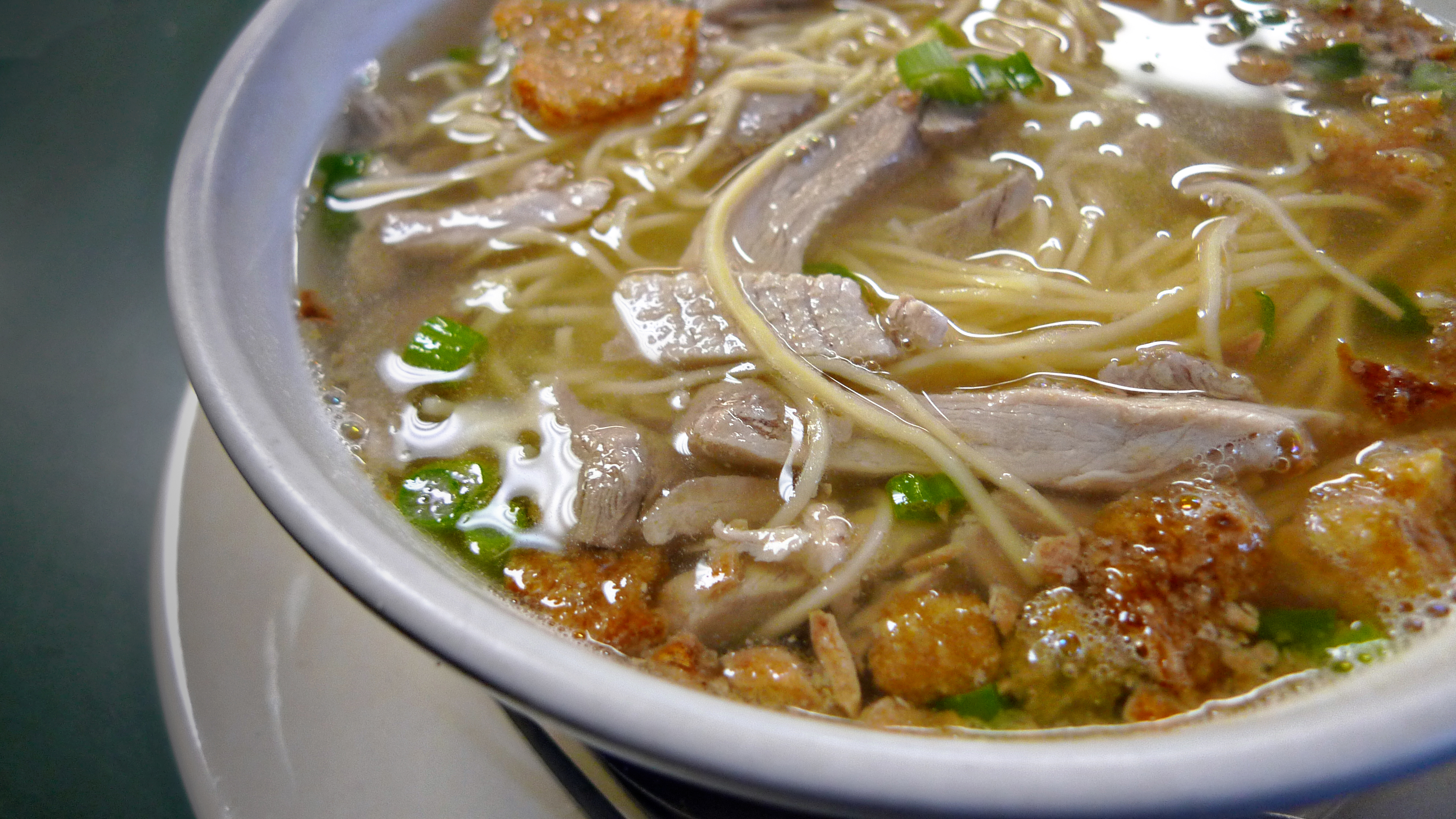
Batchoy

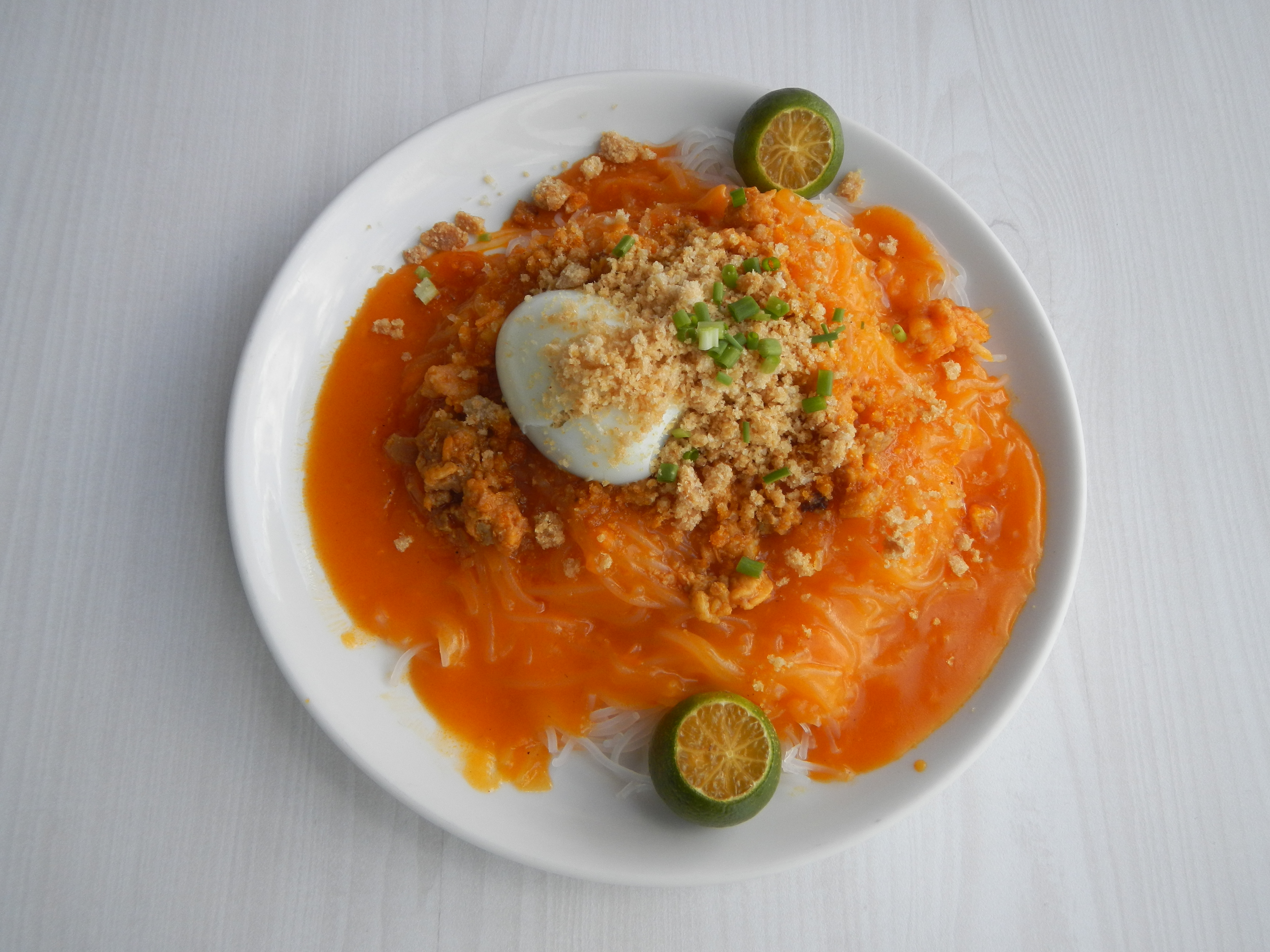
Pancit palabok with calamansi

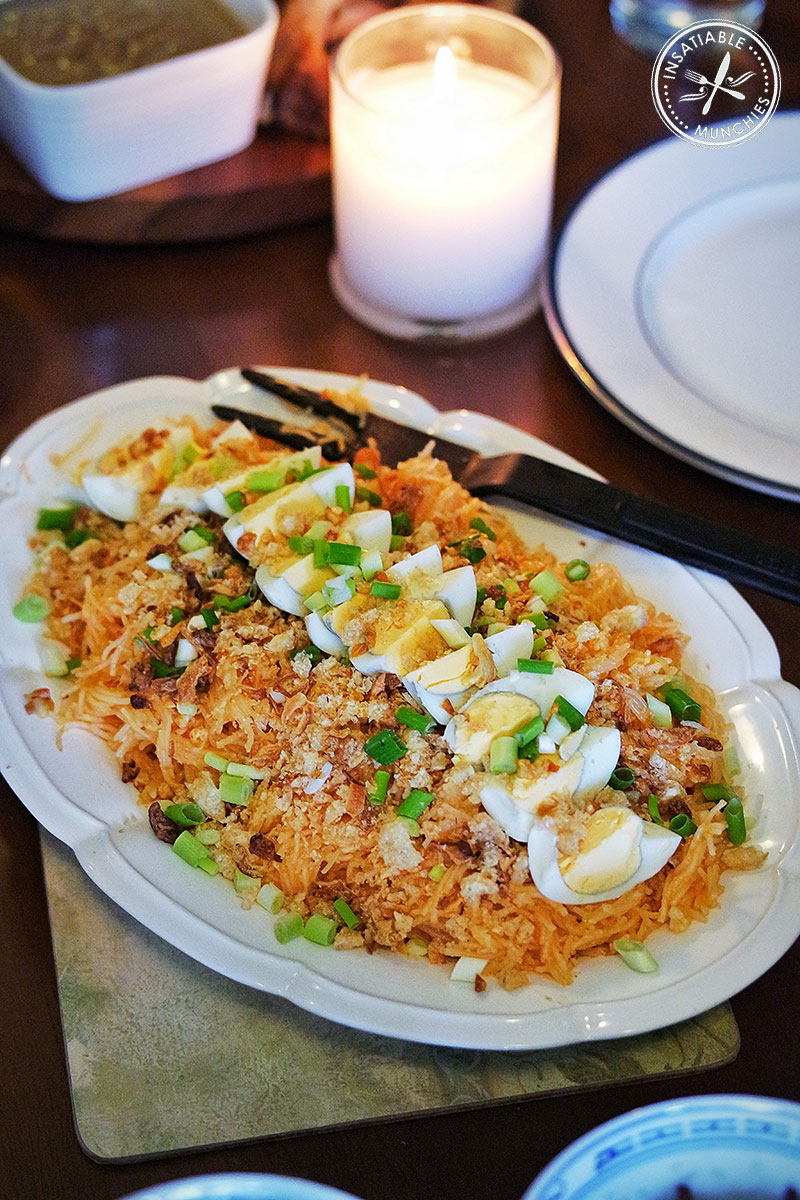
Pancit luglug

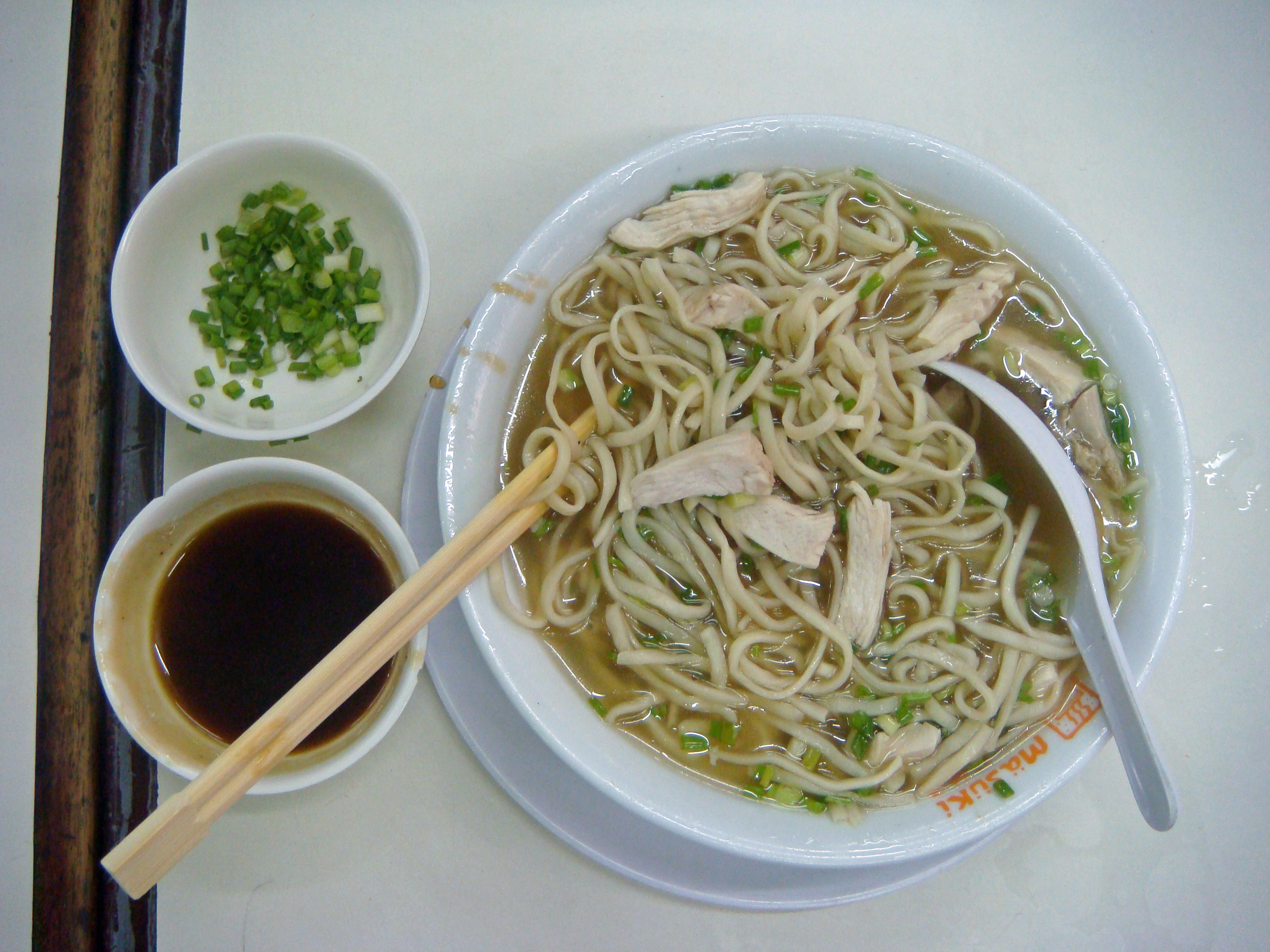
Pancit mami

- Batchoy – a noodle soup made with pork offal, crushed pork cracklings, chicken stock, beef loin and round noodles. Its origins can be traced to the district of La Paz, Iloilo City in the Philippines
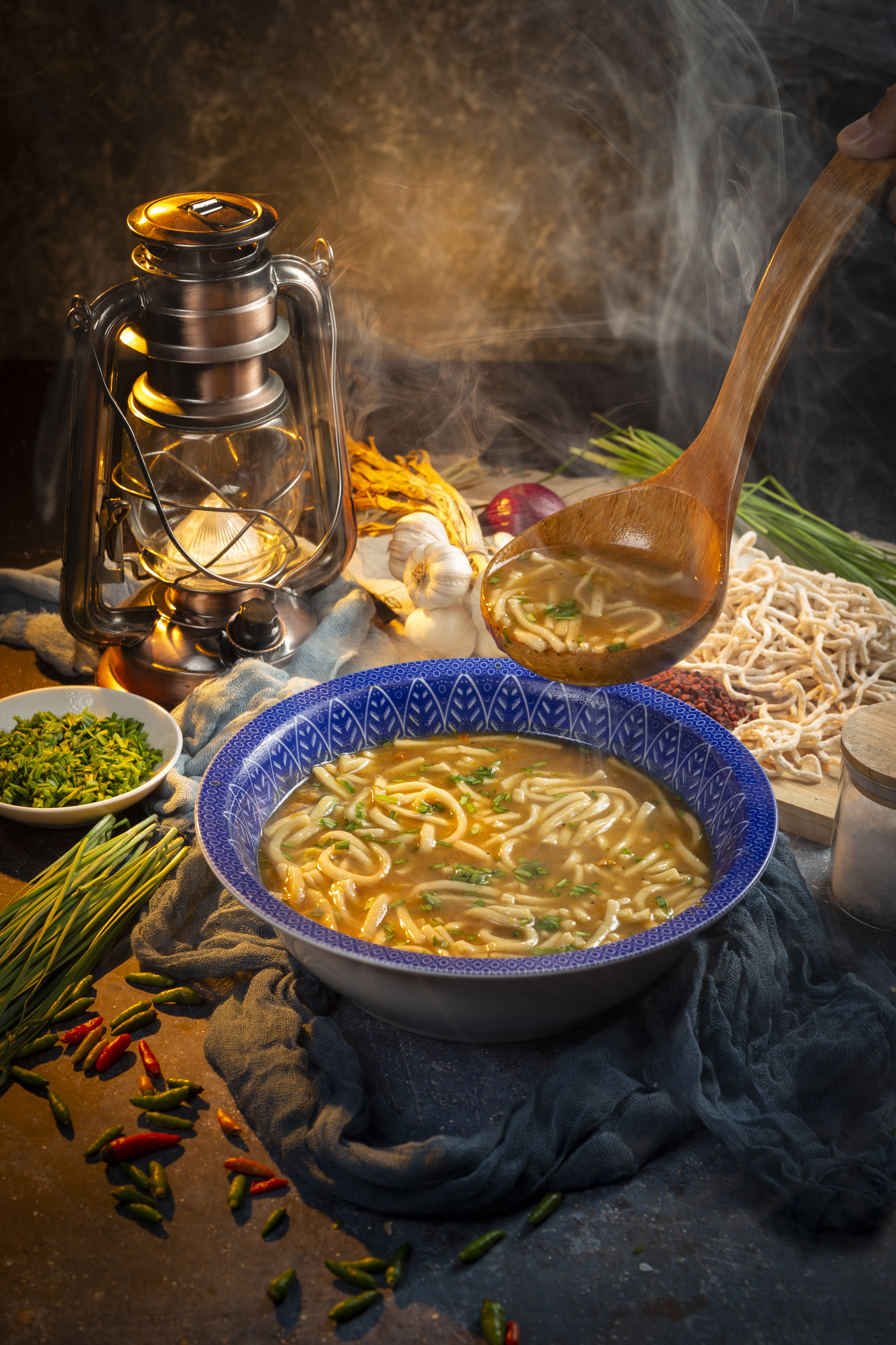
- Abra or Ilocos Miki
  Maki mi – thick pork tenderloin soup originating in the Chinese-Filipino community of Binondo, Manila.
- Miki Villasis – common in the eastern Pangasinan area. A variant of Pancit Miki, a soupy version partnered with puto or pan de cito. Some add pancit bihon as toppings.
- Pancit alanganin – originated from Bocaue, Bulacan. It is made similarly to pancit canton but has a soupy broth with added milk.
- Pancit Bam-i – also known as Pancit Bisaya. A specialty originating in Cebu, with a combination of bihon (vermicelli) and canton (egg) noodles sautéed together.
- Pancit batchoy – Iloilo's stir-fried version of batchoy.
- Pancit Bato – is local to the Bicol Region; especially the town of Bato in Camarines Sur. The noodles are slightly toasted while it's still dry.
- Pancit bihon guisado – or simply pancit bihon (traditionally and historically also spelled as Spanish: bijon) is the type usually associated with the word "pancit", very thin rice noodles (rice vermicelli) fried with soy sauce some citrus, possibly with patís, and some variation of sliced meat and chopped vegetables.
- Pancit Cabagan – served in Cabagan, Isabela and nearby towns. Stir-fried and served either dry with separate soup, or "wet" or soup and noodles combined.
- Pancit canton – Filipino adaptation of lo mein and chow mein. Either in instant or stir-fried versions. It is named after the type of noodle used.
- Pancit canton Ilonggo
- Pancit chami – from Lucena City, Quezon
- Pancit choca (or Pancit pusít) – a black pancit from Cavite made with squid ink and bihon.
- Pancit habhab – A Lucban, Quezon specialty. Served in banana leaves, eaten directly without utensils, the name is an onomatopoeia of eating it, like a pig snorts.
- Hi-bol – A noodle soup dish originating from the Ilocos Region that is similar to a mami, but the distinguishing specialty ingredient is tripe from livestock. The name reportedly comes from "high voltage".
- Pancit kinalas – Naga City, Camarines Sur's version of pancit, in soup or dried form. It consists of noodles garnished by scraped meat from pork or beef's head and other parts, enhanced with a thick deep-brown sauce coming from the brains of a cow or pig. The dish is further flavored with spices (sili and pepper) and served in hot broth. Boiled egg added is optional.
- Pancit lanu – Found only along San Vicente Street in San Pedro, Laguna
- Pancit lomi – Originally from Batangas, pancit lomi is usually sold in eateries across the province. With the mobility of the Filipinos; however, other people got wind of pancit lomi and now different lomihán (eateries serving lomi), panciterias, and carinderias (eateries serving a wider variety of viands with rice) offer it.
- Pancit luglúg or Luglóg – a Kapampangan version of pancit palabok that is essentially the same dish. The only difference is that it uses thicker cornstarch noodles. The name comes from its traditional method of cooking, which uses a bamboo skimmer to submerge the noodles briefly in boiling water.
- Pancit lusay – an Ilocano stir-fried noodle dish made with miki or lusay noodles, flavored with bugguong (fermented fish paste) or bagoong na isda, and typically paired with Laoag or Vigan longganisa. It also includes other ingredients such as garlic, onion, tomatoes, and bell peppers.
- Pancit Malabon – Thick rice noodles with different toppings that originated in Malabon. Early versions of this dish uses bamboo shoots.
- Pancit mami – round egg noodle soup
- Pancit mayaman – found in Guinayangan, Quezon
- Pancit miki – round egg noodles, or flat yellow noodles, or dusty white noodles either stir-fried or in soupy version.
- Pancit míki-bíhon guisado – round egg noodles with bihon, a hybrid type of stir-fried noodle.
- Pancit odong or Odong – Japanese-Visayan noodle dish from Mindanao and the Visayas that uses yellow round flour noodles called odong, canned sardines in tomato sauce, and vegetables (usually bottle gourd or patola).
- Pancit Olongapo – pancit miki prepared with sarsa (sauce) made of thickened chicken and pork broth, darkened with a little soy sauce.
- Pancit moròng
- Pancit palabok – uses thinner cornstarch noodles (sometimes substituted with bihon). It is topped with a shrimp-based sauce dyed bright orange with annatto seeds, shrimp, crushed or ground chicharrón, tinapa (smoked fish) flakes, hard-boiled eggs, and green onions.
- Pancit pula – a variation of pancit miki from Batangas City
- Pancit sotanghon – a cellophane noodle soup with a chicken broth base. It may include some kind of meat and vegetable. A typical sotanghon is made with calamansi, sliced straw mushrooms, slivered dark-meat chicken and green onion.
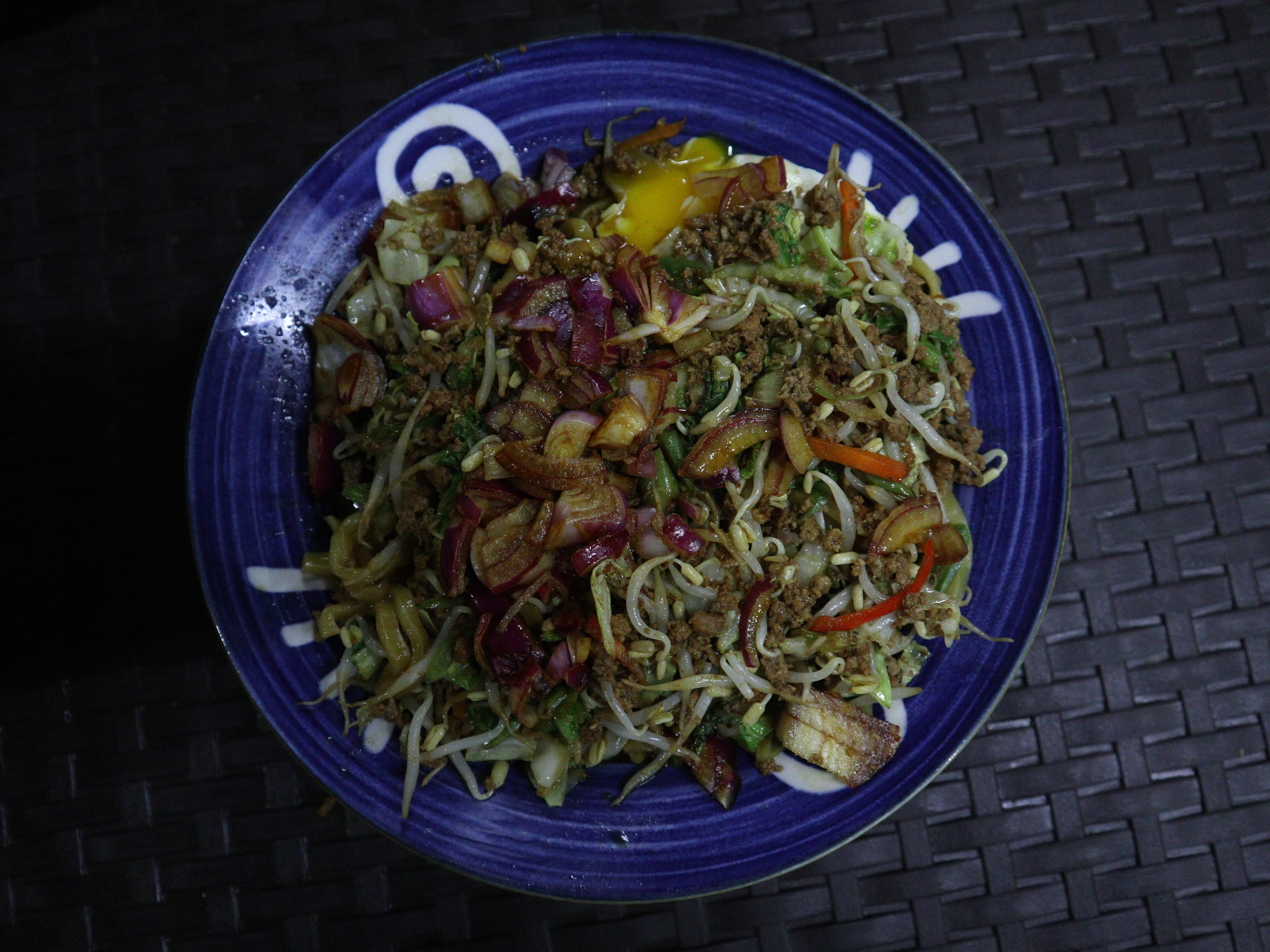
- Pancit Batil Patong
  Pansit sabaw – Pansit miki with soup
- Pansit Tuguegarao or Batil Patong – not commonly known outside of Tuguegarao in the province of Cagayan in Northern Luzon, Philippines. It is an unusual noodle dish with a sauce based on soy and "cara-beef" beef broth. It is served with two piquant side dishes: a cup of egg-drop soup made with the same cara-beef broth; and a dish of chopped onions, vinegar, or calamansi, chili peppers and soy sauce. The noodles are usually wheat-based and are topped with ground cara-beef, pork liver, mung bean sprouts, and poached egg from whence the name batil patong, literally "scrambled and placed on top" is thought to be derived. Sometimes, other vegetables, crushed pork-rind cracklings or chorizo are also added on top. The soup was served separately.
- Pansit sinanta – also from Tuguegarao, consists of flat egg noodles, bihon, clams and chicken, with broth colored with annatto and served with pinakufu, a chewy rice cake.
- Pansit langlang – a historical noodle dish from Cavite which is said to be the favorite of José Rizal, to the point he mentioned the dish in his novel El Filibusterismo.

=== Non-noodle pancit ===
Other variants of pancit do not usually use noodles. They include:

- Pancit buko – uniquely uses long coconut strips, instead of noodles.
- Pancit estacion – from Tanza, Cavite, uses mung bean sprouts instead of noodles.
- Pancit kilawin – a variety of pancit which originated in Rosario, Cavite. In lieu of rice or wheat noodles, shredded unripe papaya fruit is used cooked with vinegar and fish. Usually partnered with dinuguan, a dish made of pig's blood.
- Pancit labong – an early version of pancit Malabon that uses julienned bamboo shoots instead of noodles.
- Pancit lukot – noodle-like egg strands (lukot or lokot) of the sea hare Dolabella auricularia (locally known as donsul) sauteed and cooked similar to pancit guisado
- Pancit Molo – wonton soup with wonton wrappers added to the broth, serving as its "noodles".
- Pancit papaya – uses julienned young papaya strips, instead of noodles.
- Pancit ng bukid – the young tender runners (known as takway, daludal, sagibsib, among other names) of taro, swamp taro, and other related plants. It is peeled before cooking and resembles noodles, hence the name pancit ng bukid (literally "pancit of the countryside").
- Seaweed pancit – a noodle variant from Tiwi, Albay which uses seaweed. It is rich in calcium and magnesium and the seaweed noodles can be cooked into pancit canton, pancit luglug, spaghetti, or carbonara.
Gallery of pancit variants

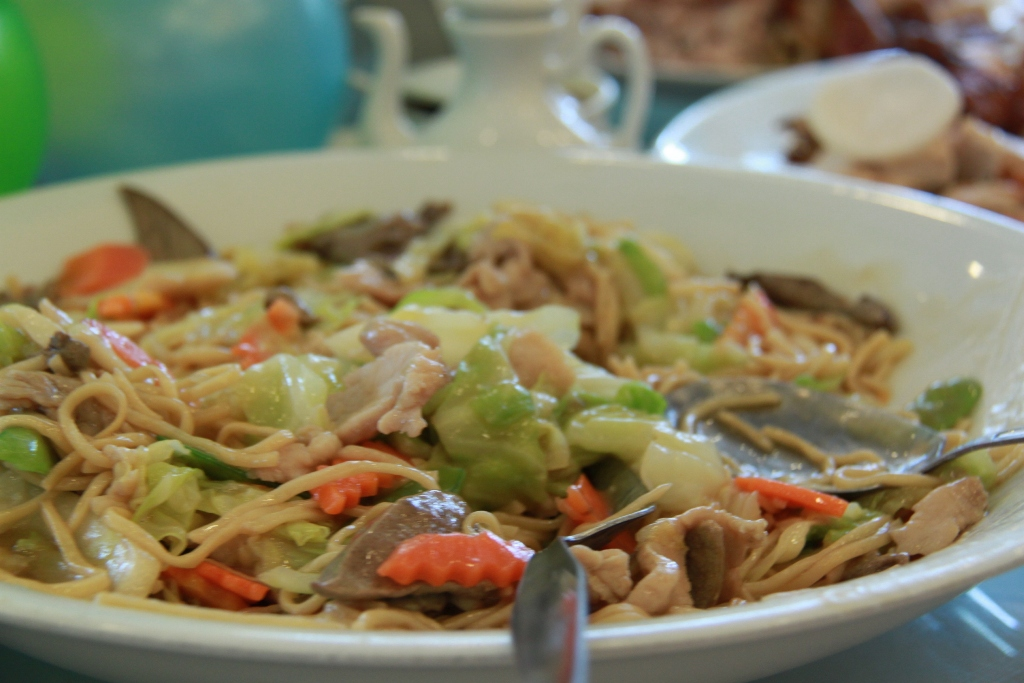
"Saucy" pancit canton, a common braised version

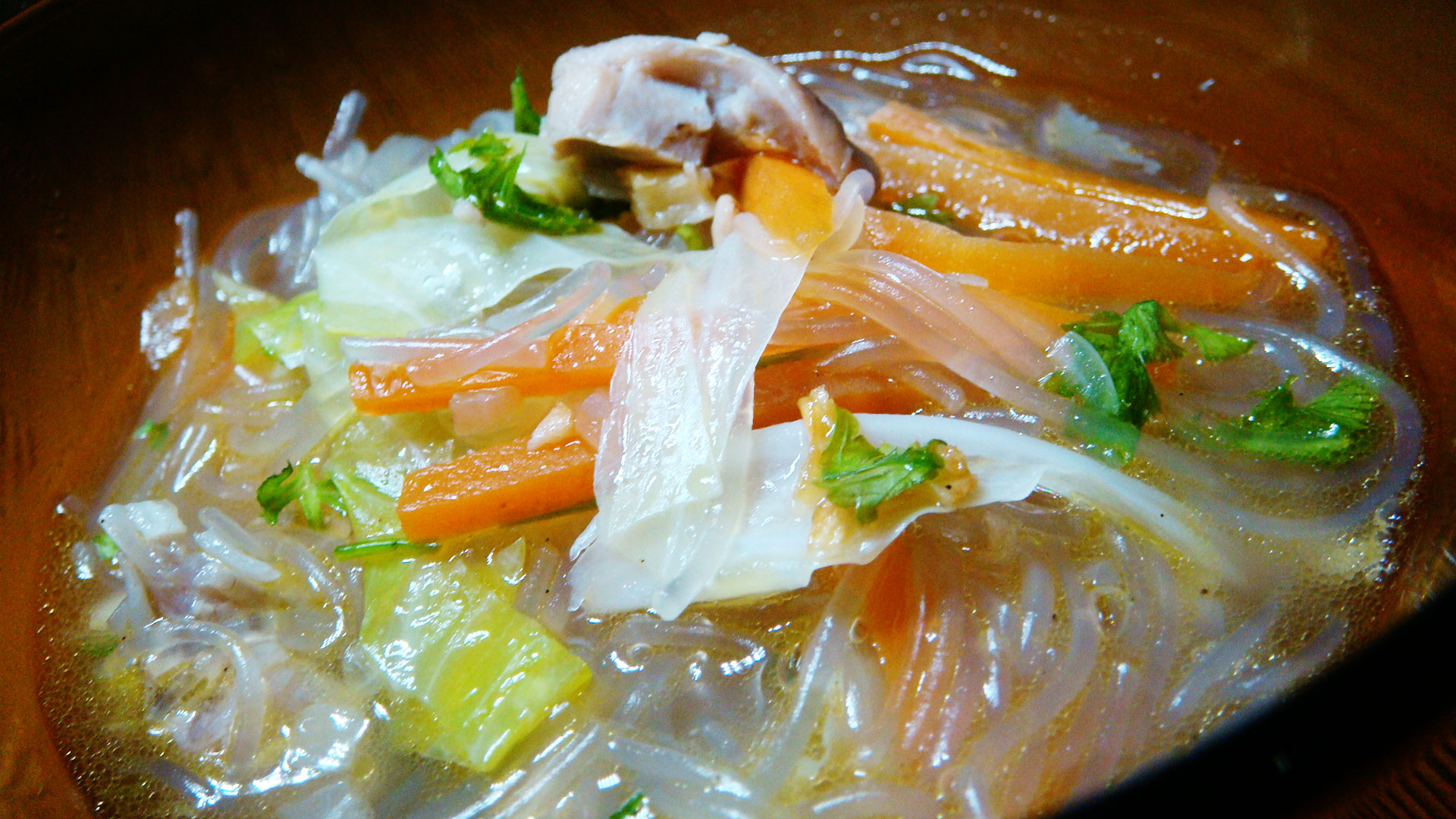
Chicken sotanghon soup

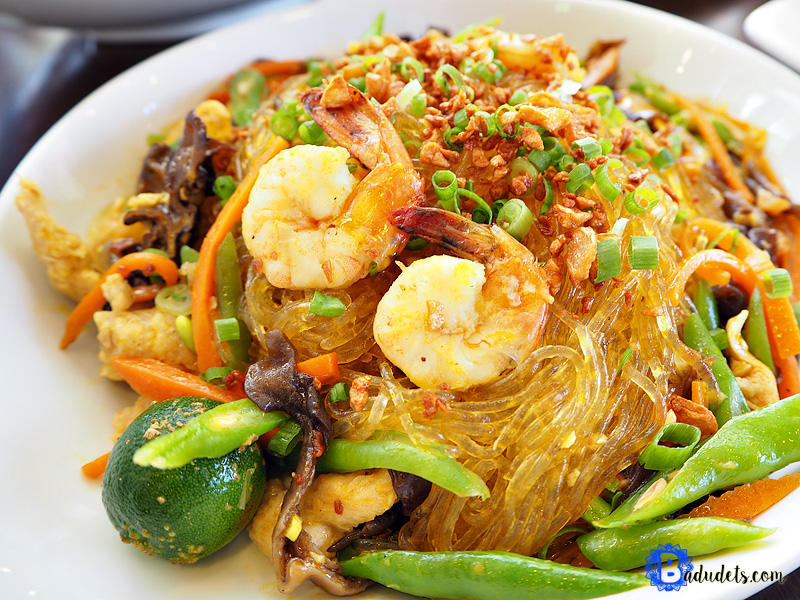
Sotanghon guisado with calamansi

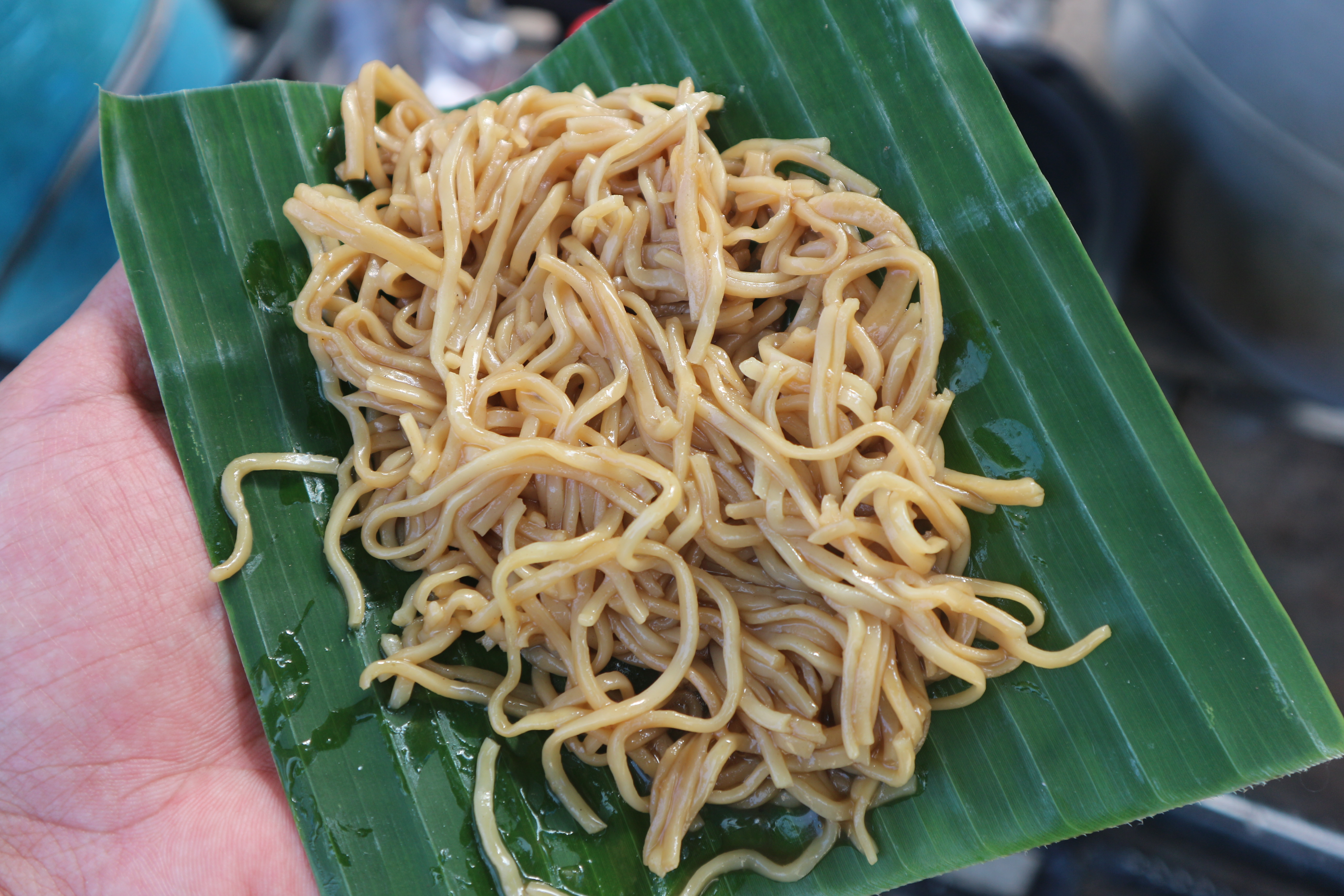
Pancit habhab

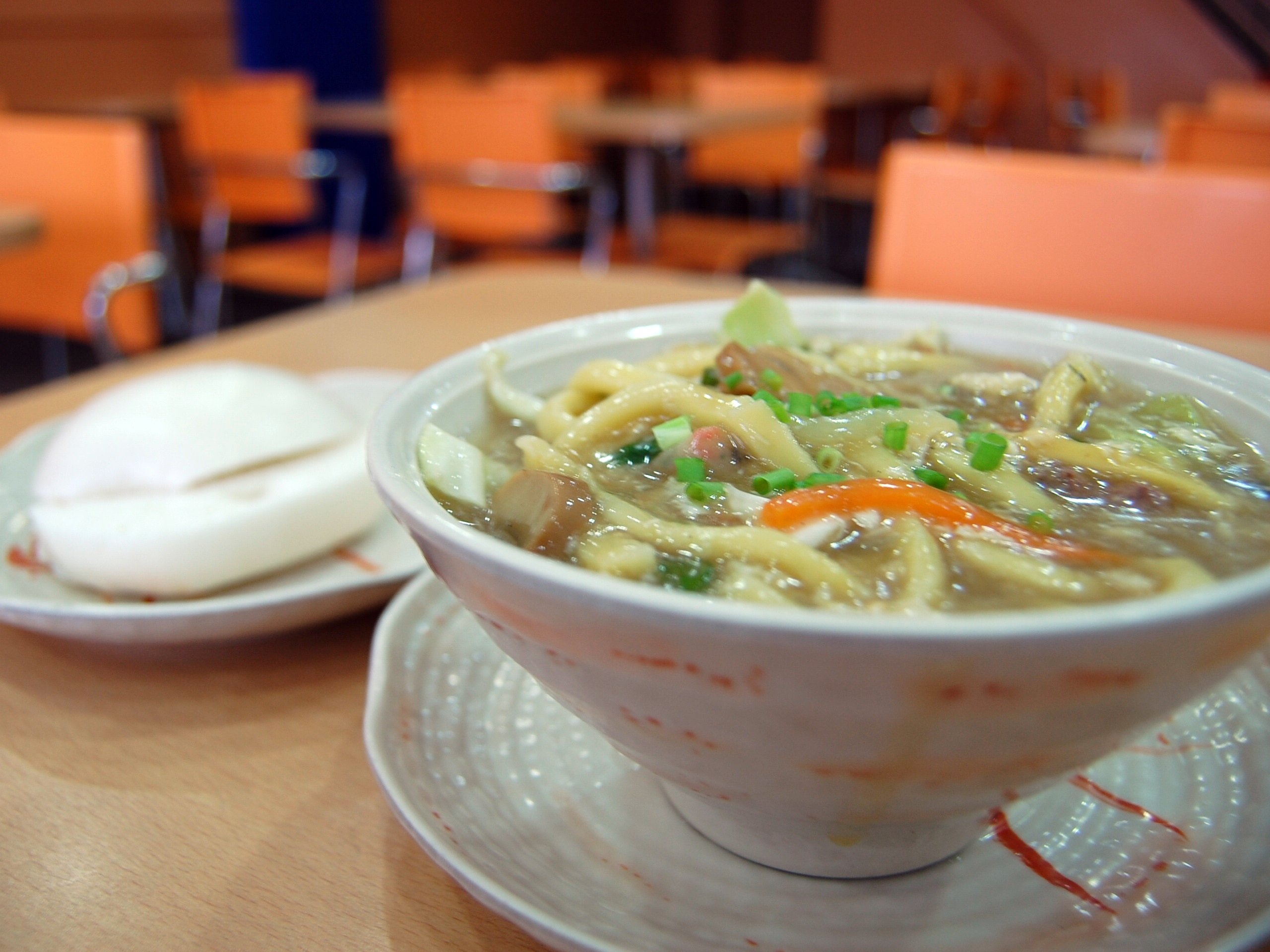
Pancit lomi

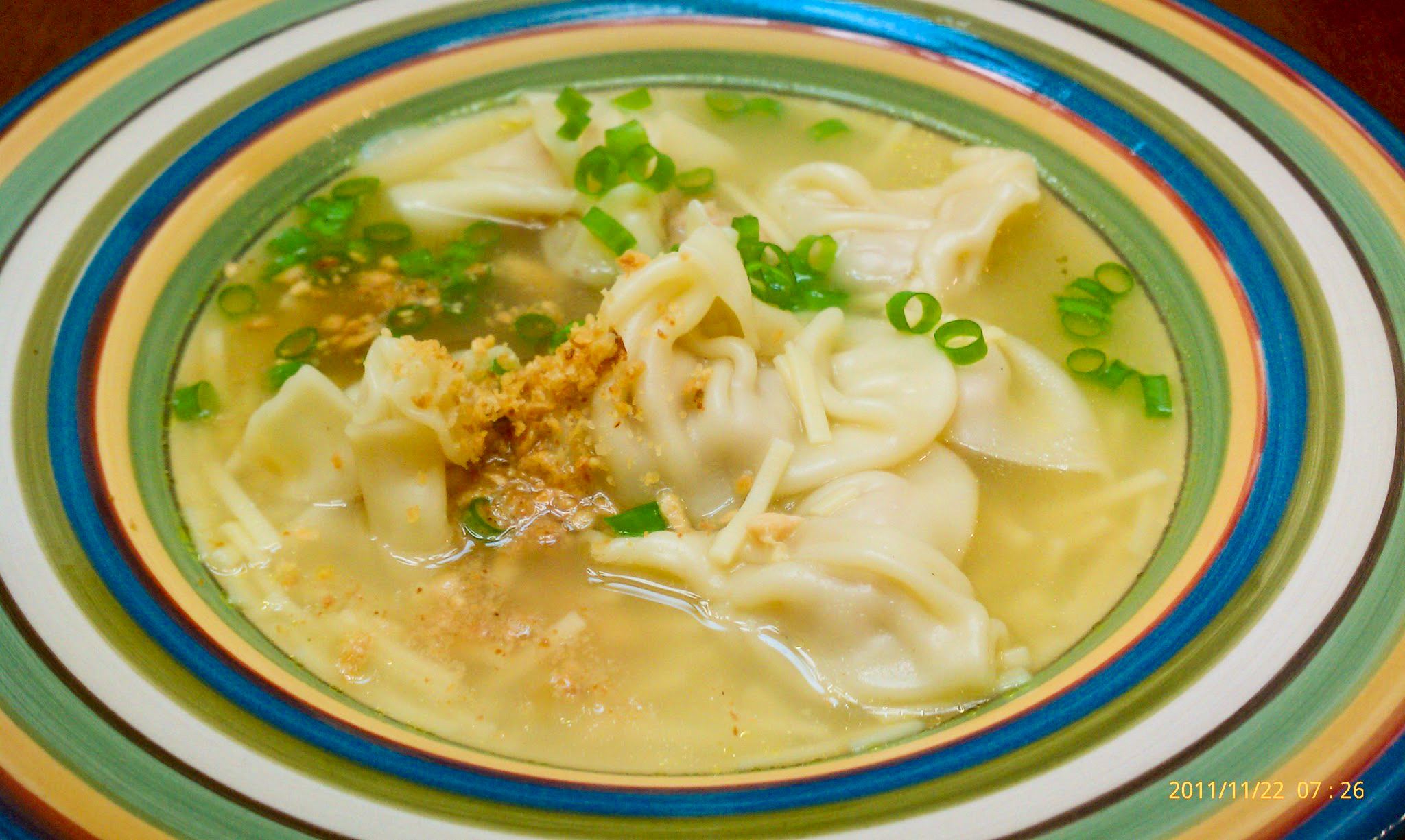
Pancit Molo, which uses wontons instead of noodles

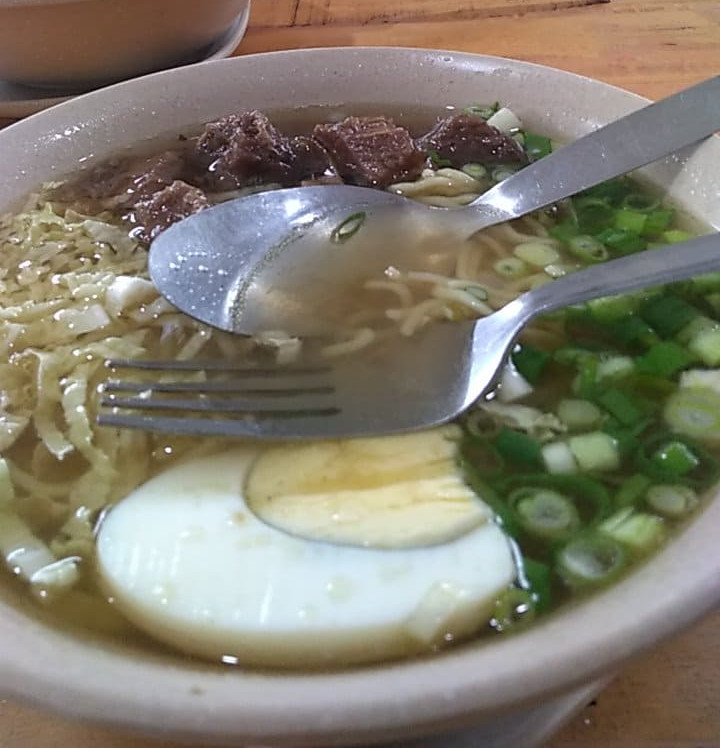
Beef pares mami

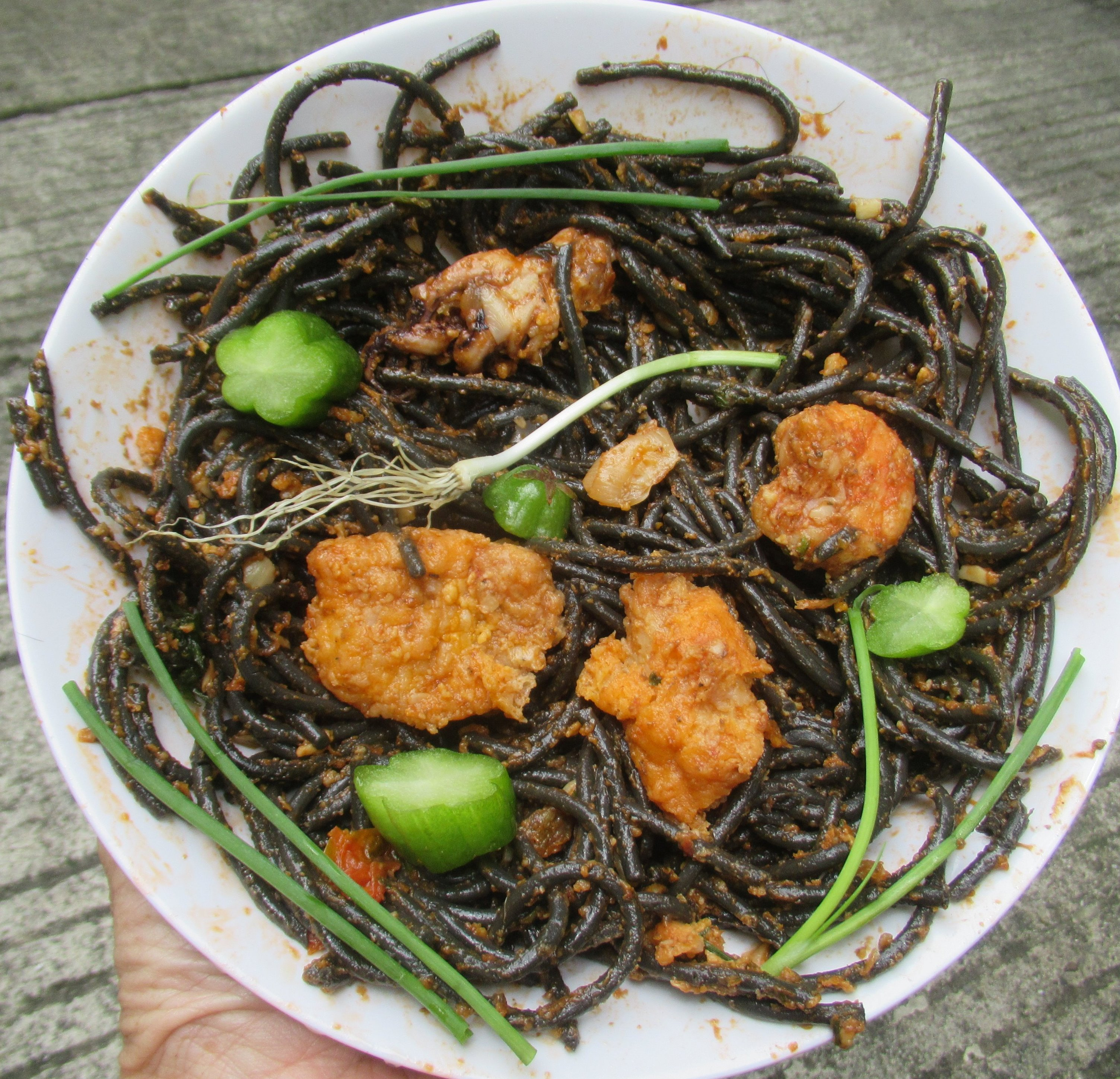
Pancit choca

Pancit puti with toasted garlic is a mainstay of festivals.

== Instant pancit ==
Commercial instant noodle versions of pancit are also available, and are popular due to their affordability. The most common flavors are mami and pancit canton, but other Filipino-style noodles are also being adapted for the Philippine market.

== See also ==
- Filipino cuisine
  - Filipino Chinese cuisine
- List of noodles
  - List of noodle dishes
  - Noodle soups
