= Pancit choca =

Filipino black seafood noodle dish

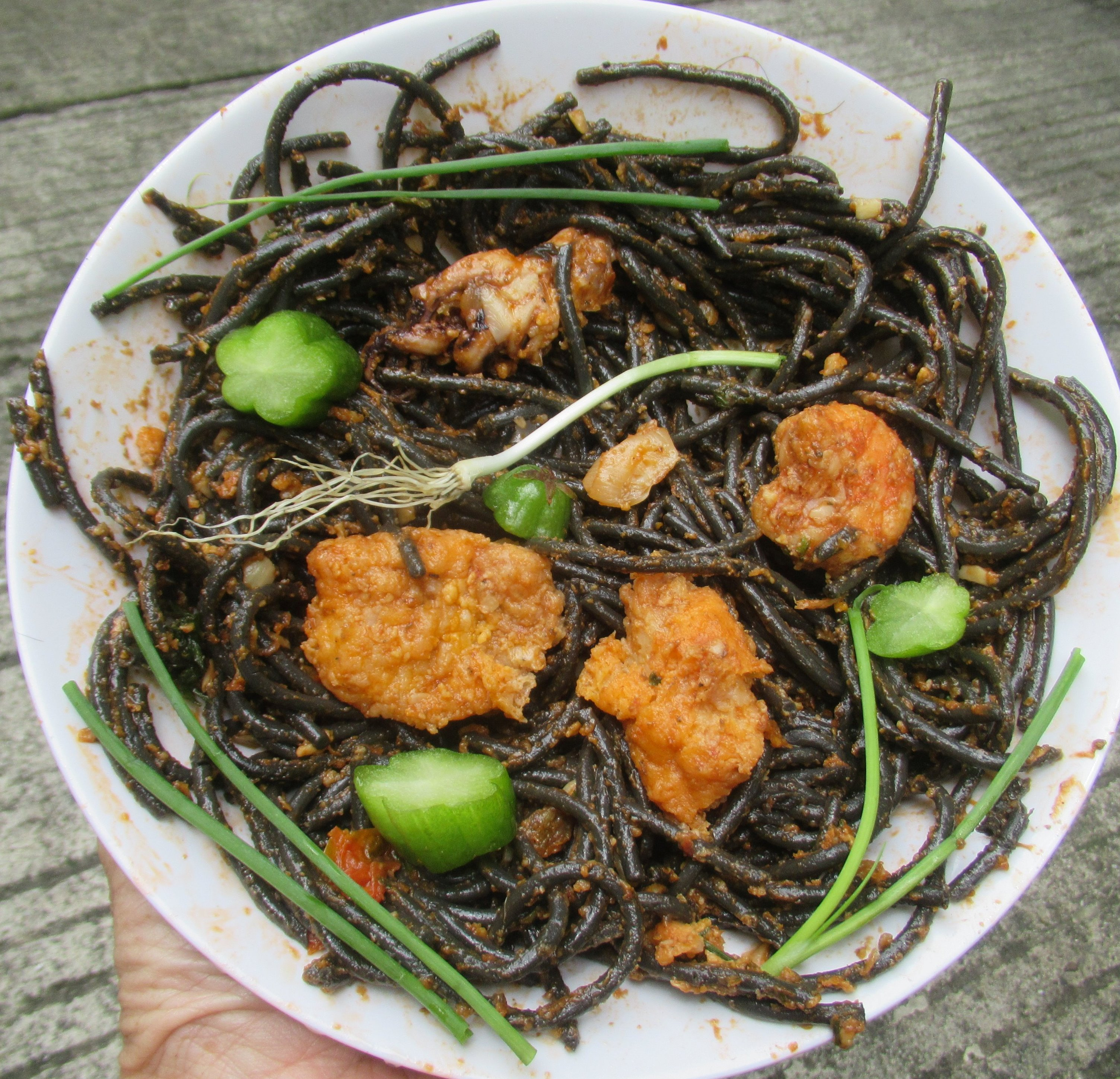
- Alternative names: pancit choca en su tinta, pancit de choca, pancit choco, pancit pusit, pancit negra, pancit itim, fideos negros, pancit bihon à la negra
- Course: Main dish
- Place of origin: Philippines
- Region or state: Cavite
- Serving temperature: Hot
- Main ingredients: squid ink, cuttlefish or squid, rice vermicelli, kamias
- Similar dishes: paella negra, pancit bihon

Pancit choca is a Filipino black seafood noodle dish made with cuttlefish, squid ink, and bihon (rice vermicelli). It originates from Cavite, Philippines, and is originally known as pancit choca en su tinta in Caviteño Chavacano. It is also known more commonly as pancit pusít in Filipino. It is a type of pancit.

== Names ==
In Caviteño Chavacano, the dish is known as pancit choca (or choco) en su tinta, literally "noodle with cuttlefish in its own ink", commonly shortened to pancit choca or pancit choco. Choca or choco (sometimes spelled choka or choko) means "cuttlefish" in Chavacano.

Pancit choca is also known as pancit pusít ("squid pancit"); as well as pancit itím, pancit negra, pancit estación negra, pancit bihon à la negra, fideos negros, and "black pancit" among other names, chiefly referencing its color.

== Description ==
The dish is common in Tanza, Cavite City and Trece Mártires. The dish originally uses cuttlefish, but squid is also frequently used as a substitute. Its black color led to its initial consumption only during Lent or funerals.

Pancit choca is initially cooked similarly to adobong pusit. First, the ink sacs (lumot) are removed from the cuttlefish or squid without puncturing these and set aside. The cuttlefish is cleaned and diced into rings and sautéed along with garlic, onion, bay leaves, and (optional) labuyo chili. Vinegar, soy sauce, a bit of water, and the ink is then added and brought to a boil. Additional spices may be added to taste, like patís (fish sauce) and salt. The bihon (rice vermicelli) is added last with reduced heat until it is soft but still al dente. Some versions soften the bihon in hot water and mix it at the very end of cooking.

It is traditionally garnished with thinly sliced kamiás (bilimbi), fried garlic, crushed chicharrón, scallions, and/or kinchay (Chinese celery). It is served with calamansî and labuyo chili (if not already added). Dayap (key lime, C. aurantifolia) or biasong (small-flowered papeda, C. hystrix var. micrantha) may also be used instead of calamansî.

Some variants of the dish use sotanghón (glass noodles) instead of bihon. Others also add mussels or shrimp, and/or cook the dish in shrimp stock instead of water.

== See also ==
- Pancit estacion
- Pancit Molo
- Pancit palabok
- Calamares
- Fideuà
- List of seafood dishes
