= Pancit estacion =

Filipino noodle dish

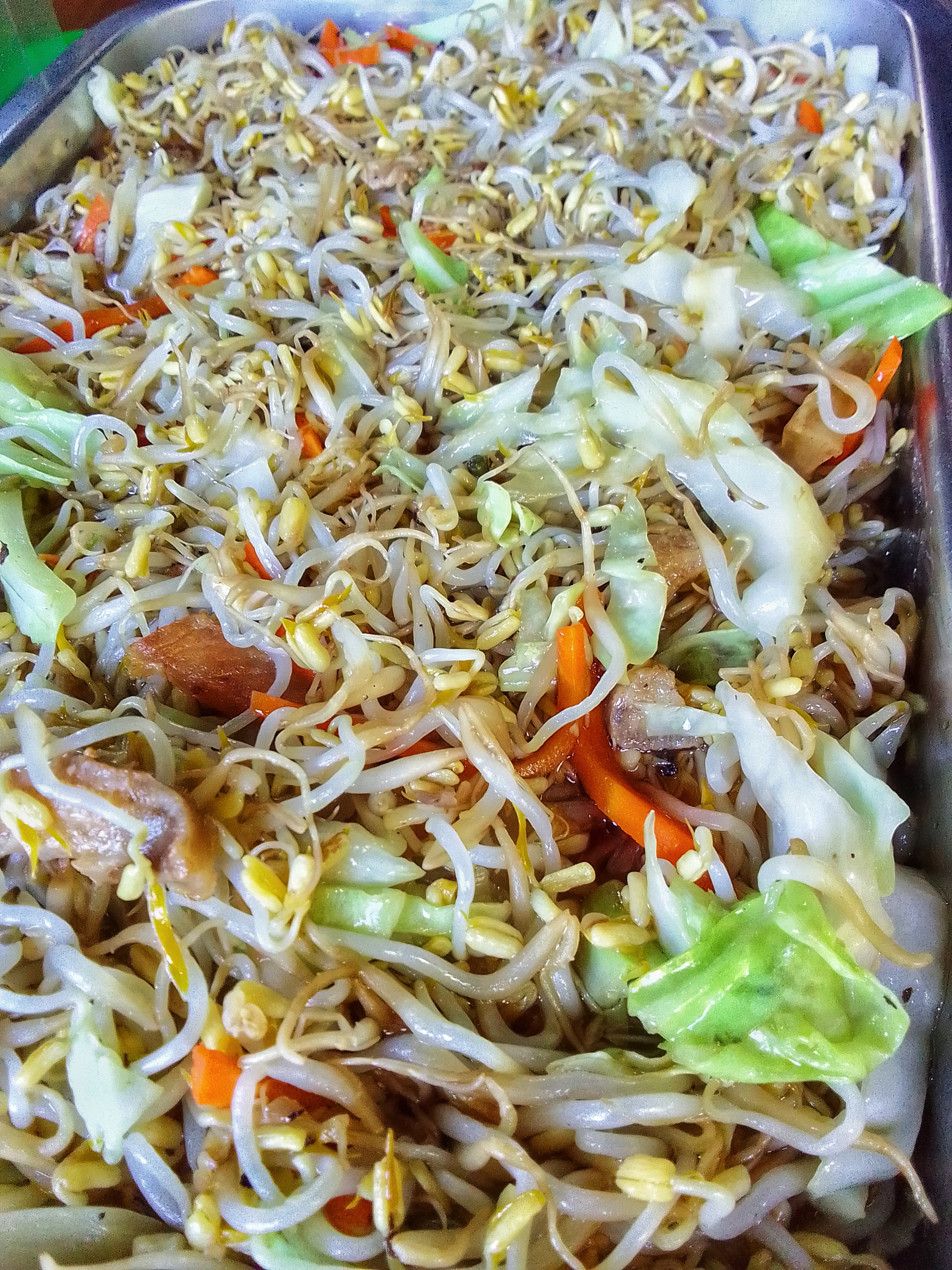
- Type: Pancit
- Place of origin: Philippines
- Region or state: Cavite
- Main ingredients: Mung bean sprouts, sauce (atsuete, tinapa, kamias)

Pancit Estacion is a type of pancit, or stir-fried rice noodle dish, which originated in Tanza, Cavite, Philippines. Its main ingredient is mung bean sprouts (used as a substitute for rice noodles). Its sauce includes corn starch, atsuete, tinapa and kamias.

Nana Heleng’s iconic Filipino cuisine is the pancit twist which uses mung bean sprouts replacing the classic noodles in Barangay Biwas, Tanza, Cavite. Pera Paraan revealed that Pancit Estacion owner Johnny Bobadilla, son of Nana Heleng, discovered the unique ingredient from Navotas and Malabon. In 1934, due to noodle shortage, his grandmother used togue instead and started selling along the vicinity of the old PNR Tanza station. It still stands at 257 Tramo, Tanza, part of the defunct Naic line. It is paired with Pan de Rasyon (Monay) and Quesilyo (Kesong puti).

== Pancit estacion negra ==
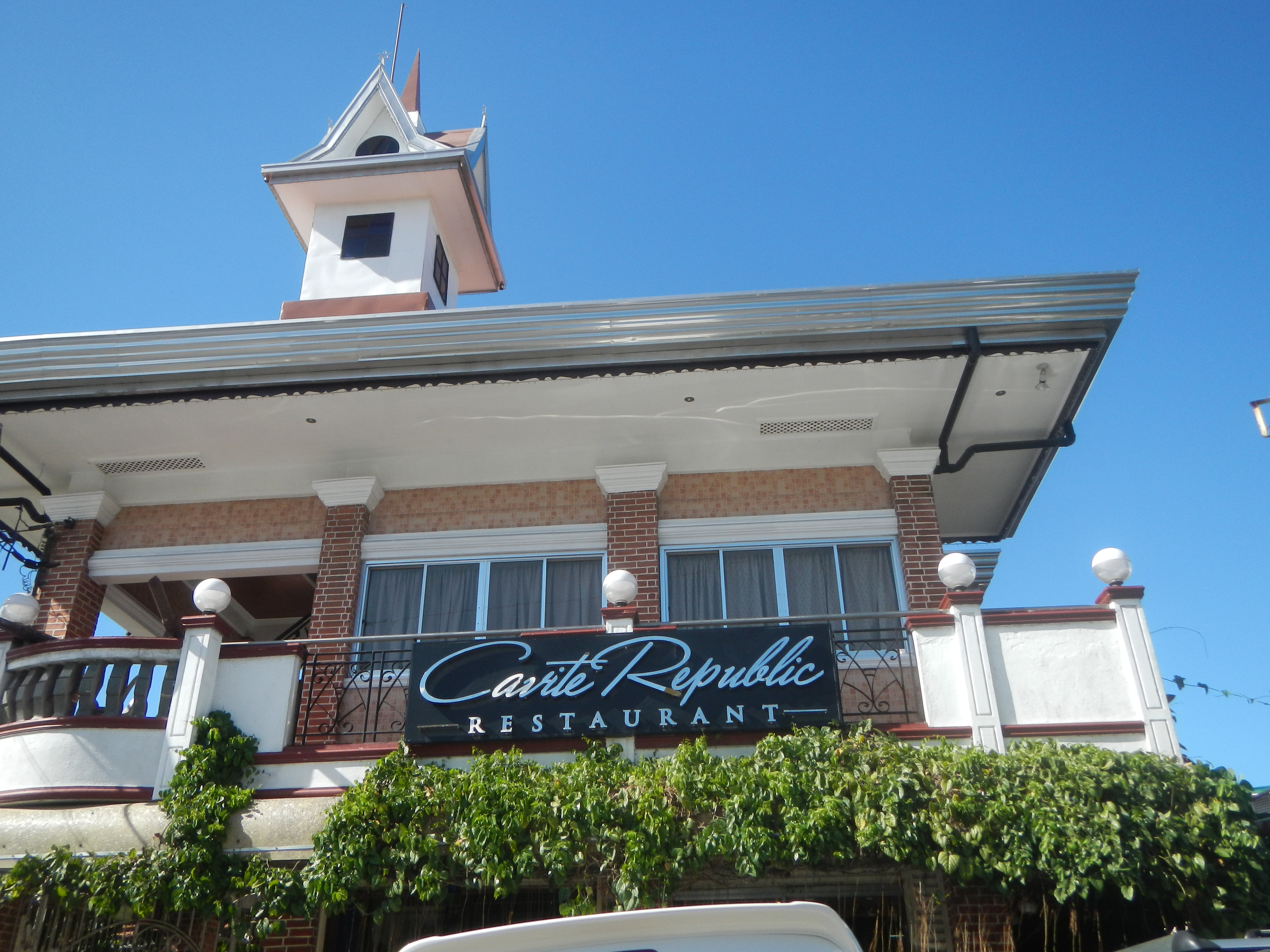
Cavite Republic Restaurant, Trece Martires

The aesthetic significance of Luzon pancit is visible in the use of cephalopod ink or squid ink of Caviteños from Tanza, Cavite City and Trece Martirez. Their artistic or culinary brilliance is demonstrated by tinting black their Pancit Estacion Negra creating a unique appearance vis-à-vis the classic noodles.

The iconic dish is mainly sourced from cuttlefish. Because of its black color, it was originally eaten only during Lent or funerals. It is topped with contrasting green color of Kamias and the orange color of the fried garlic.

Pinas Sarap found that this Caviteño seafood pasta turns black by mixing flour, eggs, salt, and squid ink. The dough is kneaded and air-dried. It is a delicacy in Cavite Republic Restaurant at San Agustin Poblacion, Trece Martires City. The heritage resto was founded in 2002 by Andrew R. Pacumio, a “patriot of Cavite cuisine, history, and culture,” and Matt Pacumio. The black pasta uses homemade flat pasta, and crispy dinuguan. It is usually served with sauce made with corn starch, atsuete, tinapa and kamias.

== See also ==
- Pancit choca
