= Odong =

Filipino noodle dish

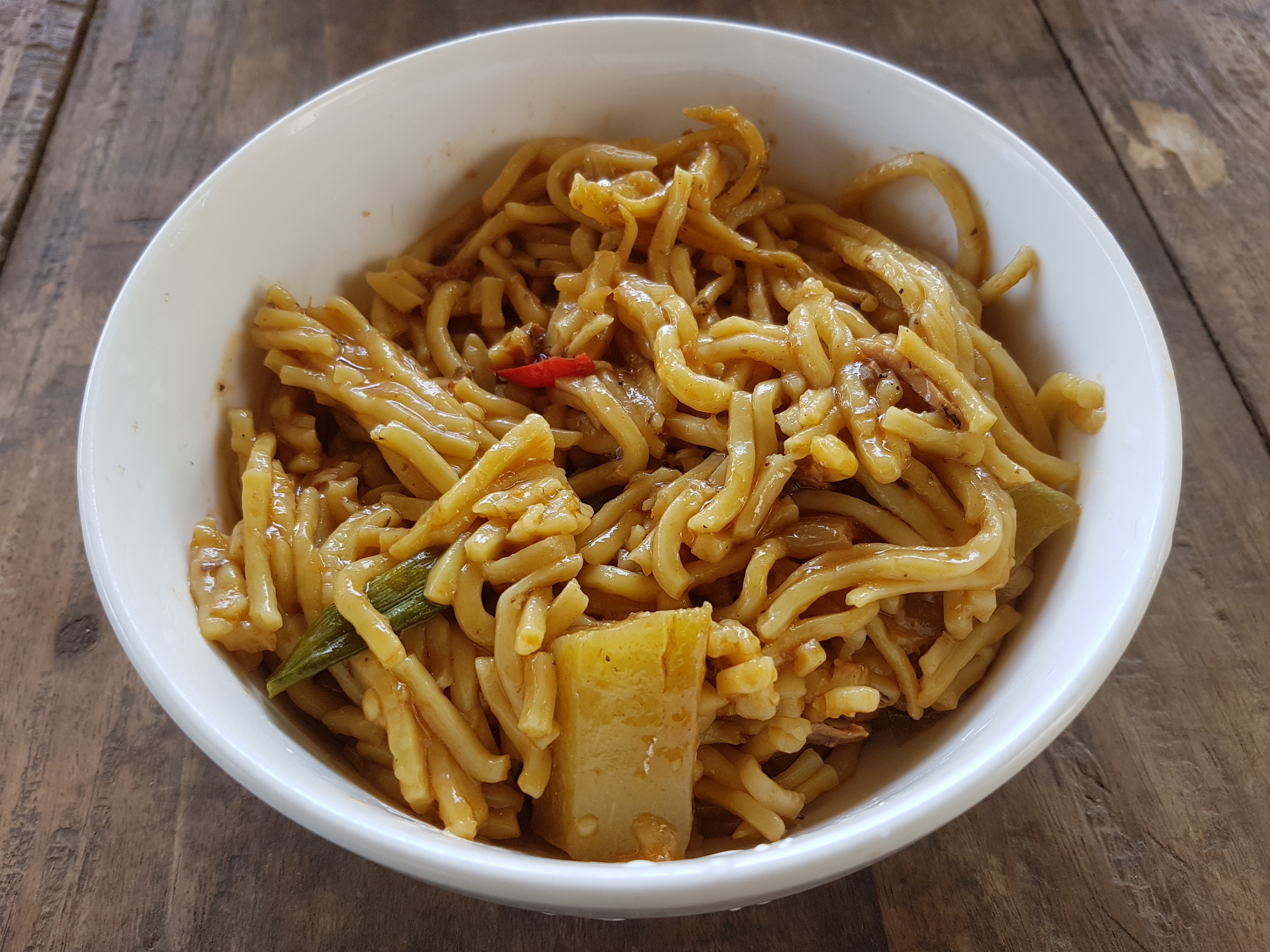
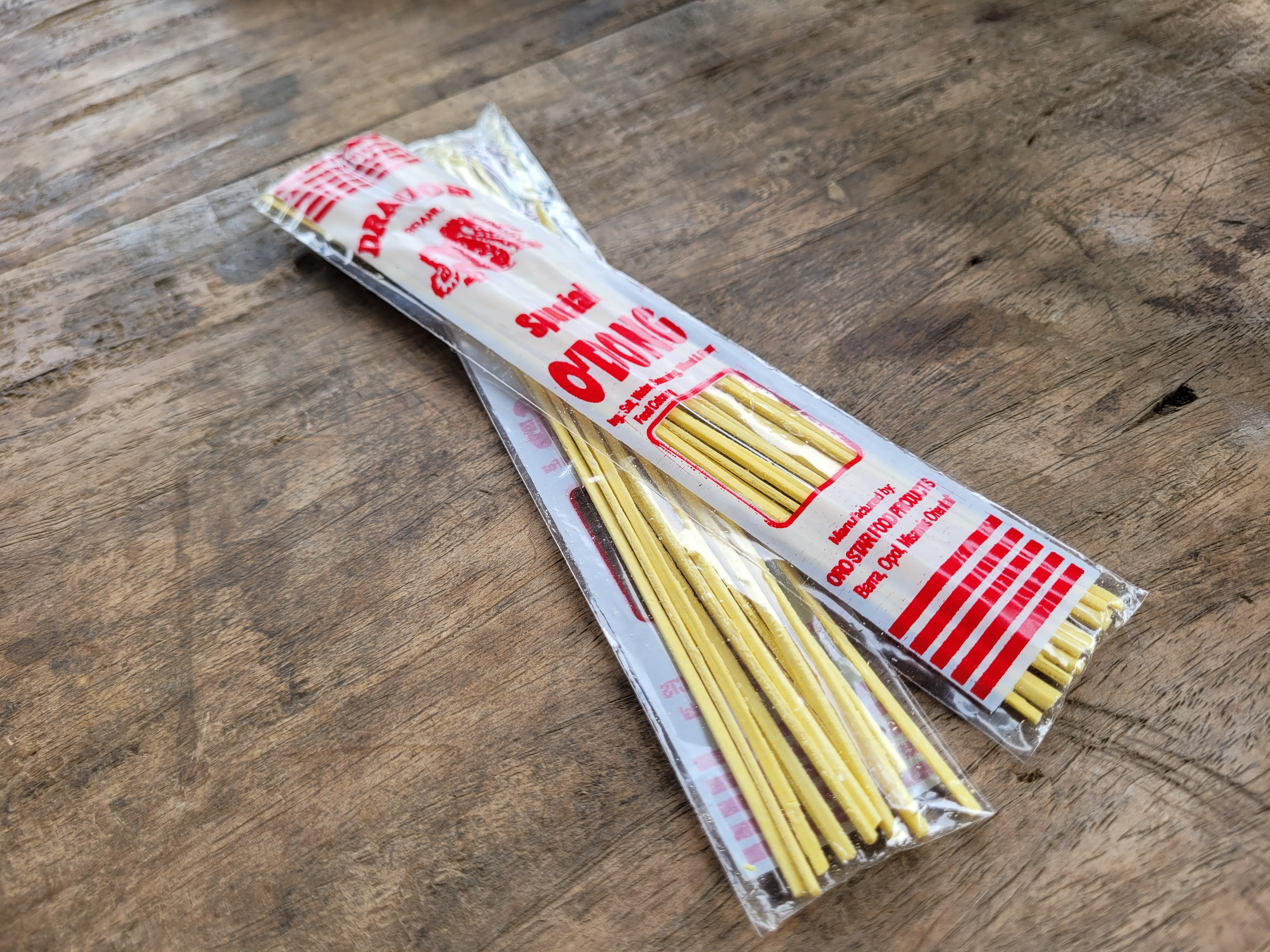
- Top: Odong guisado Bottom: Uncooked odong noodles
- Alternative names: Pancit odong, Udong, Pancit udong
- Place of origin: Philippines
- Region or state: Davao Region, Visayas
- Serving temperature: Hot
- Main ingredients: Flour noodles, canned sardines with tomato sauce, bottle gourd, loofah, other vegetables
- Variations: Odong guisado

Odong, also called pancit odong, is a Visayan noodle soup made with odong noodles, canned smoked sardines (tinapa) in tomato sauce, bottle gourd (upo), loofah (patola), chayote, ginger, garlic, red onions, and various other vegetables. It is garnished and spiced with black pepper, scallions, toasted garlic, calamansi, or labuyo chilis. The dish is usually prepared as a soup, but it can also be cooked with minimal water, in which case, it is known as odong guisado.

It is a common simple and cheap meal in Mindanao (particularly the Davao Region) and the Visayas Islands. It is almost always eaten with white rice, rarely on its own.

It is named after the round flour noodles called odong which are closest in texture and taste to the Okinawa soba. These noodles are characteristically sold dried into straight sticks around 6 to 8 in (15 to 20 cm) long. The name is derived from the Japanese udon noodles, although it does not use udon noodles or bear any resemblance to udon dishes. It originates from the Davao Region of Mindanao which had a large Japanese migrant community in the early 1900s. The odong noodles were previously locally manufactured by Okinawans, but modern odong noodles (which are distinctly yellowish) are imported from China or locally manufactured by Filipino-Chinese noodle makers. Because odong noodles are difficult to find in other regions, they can be substituted with other types of noodles; including misua, miki (egg noodles), udon, and even instant noodles.

== See also ==
- Pancit Molo
- La Paz Batchoy
- Ginataan
- List of soups
