= Pancit Malabon =

Filipino noodle dish

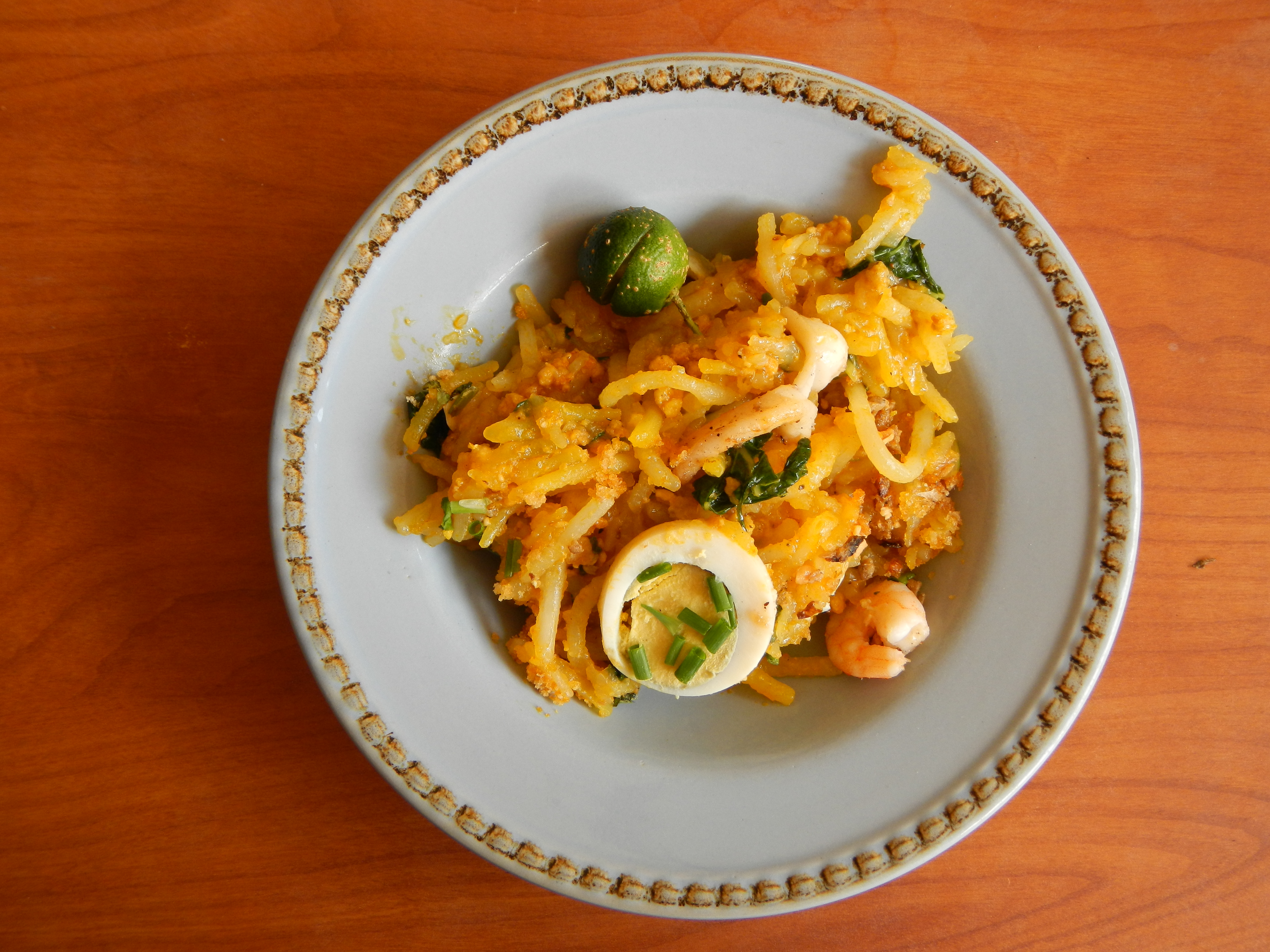
- Pancit Malabon (pancit Luglug, pancit Palabok), La Familia, Baliuag, Bulacan
- Type: Noodle
- Place of origin: Philippines
- Region or state: Malabon, Metro Manila
- Variations: Sauce (achuete, annatto, shrimp, patis–fish sauce, crab fat)
- Other information: Pancit luglug, pancit palabok

Pancit Malabon is a Filipino dish that is a type of pancit which originates from Malabon, Metro Manila, Philippines. It uses thick rice noodles. Its sauce has a yellow-orange hue, attributable to achuete (annatto seeds), shrimp broth, and flavor seasoned with patis (fish sauce for a complex umami flavor) and taba ng talangka (crab fat). Local fresh seafood toppings may include cooked shrimp, squid, smoked bangus (milkfish), mussels, and/or oysters. Other optional garnishes can include pork, hard-boiled duck or hen eggs, crushed chicharrón (pork rinds), chopped green onions, lightly browned sautéed minced garlic, and a spritz of calamansi juice.

It is very similar to pancit palabok, differing in the use of thicker noodles, the use of taba ng talangka in the sauce, and the common addition of mussels and oysters.

An early version of pancit Malabon, known as pancit labong, uses bamboo shoots instead of noodles.

== See also ==
- Rice noodles
