= Pancit Molo =

Filipino pork dumpling soup

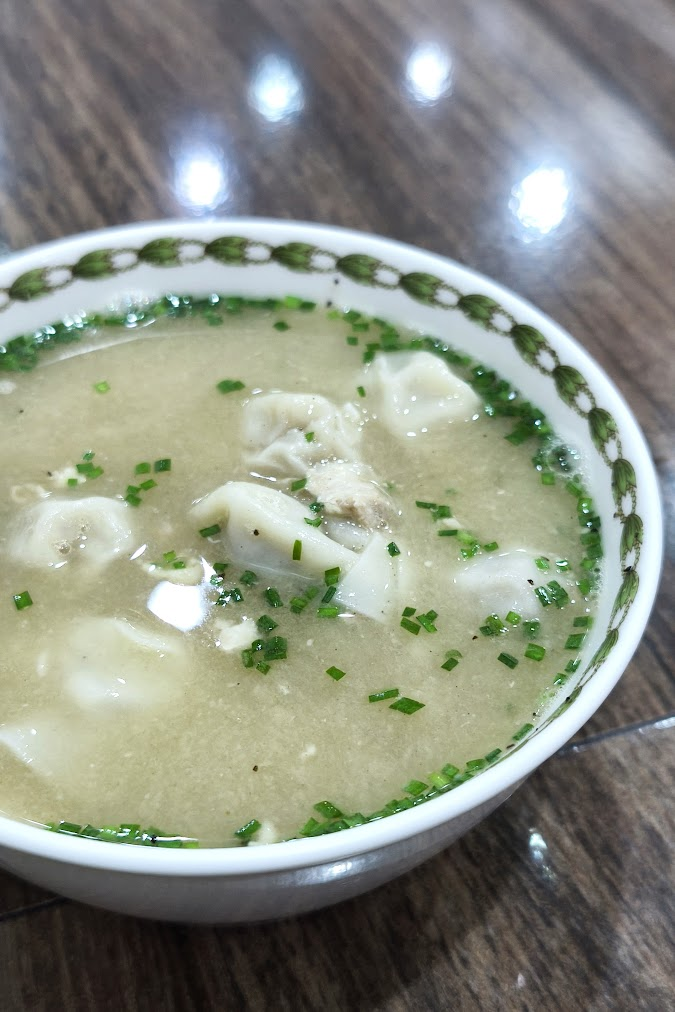
- A bowl of Pancit Molo
- Alternative names: Molo Soup; Molo Balls Soup
- Course: Soup
- Place of origin: Philippines
- Region or state: Molo, Iloilo City
- Serving temperature: Hot
- Main ingredients: Molo (or siomai/wonton), ground pork, shrimps, chopped, singkamas, carrots (chopped finely)

Pancit Molo (also Molo Soup or Molo Balls Soup) or Filipino pork dumpling soup, is a type of soup made using wonton wrappers which originated from Molo district in Iloilo City, Philippines. It consists of a mixture of ground pork wrapped in molo or wonton wrapper, shredded chicken meat, and shrimp. The soup is often ladled into serving bowls, and garnished with green onions and fried garlic bits for another layer of flavor. Pancit, which loosely translates to "noodle" is a common cuisine in the Philippines. The "noodle" acting in this dish comes from the wonton wrappers added to this dish, which draws from Chinese cuisine. Under this influence, the wontons within the soup have been compared to "siomai dumplings."

== Popularity ==
Pancit Molo is a popular dish and street food in the region Molo, Iloilo. Iloilo, sometimes called the "food haven of the Philippines" is renowned for this soup, as well as another called La Paz Batchoy. One travel guide has dubbed the soup a “must-eat”. Former Philippine President Benigno Aquino III, in 2011 during visit to the city, said in a translated quote that the soup is “delicious.” The soup itself, as well, has served as a booster for tourism in the area.

== Significance ==
There are many different variations for the recipe, but typically, creating the soup involves two steps: making the filling and making the broth. The two later get mixed to create the soup. Creating the dumplings first involves mixing the meat mixture and the spices into a bowl, and then placing the mixture onto the wonton wrapper. The wrapper is then folded into a flower shape and sealed using an egg wash. The soup is also typically served with spring onions and white pepper garnished on top.

This dish also serves significance in local and in national culture. Homemade Pancit Molo provides more familial flair compared to that found in restaurants or from street vendors. This dish is also widely featured on holiday feasts are also plentiful throughout the Philippines, especially on Christmas and Easter.

== See also ==
- La Paz Batchoy
- Philippine cuisine
