= Tinapa =

Filipino smoked fish

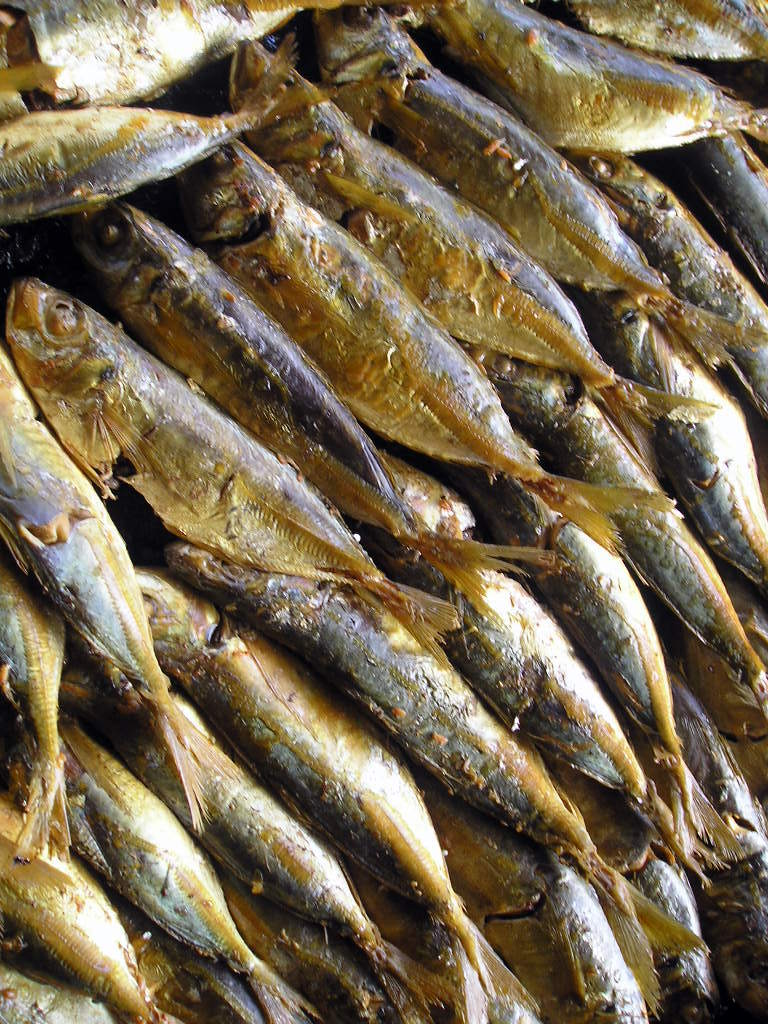
Tinapa

Tinapa is a Filipino term for fish cooked or preserved through smoking. It is a pre-colonial dish in the Philippines and is often made from blackfin scad (Alepes melanoptera, locally called galunggong) or milkfish, (locally called bangus).

Tinapa can be produced and sold commercially or prepared at home. The recipe generally involves cleaning the fish, soaking it in brine for several hours (usually 5–6), air-drying, and finally smoking the fish. Common fish used for tinapa include galunggong (scads) and bangus (milkfish).

The term tinapa means "prepared by smoking". Its root, tapa, originally referred to fish or meat preserved by smoking in Philippine languages. During the Spanish colonial period, tapa came to refer to meats preserved by other methods. Tinapa is derived from Proto-Malayo-Polynesian *tapa, which in turn comes from Proto-Austronesian *Capa.

The term tinapa has also come to describe modern canned sardines in tomato sauce, although these are not always smoked.

== See also ==
- Tortang sardinas
- Daing
- Odong
