= Lumpiang gulay =

Filipino spring roll

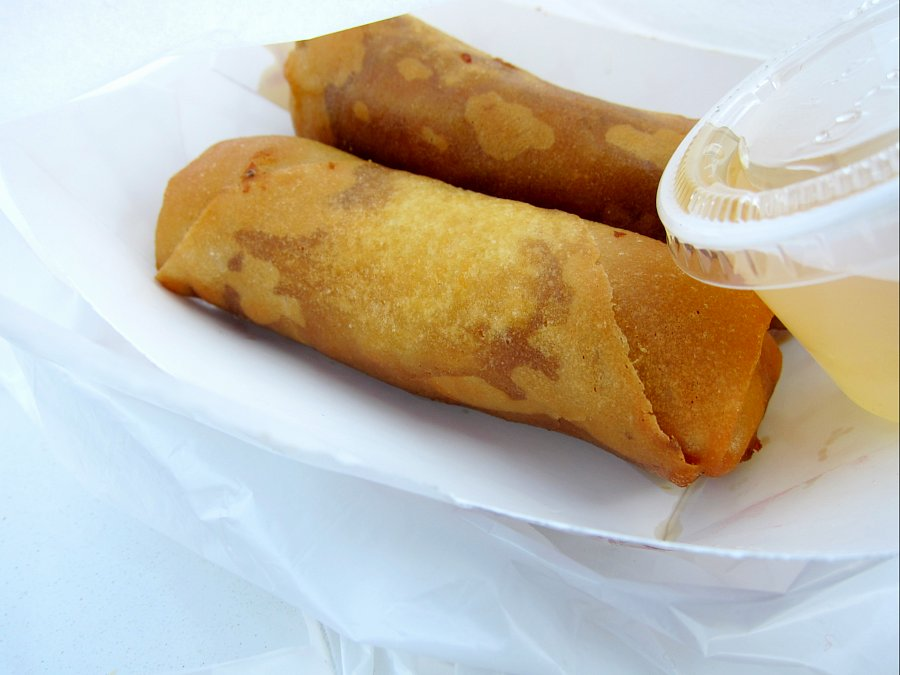
- Alternative names: Lumpiyang gulay, vegetable lumpia
- Course: Appetizer
- Place of origin: Philippines
- Serving temperature: Hot, warm
- Main ingredients: Lumpia wrapper
- Variations: Lumpiang togue vegetarian lumpia

Lumpiang gulay, also known as vegetable lumpia, is a Filipino appetizer consisting of julienned or cubed vegetables with ground meat or shrimp in a thin lumpia wrapper made from rice flour that is deep-fried. A notable variant of lumpiang gulay is lumpiang togue, which is made mostly with togue (mung bean sprouts).

Despite the name, lumpiang gulay is not a vegetarian dish by default, though vegetarian lumpia, a vegetarian variant, can be created from the basic recipe.

== Description ==
Typical ingredients in lumpiang gulay include carrots, kamote (sweet potato), onions, garlic, shallots, cabbage or lettuce, potatoes, singkamas (jicama), sitaw (green beans), sayote (chayote), and togue (mung bean sprouts). It is mixed with a small amount of ground meat, meat strips, and/or shrimp. Fish flakes can also be used. The meat is simmered for a few minutes before adding the rest of the ingredients. They are then wrapped in lumpia wrapper and deep-fried. The vegetables can alternatively be stir-fried. The ingredients of lumpiang gulay are roughly the same as the ingredients of lumpiang sariwa variants, except that lumpiang gulay is fried.

It is traditionally eaten dipped in vinegar or agre dulce, but other types of dipping sauces can also be used. It is sometimes also known as lumpiang prito, a generic name for any fried lumpia versions.

Lumpiang gulay is distinguished from other types of lumpia (especially lumpiang Shanghai) in that it has a greater ratio of vegetables to meat. It is also typically thicker in diameter than lumpiang Shanghai because it has more fillings. Other types of lumpia like lumpiang ubod, lumpiang labong, and lumpiang singkamas are generally regarded as different dishes, as they can be served fresh or fried, unlike lumpiang gulay which is always served as lumpiang prito (deep-fried).

== Variants ==
Lumpia is commonly served with vinegar as seasoning.

=== Lumpiang togue ===
A popular variant of lumpiang gulay is lumpiang togue, also known as "bean sprouts lumpia" or "bean sprouts egg roll". It is prepared roughly the same as lumpiang gulay with mostly the same ingredients. The main difference is that lumpiang togue uses more togue (mung bean sprouts) as the main ingredients, replacing the main filler of lumpiang gulay (usually cabbage).

=== Vegetarian lumpia ===
Despite the name, lumpiang gulay is typically not vegetarian. However, vegetarian versions can be made from both lumpiang gulay and lumpiang togue which do not use meat at all. They typically also include mushrooms or tokwa (tofu). These are differentiated as "vegetarian lumpia", which can be served fresh or fried. A pescetarian version can also be made with just chopped shrimp or fish flakes. Unlike lumpiang gulay and lumpiang togue, vegetarian lumpia can be served either as lumpiang prito (fried) or lumpiang sariwa (fresh).

Vegan versions of lumpiang gulay can also be created. Though the lumpia wrappers used will need to be the vegan versions (without eggs).

== In popular culture ==
The vegetarian lumpia was featured on the Netflix TV series Street Food in the Cebu, Philippines episode.

== See also ==
- Dinamita
- Lumpiang Shanghai
- Siopao
