= Ngohiong =

Filipino appetizer

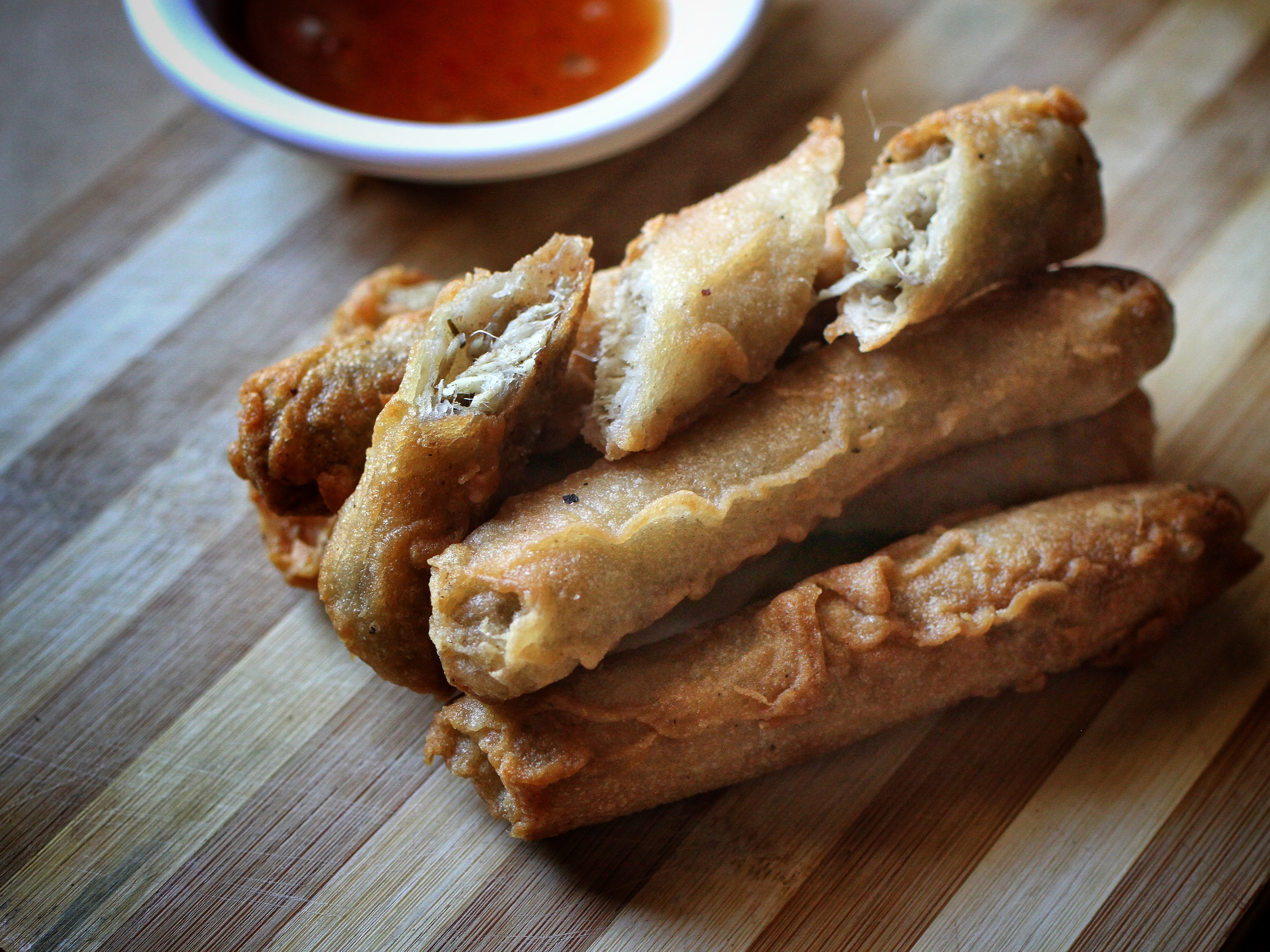
- Ngohiong
- Alternative names: Ngoyong, Ngo yong, Ngo hiong, lumpiang ngohiong
- Course: Appetizer
- Place of origin: Philippines
- Region or state: Cebu City
- Serving temperature: Hot, warm
- Main ingredients: Lumpia wrapper, ground meat/shrimp, jicama/heart of palm, five-spice powder

Ngohiong, also known and pronounced as ngoyong, is a Filipino appetizer consisting of julienned or cubed vegetables with ground meat or shrimp seasoned with five-spice powder in a thin egg crêpe that is deep-fried. It is a type of lumpia and is a Filipino adaptation of the Hokkien dish ngo hiang (known as kikiam in the Philippines). It originates from Cebu City.

== Description ==
Ngohiong derives its name from the Hokkien dish ngo hiang, which is known more generally as kikiam in the Philippines. Despite this, ngohiong resembles the Filipino lumpia more than kikiam. Ngohiong is prepared identically to most Filipino lumpia, with the only difference being the use of five-spice powder for seasoning. It is generally made with ground pork or shrimp, garlic, onions, spring onions, five-spice powder, black pepper, and julienned jicama or heart of palm. They are all mixed and wrapped in a lumpia wrapper (which is sometimes further coated in batter). It is deep fried and served with an agre dulce (sweet and sour) or spicy chili sauce.

Ngohiong and kikiam should not be confused with the "kikiam sticks" or "tempura sticks" sold by street food vendors, especially in Manila. The latter dishes are not related and are instead a variant of fish balls made largely with flour.

== See also ==
- Dinamita
- Lumpiang Shanghai
