= Tequeño =

Latin American fried cheese bread dish

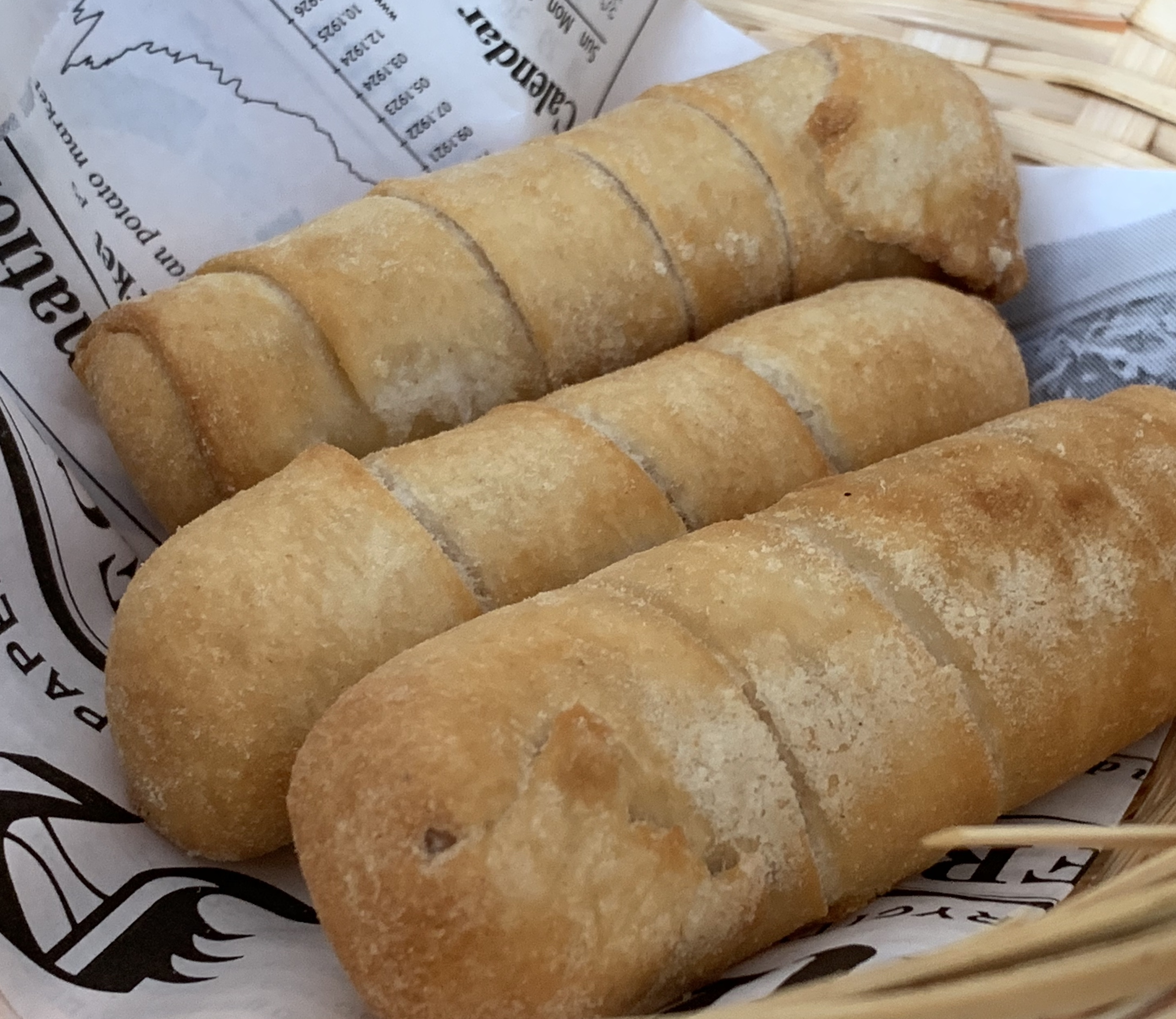
- Type: Bread
- Course: Snack
- Place of origin: Venezuela
- Region or state: Los Teques
- Main ingredients: Bread dough, masa de harina de trigo, queso blanco

Tequeño is a fried spear of wheat dough stuffed with semi-hard queso blanco (white cheese), and is a popular meal or snack in Venezuela. To prepare it, the dough is wrapped around a cheesestick, formed into a breadstick and then fried or sometimes oven-baked. Tequeños can be eaten for breakfast, as an appetizer, or as a snack at parties and weddings. 21 October is the International Tequeño Day, and it was declared a cultural heritage of Venezuela on 20 April 2023.

Due to the influx of Venezuelan immigrants into these countries over the past few years, it has become increasingly popular in Spain and Argentina, among other countries.

On 21 October 2023, in Los Teques, a tequeño of 15.3 m (50.2 ft) was made to commemorate the city's 246th anniversary, beating the previous Guinness World Record of 5 m (16.4 ft). The dish required a 18 m fryer and 32 kitchen assistants to prepare it.

== Origin ==
One of the most widely accepted versions is that they were invented by the Báez sisters, who lived in Los Teques, in 1912. They named their improvised creation “quesitos enrollados” (little rolled up cheeses) and started to sell them in the city and, after some time even sold them in Caracas where they gained great popularity. Another version says that some time in the 19th century an affluent family was vacationing in Los Teques, and one of their cooks served them this dish, which they named tequeños in honor of the town.

Some believe that it actually dates back to the 1700s in the now gone neighborhood of El Teque in Caracas, which is also located in Venezuela.

== Variations ==
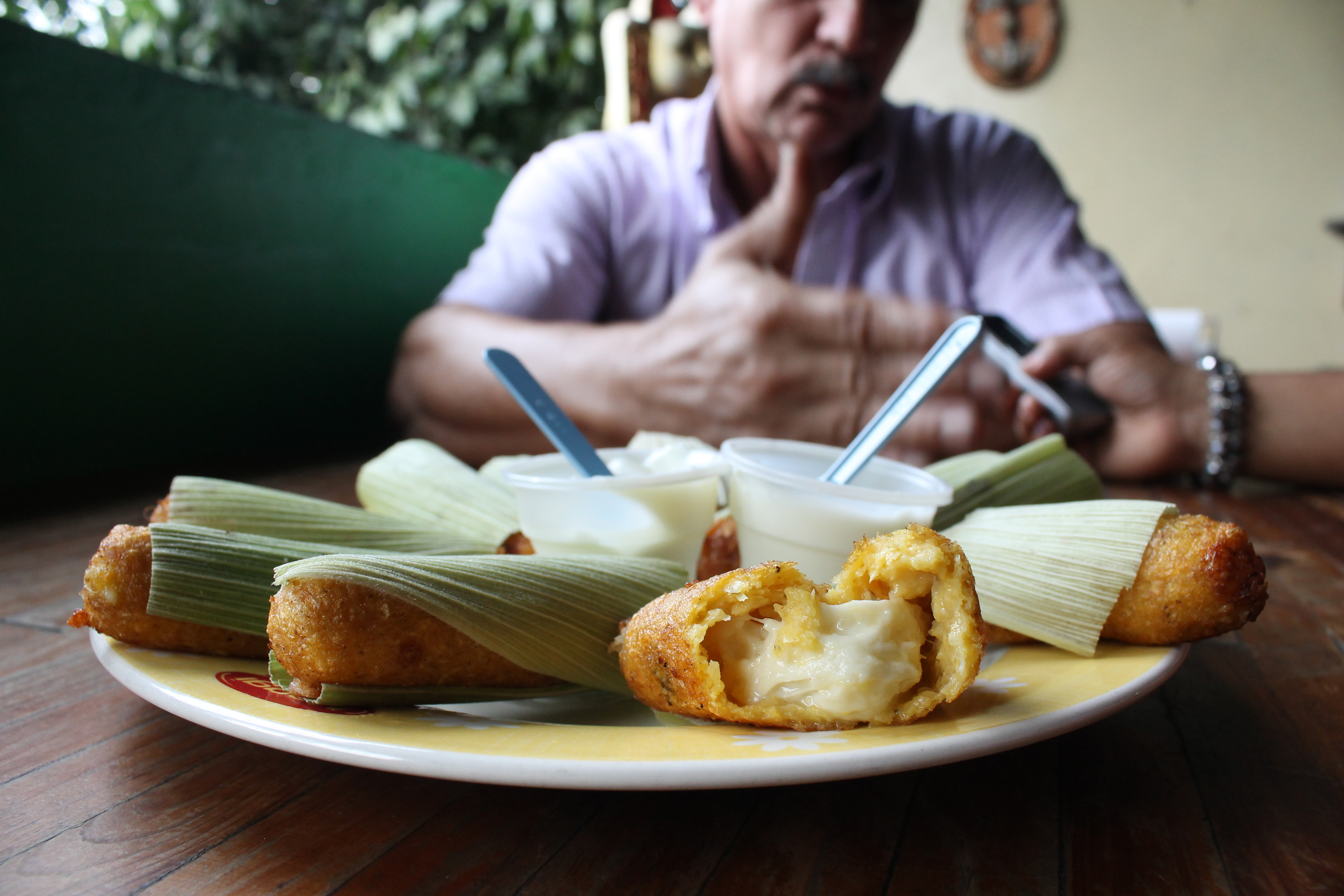
Tequeños de jojoto

Traditional tequeños are filled with semi-hard cheese; however, people often make and sell them with many different varieties of fillings. Some of the most popular fillings include: gouda, chocolate, cheese and bocadillo de guayaba, cheese and chocolate, ricotta and spinach, cheese and ham, and even chorizo in some markets in Spain. They are also consumed by themselves or accompanied by a dipping sauce. A few variations even have their own names:

- Tequeñón, a bigger version of the traditional tequeño. It is offered as a breakfast option in some schools.
- Tequeyoyos, believed to have originated in the state of Zulia, are filled with cheese and ripe plantains.
- Tequeños de jojoto, popular in Carabobo and thought to have been invented at a small business in La Entrada, are made with a corn dough similar to that of the cachapa.

== See also ==
- Lumpiang keso
- Mozzarella sticks
- Sigara böreği
- Sorullos
- List of breads
