= Lumpia =

Chinese Indonesian and Filipino spring roll

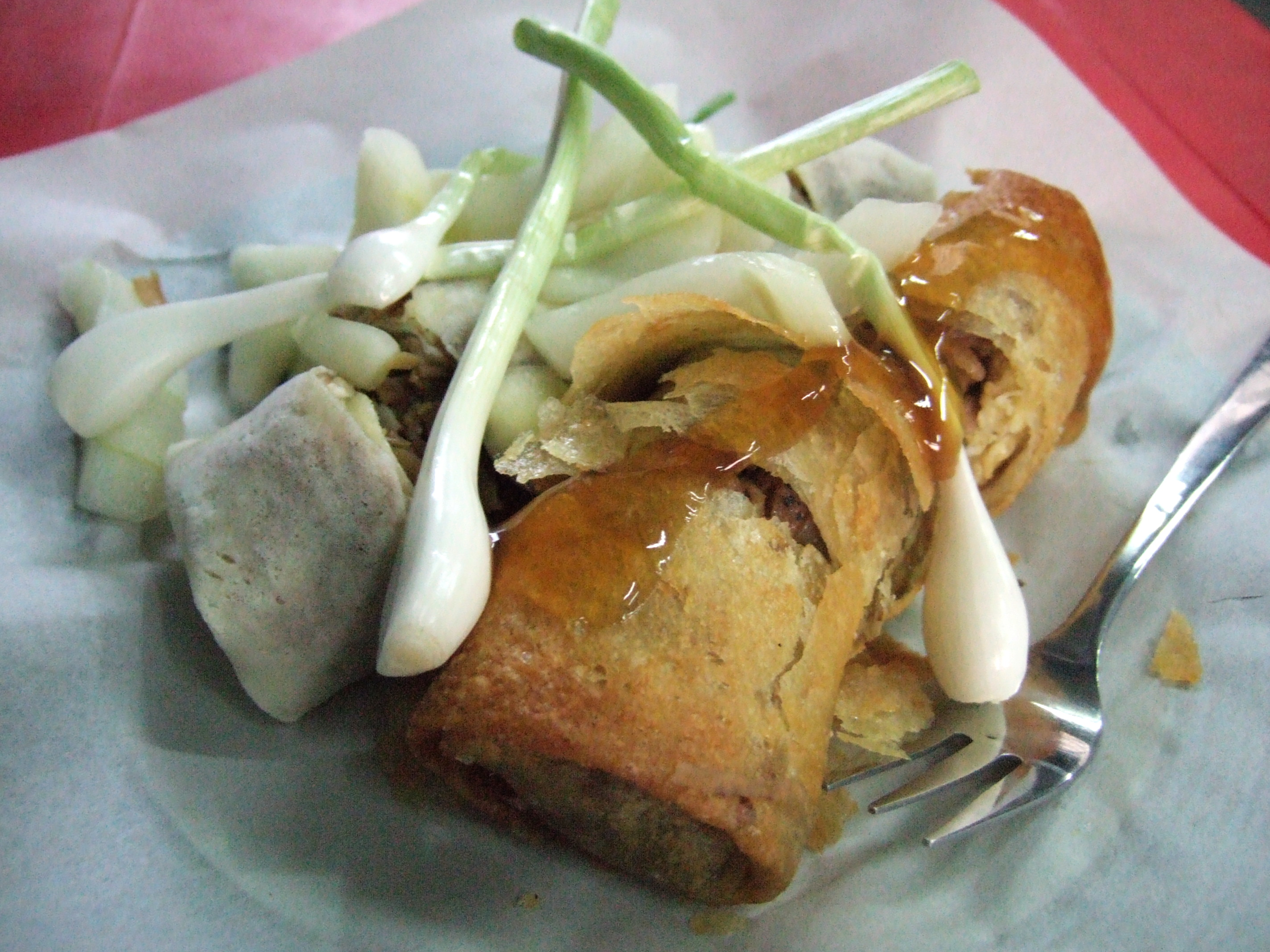
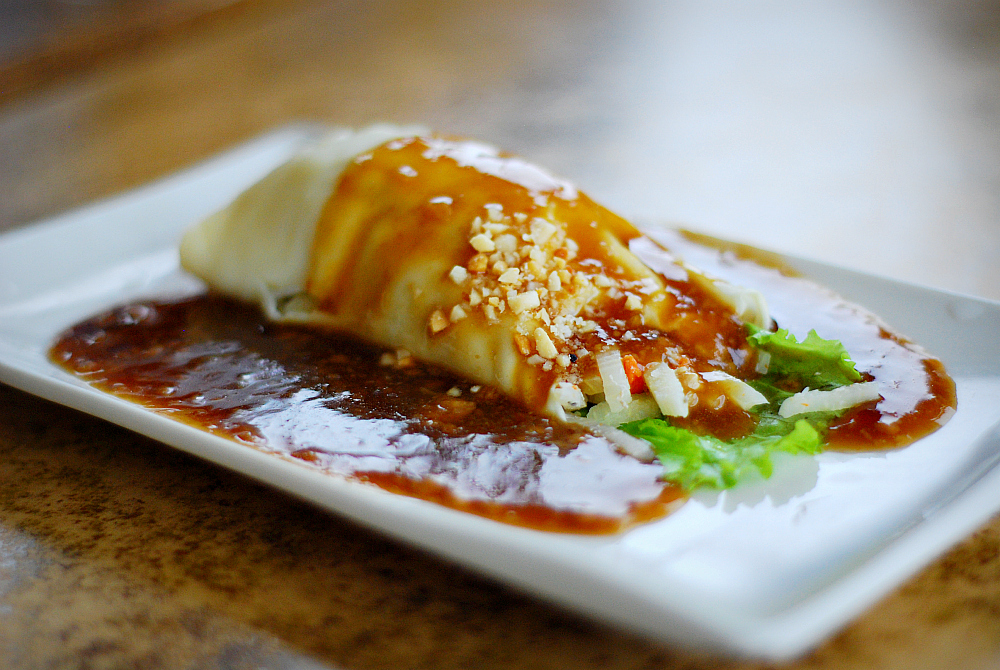
- Top: Fried and unfried lumpia Semarang from Indonesia; Bottom: Fresh lumpiang ubod made with heart of palm from the Philippines
- Alternative names: Loempia, loenpia, ngohyong
- Course: Main course, appetizer or snack
- Place of origin: Indonesia; Philippines
- Region or state: Indonesia, Philippines, Netherlands, Belgium, and Suriname
- Serving temperature: Hot or room temperature
- Main ingredients: Wrapper, meat, vegetables
- Variations: Fried or fresh

Lumpia (in Indonesian and Filipino) are various types of spring rolls commonly found in Indonesian and Filipino cuisines. Lumpia are made of thin paper-like or crêpe-like pastry skin called "lumpia wrapper" enveloping savory or sweet fillings. It is often served as an appetizer or snack, and might be served deep-fried or fresh (unfried). Lumpia are Indonesian and Filipino adaptations of the Fujianese lūn-piáⁿ (潤餅) and Teochew popiah (薄餅), usually consumed during Qingming Festival.

In Indonesia, lumpia is a favorite snack, and is known as a street hawker food in the country. Lumpia was introduced by Chinese settlers to Indonesia during colonial times possibly in the 19th century.

In the Philippines, lumpia is one of the most common dishes served in gatherings and celebrations.

In the Netherlands and Belgium it is spelled loempia, the old Indonesian spelling, which has also become the generic name for any spring roll in the Dutch language, regardless of origin or location.

== Etymology ==
The name lumpia (in Indonesian and Filipino), sometimes spelled as lunpia, was derived from Hokkien spelling /lun˩piã˥˧/ (潤餅, POJ: lūn-piáⁿ), lun (潤, POJ: lūn) means "wet/moist/soft", while pia (餅, POJ: piáⁿ) means "cake/pastry", thus lun-pia means "soft cake". It is referred to as rùnbǐng (潤餅) or báobǐng, bóbǐng (薄餅) in Mandarin, and also as bópíjuǎn (薄皮卷).

In neighboring Malaysia and Singapore, lumpia is known in its variant name as popiah, from Teochew or Hokkien, pronounced as /poʔ˩piã˥˧/ (薄餅, Peng'im: boh⁸ bian², POJ: po̍h-piáⁿ), which means "thin wafer".

== Indonesia ==
Lumpia was introduced by Chinese settlers of Fujian origin to the Dutch East Indies, possibly in the 19th century. According to local tradition circulated in Semarang, Central Java, lumpia was introduced by a Chinese settler named Tjoa Thay Yoe, a migrant from China who settled in Semarang by the end of the 19th century. At that time, Tjoa was selling a variety of foods made from pork and also bamboo shoots at Pasar Johar, Semarang. It was then that he met Wasih, a native Javanese woman food vendor who sold food made from shrimp and potato. Thay Yoe and Wasih eventually got married, and subsequently they created and sold food together by removing the pork element to cater for local consumers that mostly are Muslims. The food that was created was lumpia Semarang which is known to this day. The couple then had a daughter named Tjoa Po Nio, who continued her parents' business by selling lumpia Semarang spring rolls.

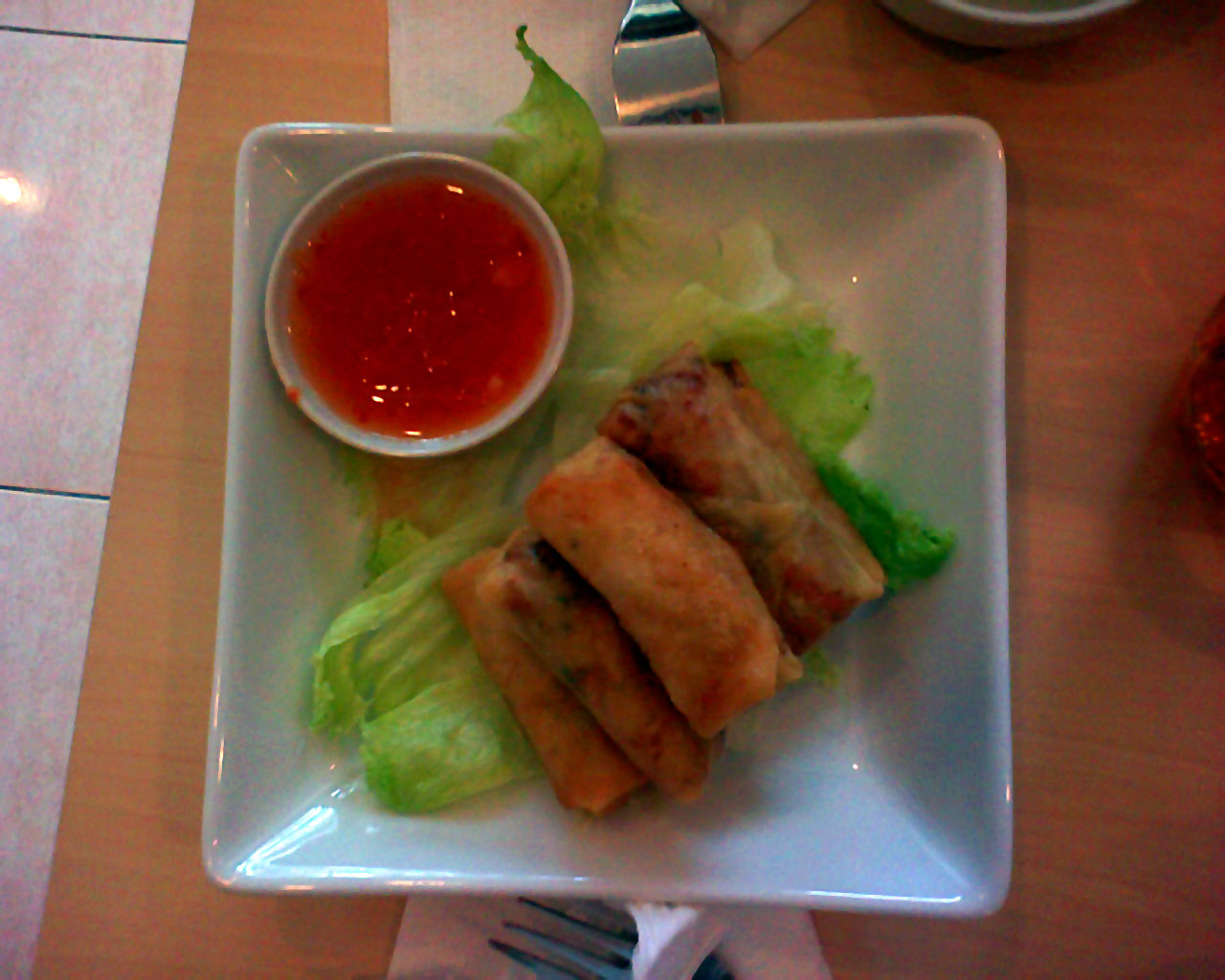
Lumpia in Indonesia might be served in various dipping sauces, from sweet palm sugar sauce, savoury tauco or peanut sauce, to popular chili sauce. This one is served with sweet hot and spicy sambal chili sauce.

Chinese influence is evident in Indonesian cuisine, such as bakmi, mie ayam, pangsit, mie goreng, kwetiau goreng, nasi goreng, bakso, and lumpia. Throughout the country, spring rolls are generally called lumpia; however, sometimes an old Chinese Indonesian spelling is used: loen pia.

In Indonesia lumpia is associated with Chinese Indonesian cuisine and commonly found in cities where significant Chinese Indonesian settles. Although some local variants exist and the filling ingredients may vary, the most popular variant is Lumpia Semarang, available in fried or unfried variants. In Indonesia, lumpia variants usually named after the city where the recipe originates, with Semarang as the most famous variant. It represents creativity and the localisation of lumpia recipes according to locally available ingredients and local tastes.

Unlike its Philippines counterpart, Indonesian lumpia rarely uses minced pork as a filling. This was meant to cater to the larger Muslim clientele, thus popular fillings are usually chicken, shrimp, egg and vegetables. Indonesian lumpia is commonly filled with seasoned chopped rebung (bamboo shoots) with minced chicken or prawns, served with fresh baby shallots or leeks in sweet tauco (fermented soy) based sauce. In addition to being made at home, lumpia is also offered as street food sold by traveling vendor on carts, sold in foodstalls specializing on Lumpia Semarang, or sold in traditional marketplaces as part of kue (Indonesian traditional snack) or jajan pasar (market munchies). Simpler and cheaper lumpia is sold as part of gorengan (Indonesian fritters). Indonesians are noted for their fondness of hot and spicy food, and therefore spicy hot sambal chili sauce or fresh bird's eye chili are usually added as a dipping sauce or condiment.

=== Lumpia Semarang ===
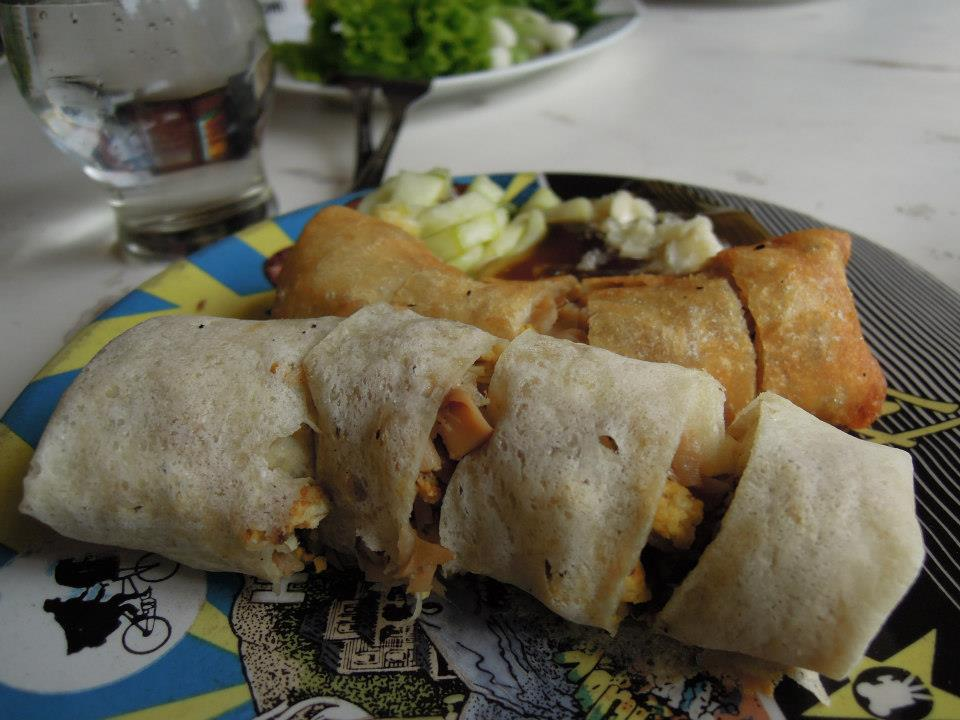
Lumpia Semarang, specialty of Semarang city, Central Java

Named after the capital city of Central Java in Indonesia, Semarang, where significant Chinese Indonesian have settled, lumpia Semarang is perhaps the most popular lumpia variant in Indonesia. It has become associated with the city, and the spring rolls are often sought by the visitors in Semarang as food gift or souvenir. Originally made by Chinese immigrants, this lumpia is filled with bamboo shoots, dried shrimp, chicken or prawns. It is served with a sweet chili sauce made from dried shrimp (optional), coconut sugar, red chili peppers, bird's eye chili peppers, ground white pepper, tapioca starch, water, and baby shallots. Lumpia Semarang is served either deep-fried or unfried, as the filling is already cooked. Other variants of lumpia Semarang is filled with goat or crab meat.

=== Lumpia Jakarta ===
Named after Indonesian capital city, Jakarta, this lumpia is usually deep-fried and sold as a gorengan fritter snack. Unlike the popular Semarang lumpia that uses rebung or bamboo shoots, Jakarta lumpia uses bengkuang or jicama, and is served with the typical Indonesian sambal kacang or spicy peanut sauce as a dipping sauce.

=== Lumpia Bogor ===
Named after Bogor, a city in West Java, this lumpia filling is similar to the Jakarta lumpia variant; it uses jicama, as well as tofu and ebi dried shrimp. Unlike in other regions, where lumpia are usually served fried, Bogor lumpia are usually grilled on a hot iron, giving it a distinctive aroma. In addition, Bogor lumpia is usually shaped in a pillow-shaped rectangle and quite large in size.

=== Lumpia Bandung ===
Named after the city of Bandung in West Java, it is a variant of lumpia basah or fresh and wet lumpia that is not deep-fried. However, unlike the common elongated shape, lumpia Bandung is not served in spring roll form, but the lumpia skin is spread, topped with fillings, stacked and folded square just like an envelope. Unlike the Semarang style lumpia, which uses bamboo shoots and minced chicken, Bandung style lumpia uses julienned jicama, beansprout, scallion, garlic, chili, and scrambled egg as fillings, and is served with palm sugar sauce.

=== Lumpia Surabaya ===
Named after the city of Surabaya in East Java, where this lumpia was originally made. It is made of mostly the same ingredients of lumpia semarang, but much less sweet in taste. Lumpia Surabaya might use bamboo shoots, corn, or slices of sausages as fillings, and is served with sambal chili sauce and tauco fermented soybean paste as dipping sauce.

=== Lumpia Yogyakarta ===
Although Yogyakarta is quite close to Semarang city, Yogyakarta also has a different type of lumpia. The typical lumpia of Yogyakarta usually contain jicama, bean sprouts, carrots, and minced chicken meat. Boiled quail eggs and glass noodles are sometimes added as fillings as well. 'Yogya lumpia' is usually served with acar pickles, chilies, and toppings made from crushed garlic and jicama. The generous use of garlic and pickles as garnish is meant to refresh and neutralize the otherwise oiliness of the deep-fried lumpia.

=== Lumpia Medan ===
Originating from Medan city of North Sumatra, this lumpia version is more akin to popiah of neighboring Malaysia and Singapore. Thus, in Medan, lumpia is more commonly referred to as popiah. Medan popiah or lumpia is a large fresh unfried spring roll, consumed not as a snack, but as a main meal. This is because Medan lumpias are made in large sizes with rich fillings, including bamboo shoots, scrambled eggs, peanuts, shrimp, crabs, and more.

=== Lumpia goreng ===
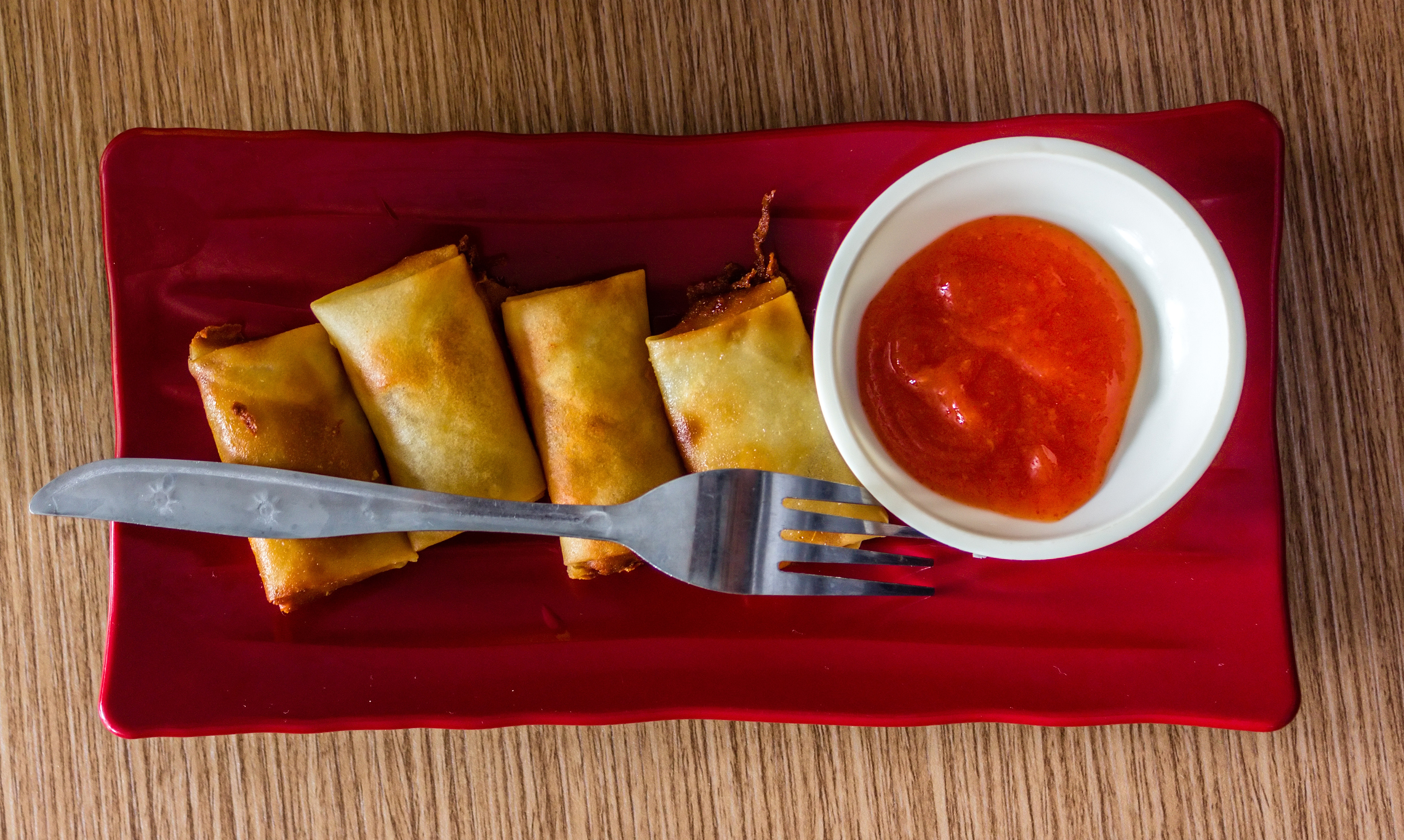
Smaller size deep fried lumpia served with sambal hot sauce, sold as a snack in Purwokerto Train Station, Central Java

Lumpia goreng is a simple fried spring roll filled with vegetables; the spring roll wrappers are filled with chopped carrots cut into matchstick-size, shredded cabbage, and sometimes mushrooms. Although usually filled only with vegetables, the fried spring rolls might be enriched with minced beef, chicken, or prawns. There is also a common, cheap and simple variant of fried lumpia, eaten not as a single dish but as part of assorted gorengan (Indonesian fritters) snack, sold together with fried battered tempeh, tofu, oncom, sweet potato and cassava. It is only filled with bihun (rice vermicelli) with chopped carrots and cabbages, and is usually eaten with fresh bird's eye chili pepper. The sliced lumpia goreng is also the ingredient of soto mie (noodle soto).

=== Lumpia basah ===
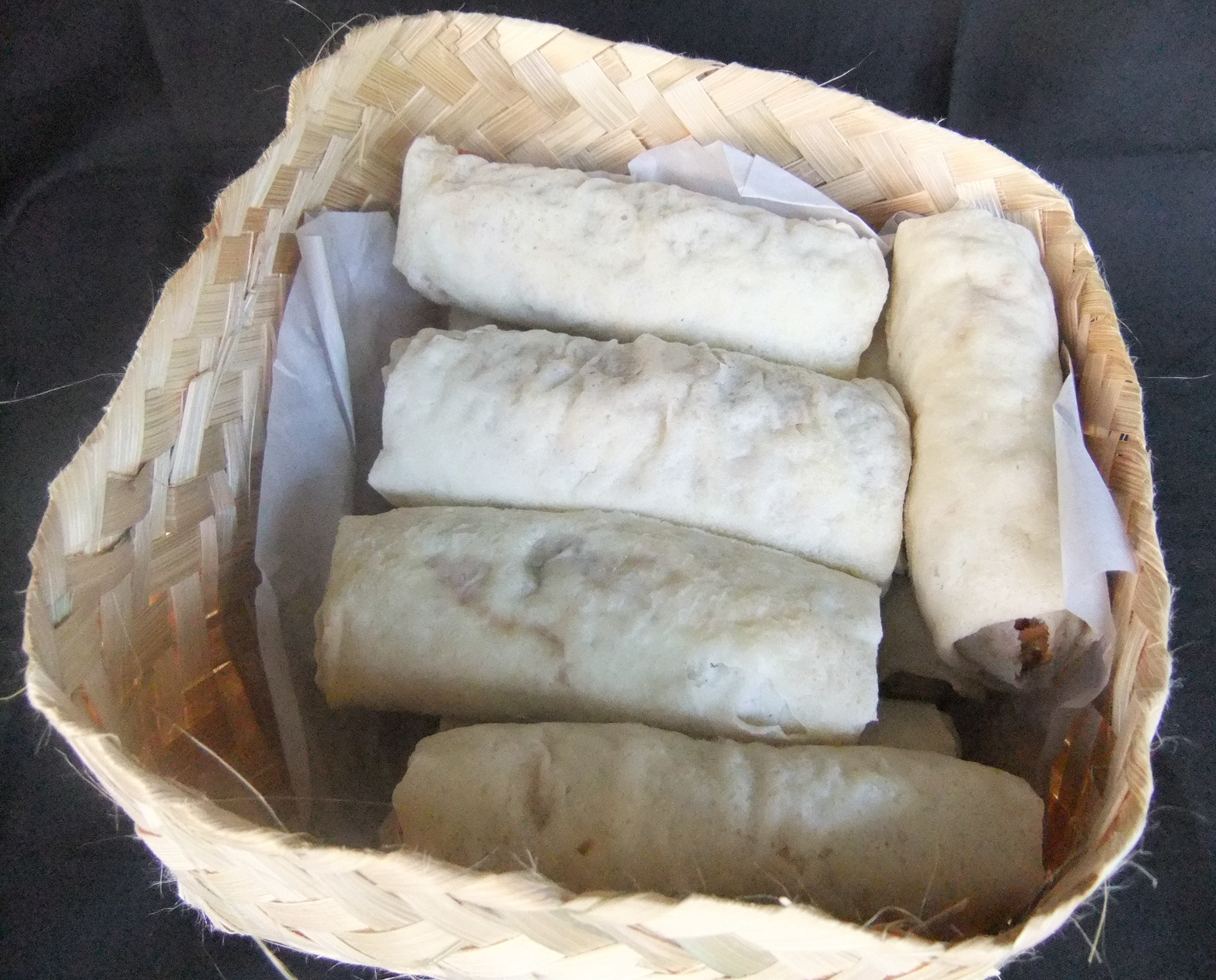
Lumpia basah (fresh, unfried lumpia)

It literally means "wet spring roll", or often translated as "fresh spring roll" which means spring roll without frying. It is similar to the Vietnamese spring roll with bean sprouts, carrots, shrimp or chicken and served with sweet tauco (another Hokkien word for salted soybeans) sauce.

=== Lumpia ayam ===
This popular appetizer in Indonesia is chicken lumpia, with fillings including shredded chicken, sliced carrot, onion and garlic; and seasoned with sugar, salt and pepper. In Yogyakarta, there is a popular chicken lumpia variant called Lumpia Mutiara, sold in front of Mutiara Hotel in Malioboro street.

=== Lumpia sayur ===
Vegetarian lumpia, usually filled with glass noodles, shredded cabbage, lettuce, julienned carrots, minced garlic and celery, seasoned with soy sauce and sweet chili sauce. Most of cheaper lumpia sold as part of Indonesian gorengan (fritters) are lumpia sayur or vegetables lumpia, that contains only bits of carrots and bihun rice glass noodles.

=== Lumpia mercon ===
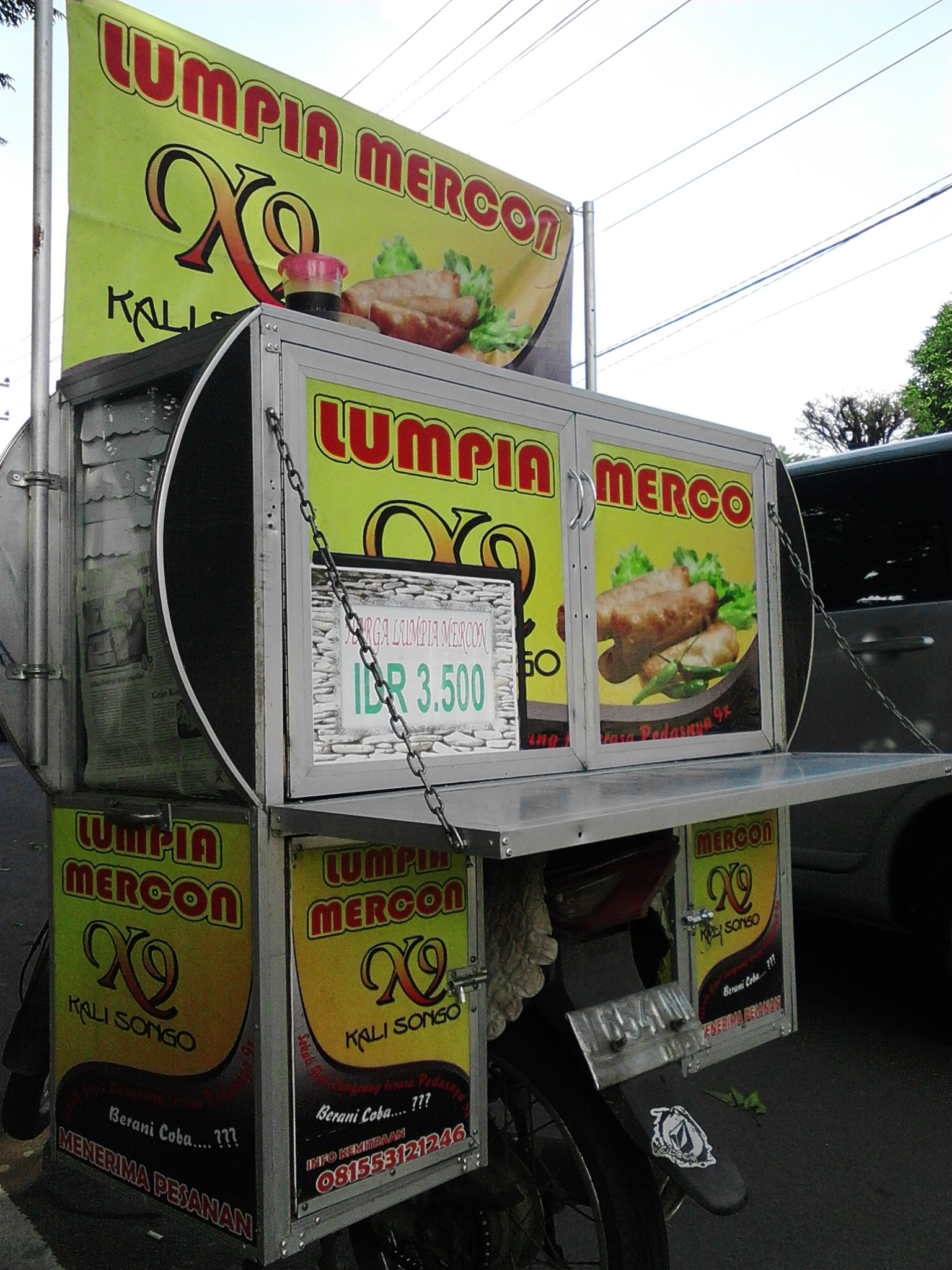
Lumpia mercon (lit. firecracker lumpia) traveling vendor mounted on a motorcycle, Sidoarjo, East Java

The name lumpia mercon (lit. firecracker lumpia) implies that this lumpia is extra hot and spicy, filled with slices of cabe rawit or bird's eye chili, a small type of chili that is very spicy and much hotter than a common jalapeño. This lumpia demonstrates the Indonesian fondness for extra hot and spicy food.

=== Lumpia mini ===
This is a bite size smaller lumpia snack, a skin pastry crepe the same as with common lumpia; however, it is filled only with abon (beef floss) or ebi (dried prawn floss).

=== Lumpia duleg ===
Lumpia duleg, also known as lumpia delanggu or sosis kecut (sour sausages) is a simple and cheap lumpia snack from Delanggu subdistrict, Klaten Regency, Central Java, a town located between Yogyakarta and Semarang. It is a small finger-sized lumpia filled with mung bean sprouts (tauge) with slightly sour flavour.

=== Lumpia tahu ===
Another vegetarian lumpia in Indonesia is lumpia tahu or tofu lumpia. It is filled with tofu and diced carrot, lightly seasoned, and deep-fried. Usually, its size is smaller than common lumpia, and consumed as a snack. Sometimes beaten egg and chopped scallion might be added to the filling mixture.

=== Lumpia telur ===
This simple and cheap street food is a popular snack among Indonesian school children. Lumpia telur is an egg lumpia, which is lumpia skin placed upon a hot flat pan, topped with beaten egg and chopped scallion, folded, and fried with cooking oil. Sometimes slices of sausages are added. The shape is not cylindrical like a common spring roll, but rather a flat half-circle, drizzled with kecap manis sweet soy sauce and chili sambal. It is often regarded as a hybrid between lumpia and egg martabak.

=== Lumpia jantung pisang ===
Lumpia with filling made of jantung pisang (lit. banana's heart) which refer to banana blossom bud, mixed with eggs, seasoned with shallot, garlic, turmeric and pepper, served in hot sambal chili sauce.

=== Lumpia pisang ===
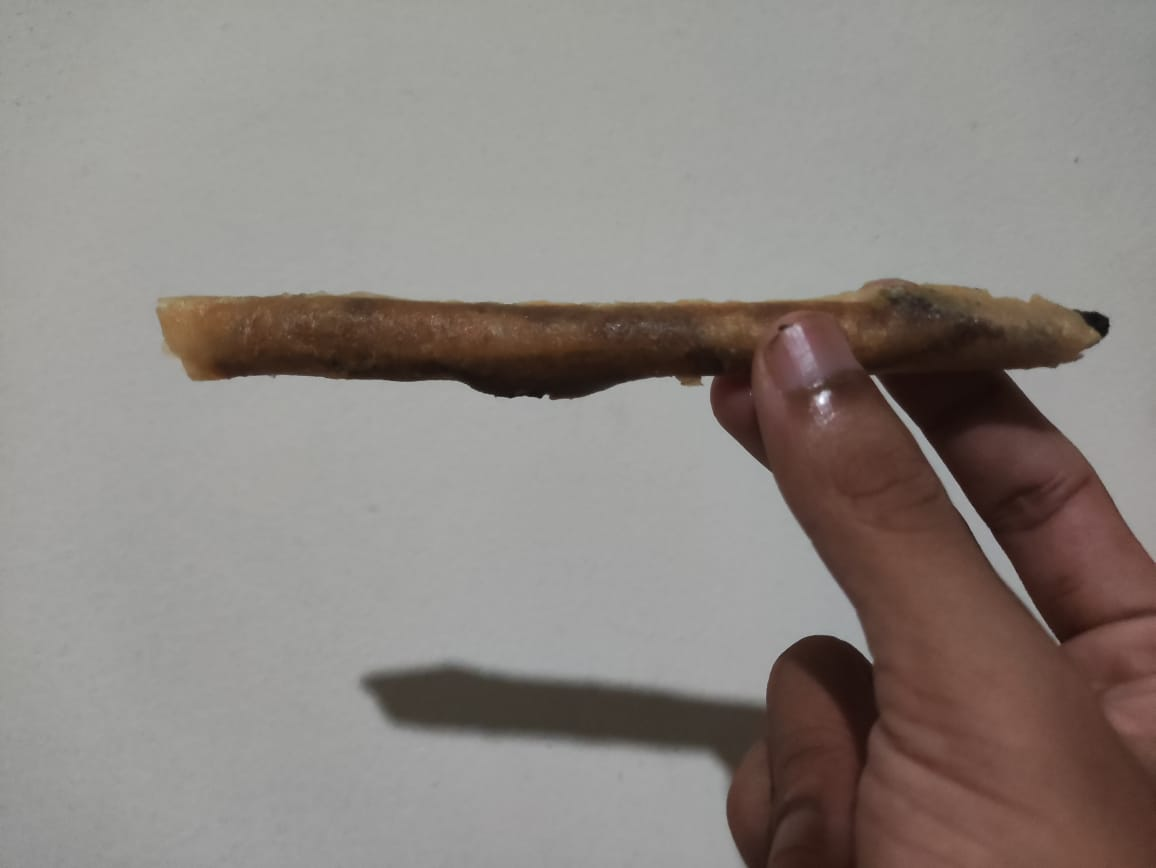
Lumpia pisang, a snack specialty from Bojonegoro

Lumpia pisang or abbreviated as lumpis is a sale pisang, a processed banana made by drying and smoking processes and dried in the sun, wrapped in lumpia wrapper.

=== Lumpia udang mayones ===
Seafood lumpia, filled with shrimp, diced carrots, scallions, garlic and mayonnaise. Actually, the popularity of mayonnaise-filled snack was started by another Indonesian popular snack called rissole. Rissole is quite similar to lumpia, with the difference in skin texture – in which rissoles' skin is thicker, softer, and breaded. This novelty risole recipe with mayo flavor then spin-off using lumpia skin to become a new lumpia variant.

=== Piscok ===
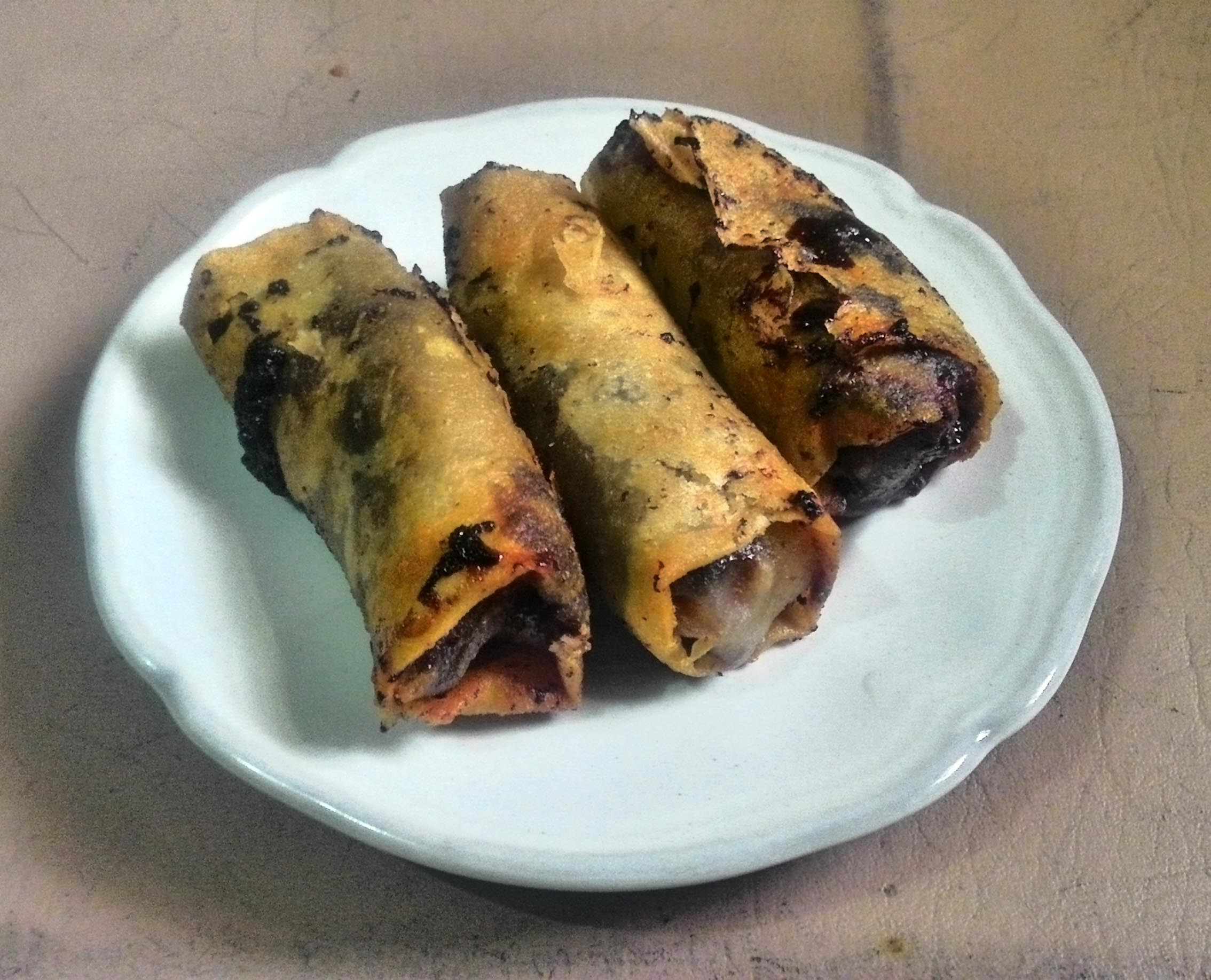
Pisang Cokelat, choco-banana spring roll

Piscok is an abbreviation of pisang cokelat (banana chocolate in Indonesian). It is a sweet snack made of pieces of banana with chocolate syrup, wrapped inside lumpia skin and being deep fried. Pisang cokelat is often simply described as "choco banana spring rolls". It is often regarded as a hybrid between another Indonesian favourites; pisang goreng (fried banana) and lumpia (spring roll).

The type of banana being used is similar to pisang goreng; preferably pisang uli, pisang kepok or pisang raja sereh. Pisang cokelat is almost identical to Philippines turon, except in this Indonesian version chocolate content is a must.

=== Sumpia ===
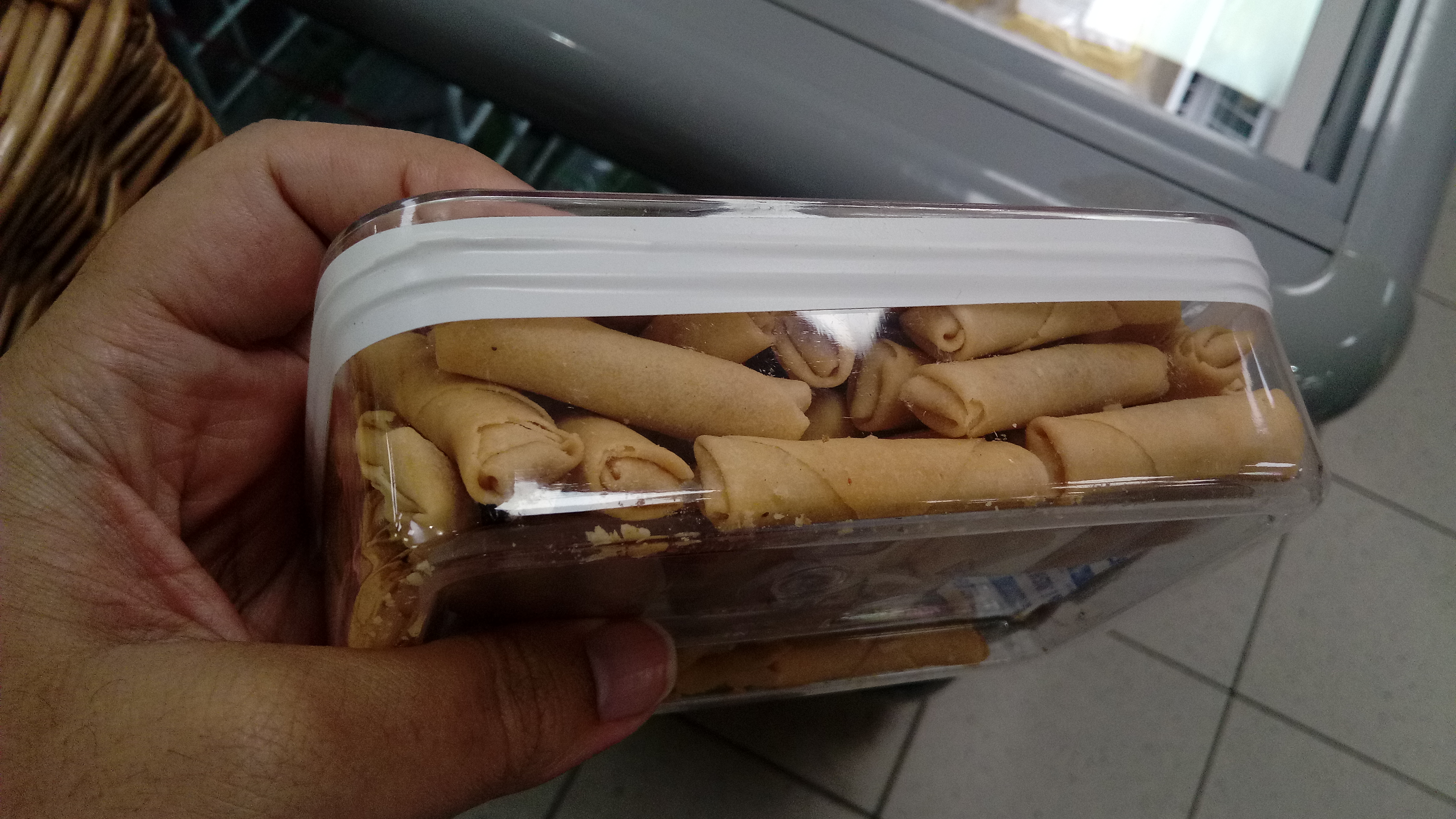
Sumpia, a finger-sized small lumpia, as a snack

The much smaller and drier lumpia with similar beef or prawn floss filling is called sumpia. Its diameter is about the same as human finger. In Indonesia, the most common filling for sumpia is ebi or dried shrimp floss, spiced with coriander, lemon leaf, garlic and shallot. These miniature lumpias are deep fried in ample of palm oil until golden brown and crispy. Sumpia has a more crunchy and drier texture and is often consumed as a savory kue snack.

== Philippines ==
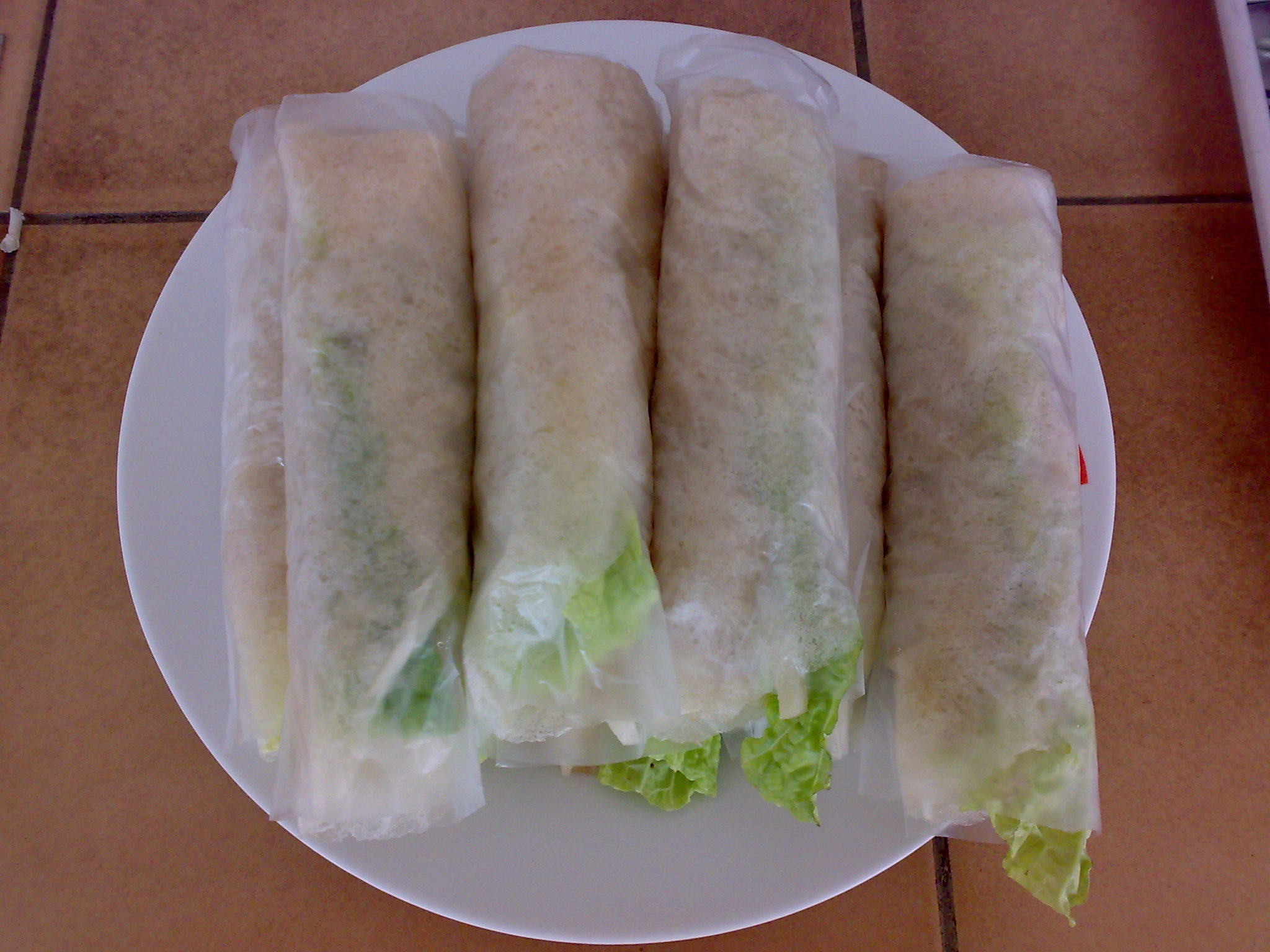
Fresh lumpiang ubod made with heart of palm

Lumpia was introduced to the Philippines by early Hokkien immigrants from Fujian. They have been thoroughly nativized to Philippine cuisine and are found throughout the islands. They use various fillings inspired by local ingredients and dishes, and the later cuisines of Spain, China, and the United States.

Filipino lumpia can be differentiated from other Asian spring roll versions in that they use a paper-thin wrapper made from just flour, water, and salt. They were also traditionally slender and long, with a shape roughly similar to that of cigars or cigarillos, though modern versions can come in various shapes and sizes. The thinness of the crêpe and the shape of the lumpia give them a relatively denser wrapping that nevertheless remains flaky and light in texture. They are also traditionally dipped in agre dulce (sweet and sour sauce), vinegar-based sauces, banana ketchup, or sweet chili sauce. Fresh lumpia, however, have wrappers that are more crêpe-like and thicker due to the addition of eggs (though still thinner than other Asian versions). They are closer in texture to the original Chinese versions and were traditionally made with rice flour which makes them chewier. Various kinds of lumpia, fried or fresh, are ubiquitous in Filipino celebrations like fiestas or Christmas.

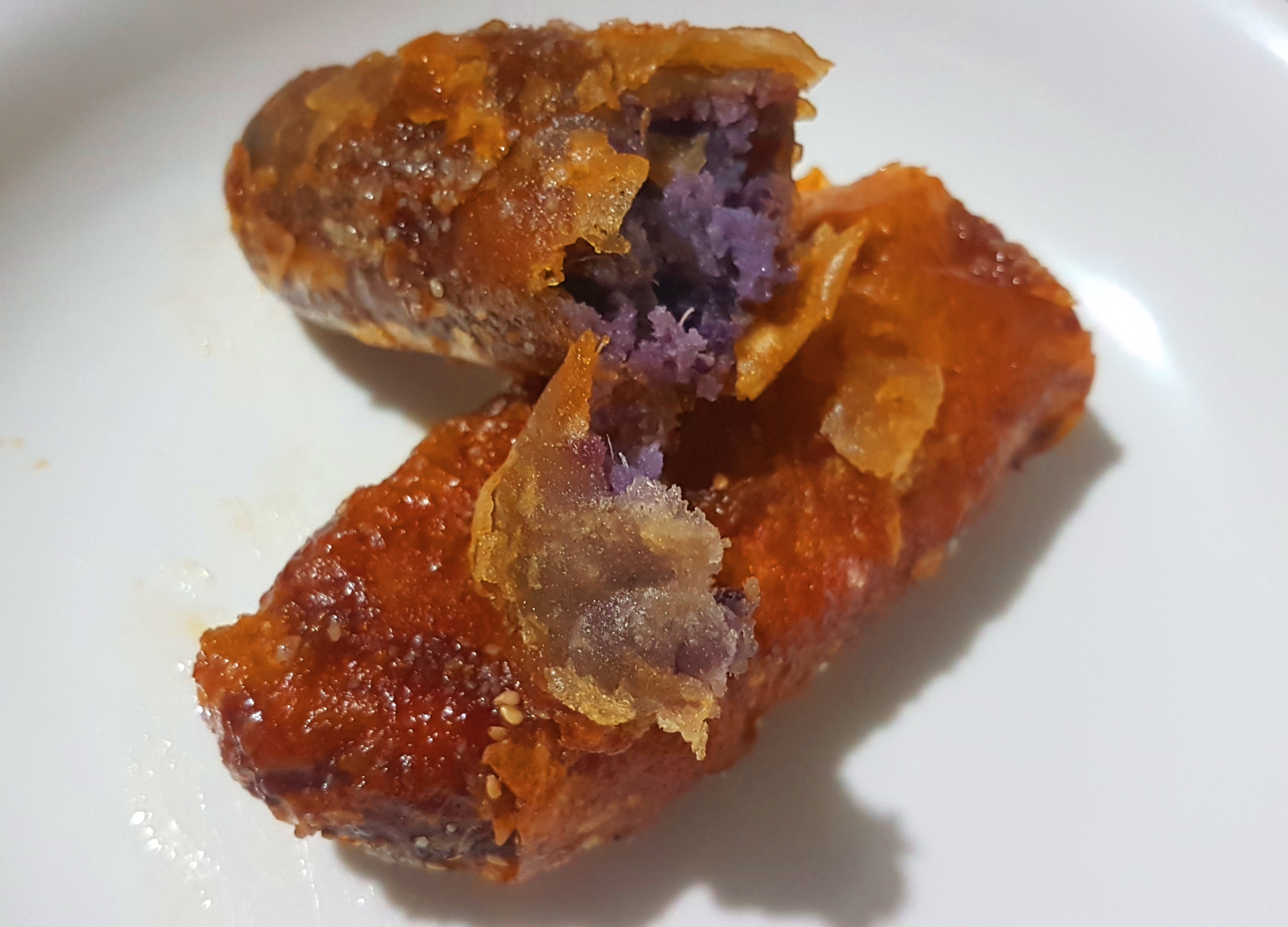
Turón halayá made with mashed ube (purple yam)

Filipino lumpia also have a unique and extremely popular dessert subcategory, the turón. These lumpia variants are either cooked with a glazing of caramelized sugar, sprinkled with granular sugar, or drizzled in latík (coconut caramel), a syrup, or honey. Turón are traditionally filled with ripe saba bananas and jackfruit, but they can also be made with a wide variety of other sweet fillings, from sweet potato to ube.

=== Daral ===
Another dessert lumpia, Daral (called Balolon among the Maranao) originates from the Tausūg people in Mindanao. The wrapper is made from unsweetened, ground glutinous rice and coconut milk (galapóng), and is filled with sweetened coconut meat (hinti).

=== Dinamita ===
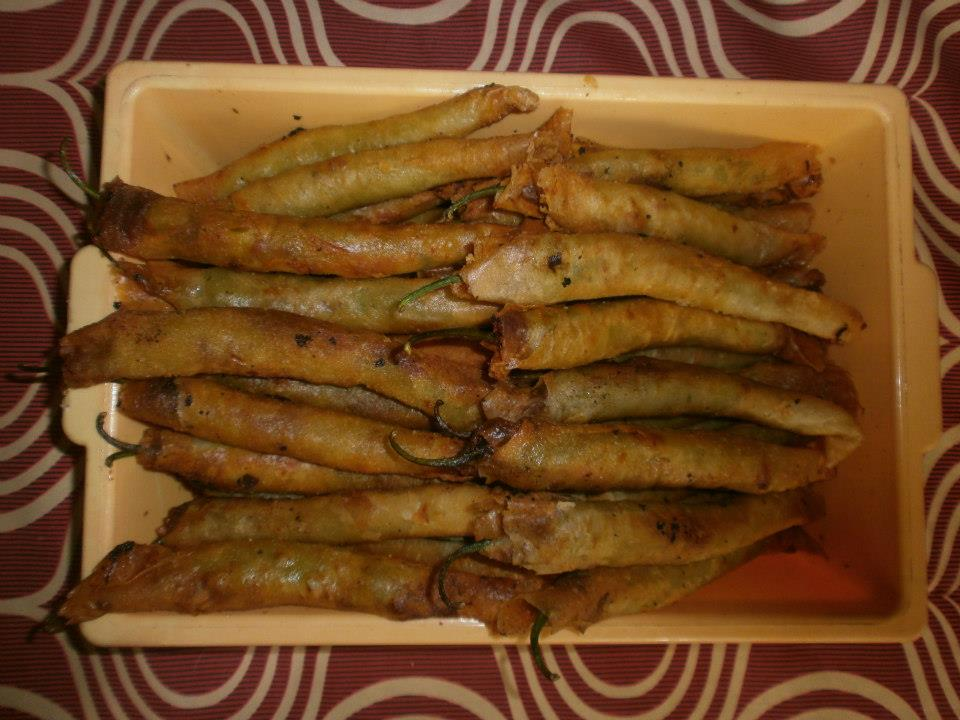
Dinamita stuffed with a whole siling haba (long chili pepper)

Dinamita or "dynamite lumpia" is a deep-fried variant stuffed with a whole chili pepper wrapped in a thin egg crêpe. The stuffing is usually giniling (ground beef or pork), cheese, and spices, but it can also be adapted to use a wide variety of other ingredients, including tocino, hamón, bacon, and shredded chicken. It is commonly eaten as an appetizer or as a companion to beer.

=== Lumpiang adobo ===
A type of lumpia filled with shredded meat that has been cooked adobo style.

=== Lumpiang gulay ===
Lumpiang gulay ("vegetable spring roll") usually consists of various chopped vegetables and a small amount of pork or shrimp. The types of vegetables can vary greatly, and is a fried version. It is not vegetarian by default, but vegan and vegetarian versions can be made from the basic recipe.

=== Lumpiang hubád ===
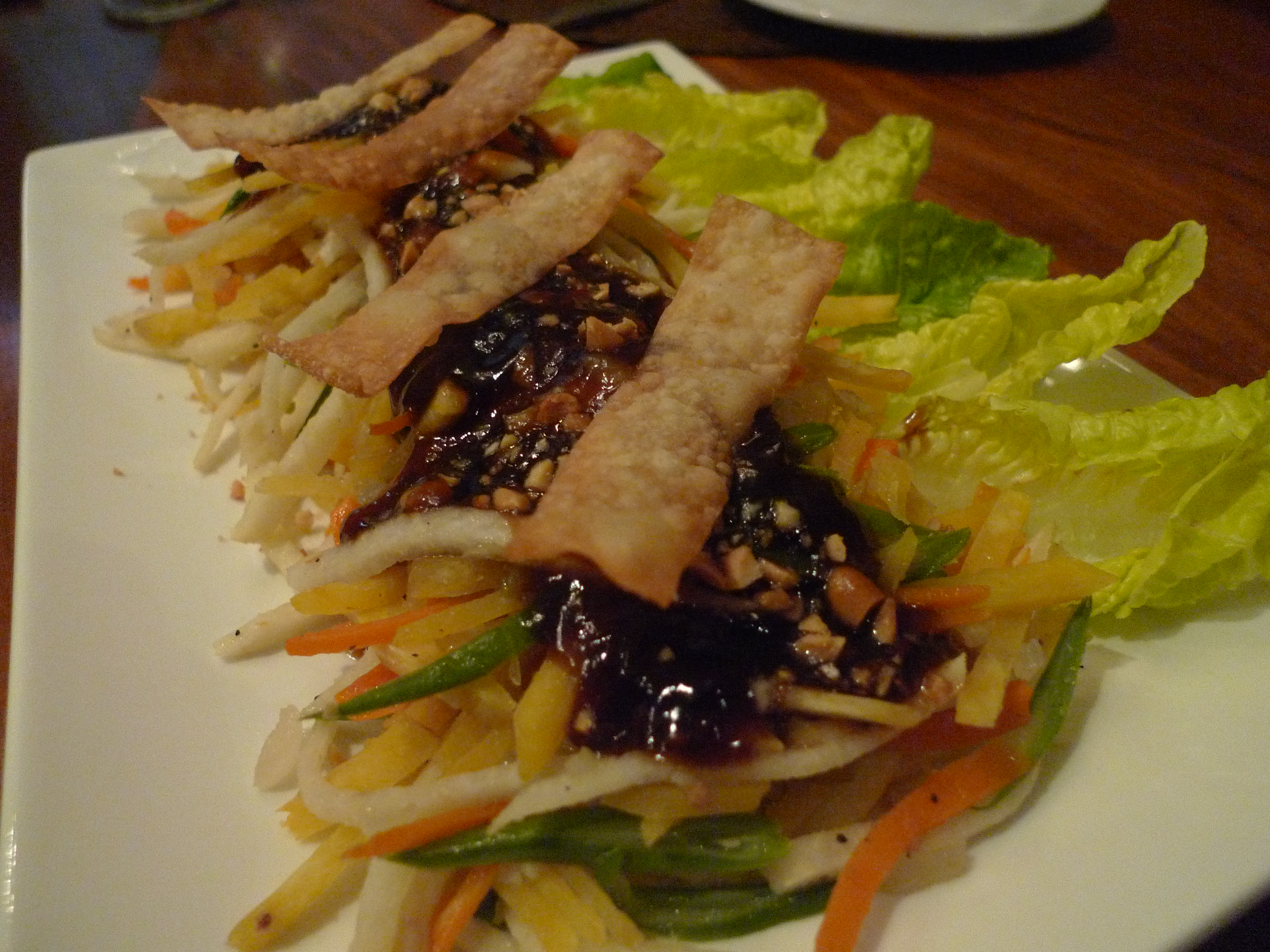
Lumpiang hubád, a salad made of the fillings of fresh lumpia

Lumpiang hubád ("naked spring roll") is lumpiang saríwâ (see below, lit. "fresh lumpia") served without the crêpe wrapping. The lack of a wrapper technically does not make the dish a lumpia, but presents an alternative way of serving fresh lumpia's traditional fillings.

=== Lumpiang isdâ ===
Lumpiang isdâ ("fish lumpia") is filled primarily with fish flakes and fried. It is also known as lumpiang galunggóng (blackfin scad), lumpiang bangús (milkfish), lumpiang tulingán (yellowfin tuna), etc., depending on the type of fish used. A common version of this combines fish flakes with malunggay (moringa) leaves.

=== Lumpiang keso ===
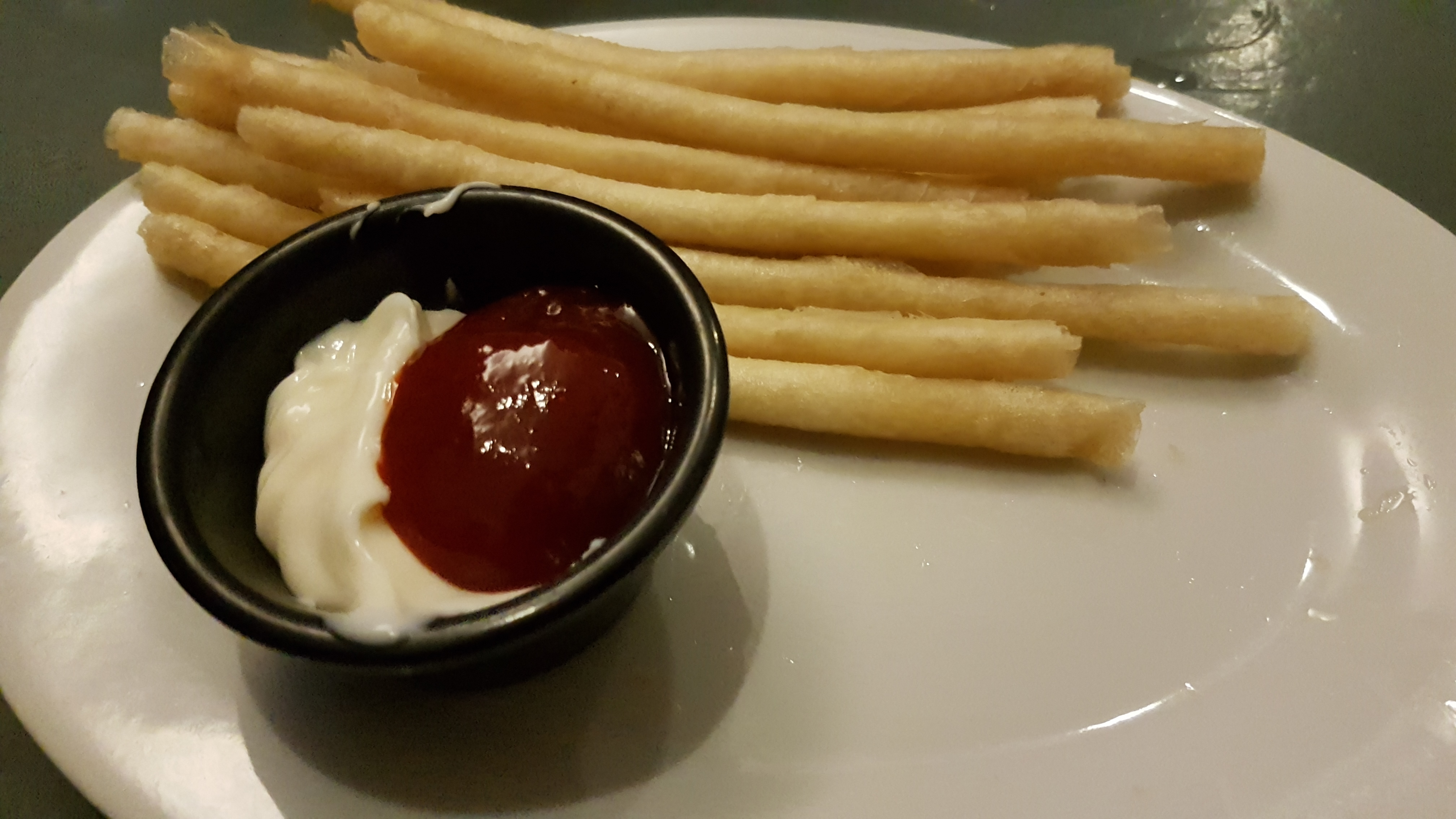
Lumpiang keso, a lumpia appetizer filled with cheese and served with mayonnaise and banana ketchup

Lumpiang keso, more commonly known as "cheese lumpia" or "cheese sticks", is deep-fried lumpia with a slice of cheese (often cheddar) as filling. It is usually served with a dipping sauce made of banana ketchup and mayonnaise.

=== Lumpiang labong ===
Lumpiang labóng is similar to lumpiang ubód but is made with labóng (bamboo shoot), rather than heart of palm, making it more like the Indonesian lumpia rebung. It can be eaten fresh or fried.

=== Lumpiang prito ===
Lumpiang prito ("fried spring roll"), is the generic name for a subclass of lumpia that is fried. It usually refers to lumpiang gulay or lumpiang togue. They can come in sizes as small as lumpiang shanghai or as big as lumpiang sariwà. It is usually eaten with vinegar and chili peppers, or a mixture of soy sauce and calamansi juice known as toyomansî.

=== Lumpiang saríwâ ===
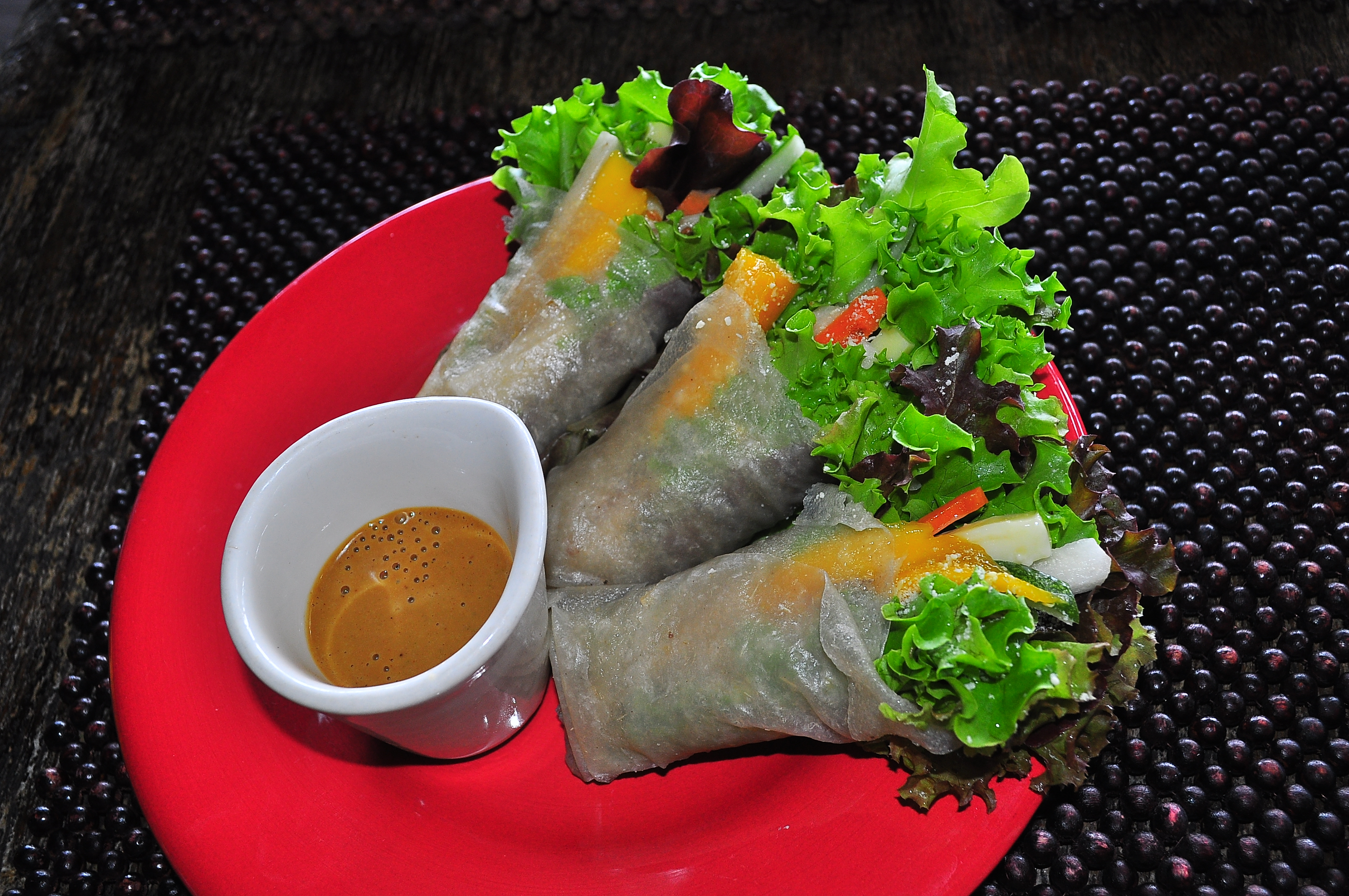
lumpiang sariwà (fresh lumpia) with peanut sauce

Lumpiang sariwà (Tagalog: "fresh spring roll"), or "fresh lumpia", consists of minced vegetables or various pre-cooked meat or seafood, and jicama (singkamás) as an extender, encased in a double wrapping of lettuce leaf and a yellowish egg crêpe. An egg is often used as a binding agent for the wrap. The accompanying sauce is made from chicken or pork stock, a starch mixture, crushed and roasted peanuts, and fresh garlic. This variety is not fried and is usually around five centimeters in diameter and 15 centimeters in length. It is derived from the original Chinese popiah.

=== Lumpiang Shanghai ===
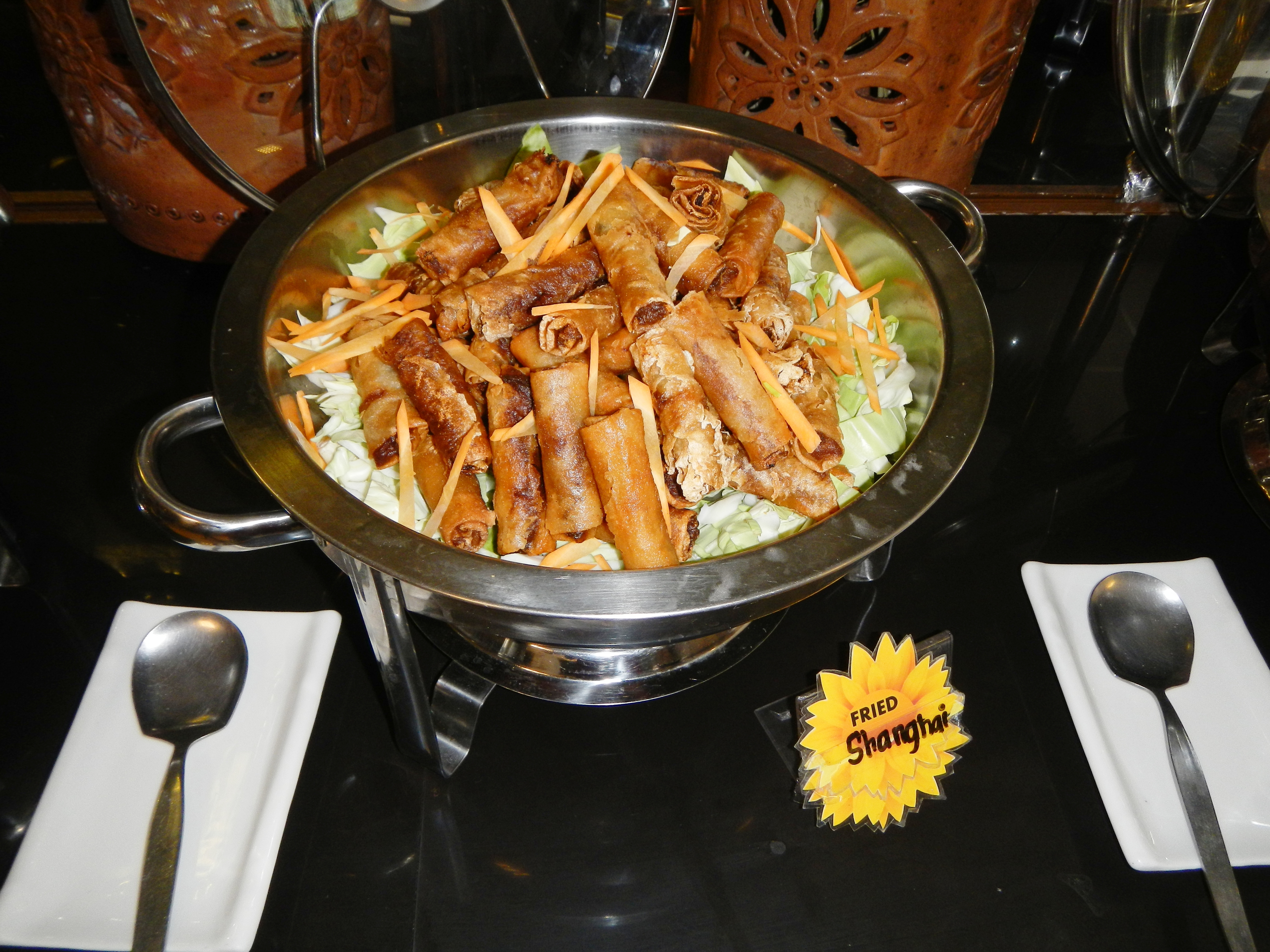
Lumpiang Shanghai at a buffet

Lumpiang Shanghai is regarded as the most widespread type of lumpia and the most commonly served in Filipino gatherings. It is characteristically filled with sautéed ground pork, minced onion, carrots, and spices, with the mixture sometimes held together by beaten egg. It has numerous variants that contain other ingredients like green peas, kintsáy (Chinese parsley) or raisins. Lumpiang Shanghai is commonly served with agre dulce, but ketchup (tomato or banana) and vinegar are popular alternatives. This variant is typically smaller than other lumpia. Despite the name, it did not originate from Shanghai or China.

=== Lumpiang singkamás ===
Lumpiang singkamás is similar to lumpiang ubod, but it is made primarily with julienned strips of jicama rather than heart of palm. It can be eaten fresh or fried.

=== Lumpiang togue ===
This version of lumpiang gulay is filled primarily with bean sprouts (togue) and various other vegetables such as string beans and carrots. Small morsels of meat, seafood, or tofu may be added. Though it is the least expensive of the variants, the preparation the cutting of vegetables and meats into small pieces and pre-cooking these can be taxing and labor-intensive. It is a fried version.

=== Lumpiang ubód ===
Lumpiang ubód is a variation made of julienned ubód (heart of the coconut tree) as the main ingredient. They can be fried or served as lumpiang sariwà. It originates from Silay, Negros Occidental, where a variant, lumpiang Silay, is still popular.

=== Lumpiang pancit ===
A type of lumpia where the filling consists of pancit, a popular Filipino noodle dish. Most likely created from the turo-turo or karinderias that have leftover pancit, often the sótanghon (mung bean noodle) or bihon (rice noodle varieties, as fillers within the lumpia.

=== Ngohiong ===
Ngohiong is a variant of lumpia distinctively seasoned with five-spice powder. It is derived from the Hokkien dish ngo hiang (kikiám in the Philippines, a type of Chinese sausage) and originated in Cebu City.

=== Turón ===
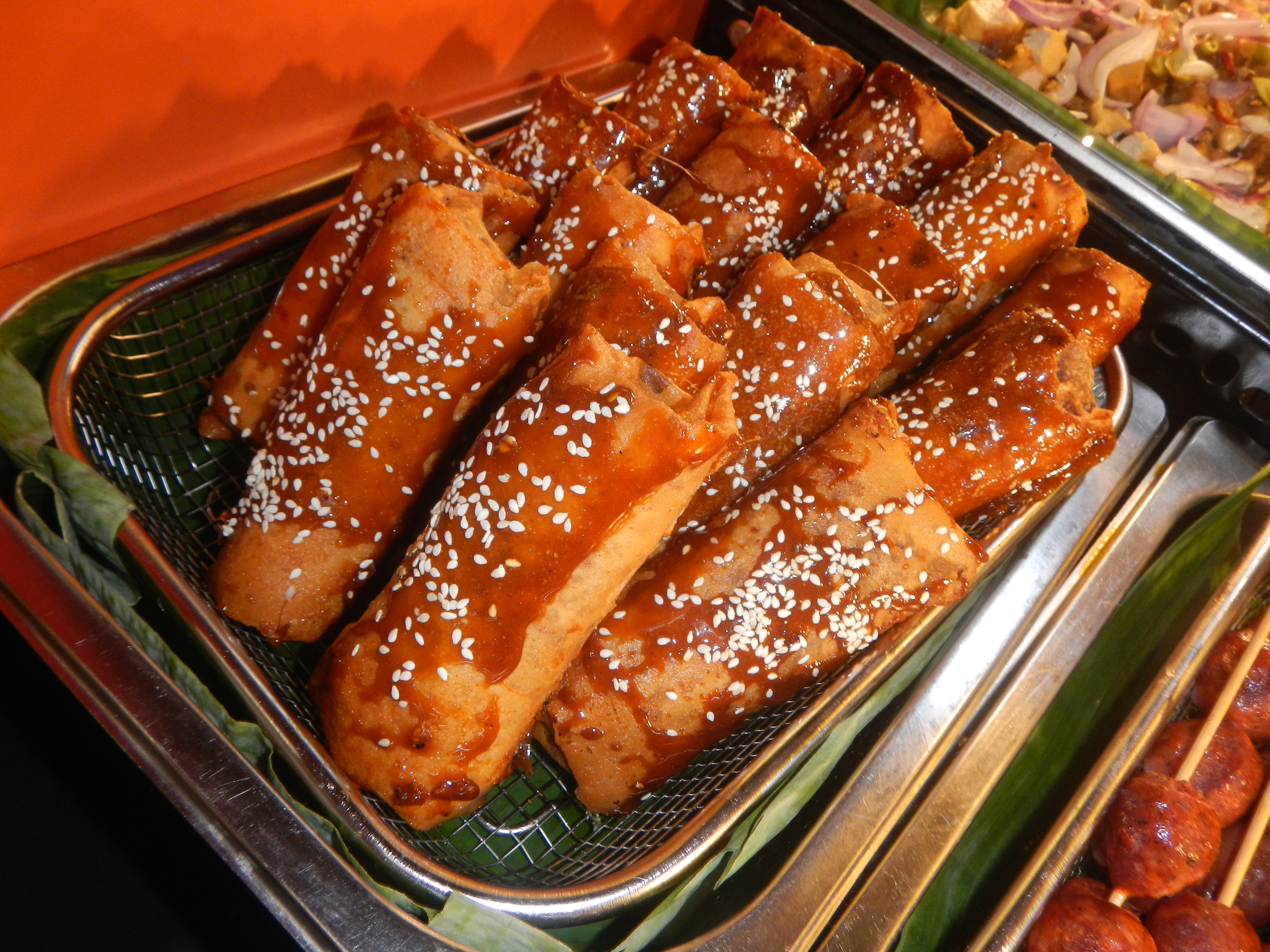
Turón, a dessert lumpia with saba bananas

Turón, also known as lumpiang saging, banana lumpia, or banana rolls, is a golden-brown snack that is usually made of sliced saba bananas and jackfruit or cheese in a lumpia wrapper, sprinkled with brown sugar, and deep-fried. It is sometimes paired with ice cream or pancake syrup. This snack is sold in the streets of most cities in the country alongside maruya, banana cue, and camote cue. Different variants have emerged using different ingredients: such as manggáng turón (mango), kamote turon (sweet potato), turón de maní (peanut), chocolate turón, and ube turon or turón halayá (mashed purple yam).

== The Netherlands ==
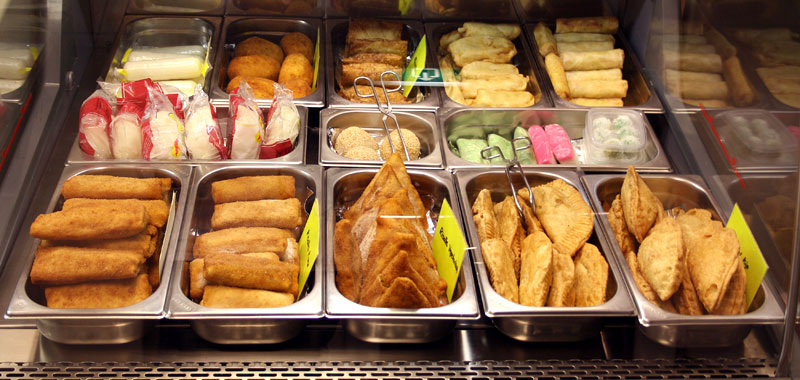
Indo loempia as part of assorted gorengan fritter snacks, sold in a toko Asian shop in Amsterdam

In the Netherlands, lumpia is called loempia, an old Indonesian spelling. It was introduced to the Netherlands through its former colonization of Indonesia. In the Netherlands, loempia is described as a large Indonesian version of Chinese spring rolls, stuffed with minced meat, bean sprouts, and cabbage leaves, and flavored with soy sauce, garlic, and green onion. Loempia is one of the popular snacks sold in the Dutch snack bars or eetcafé.

== Lumpia wrapper ==
=== Philippines ===
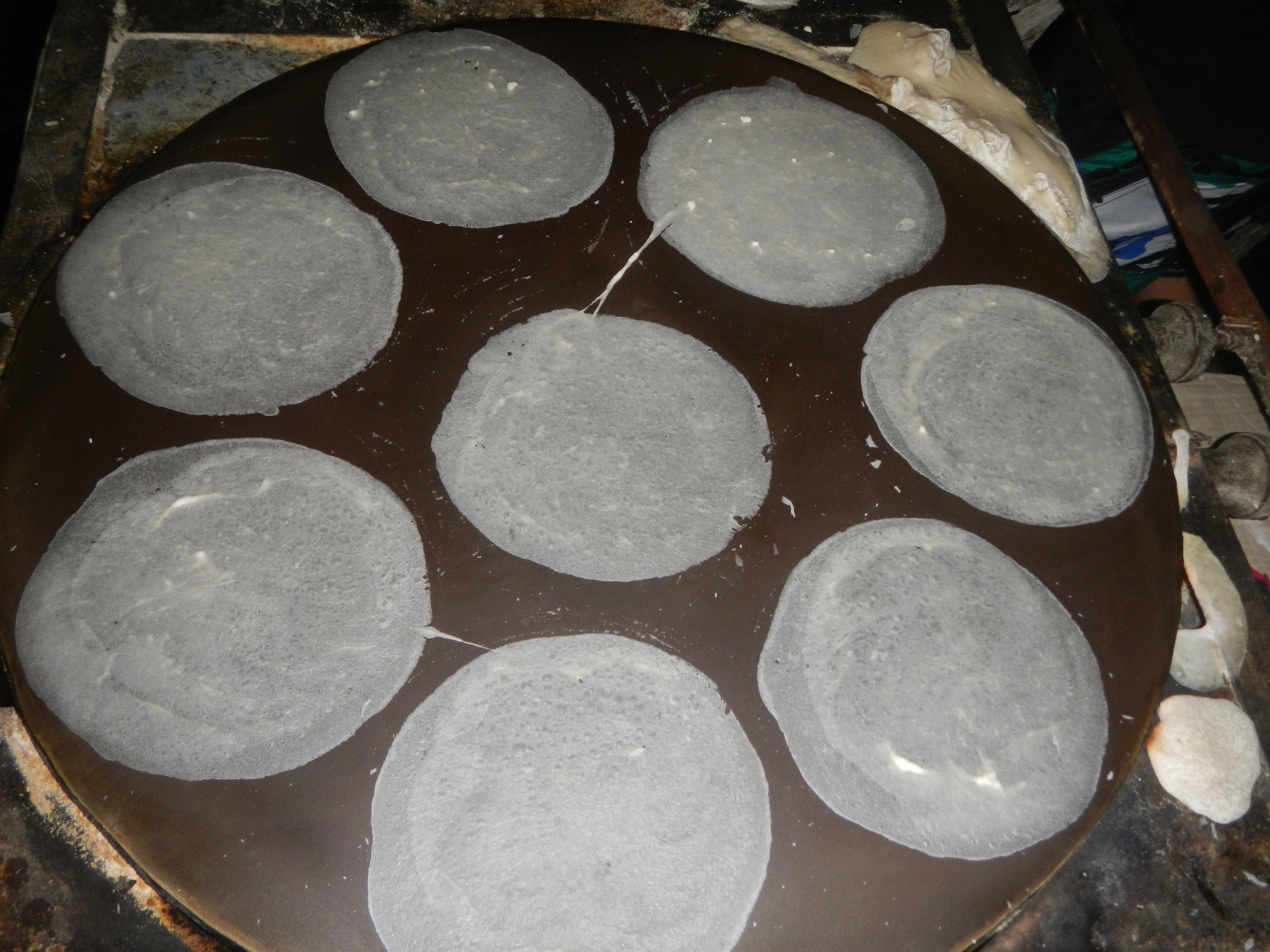
Filipino lumpia wrappers being fried on a heated plate

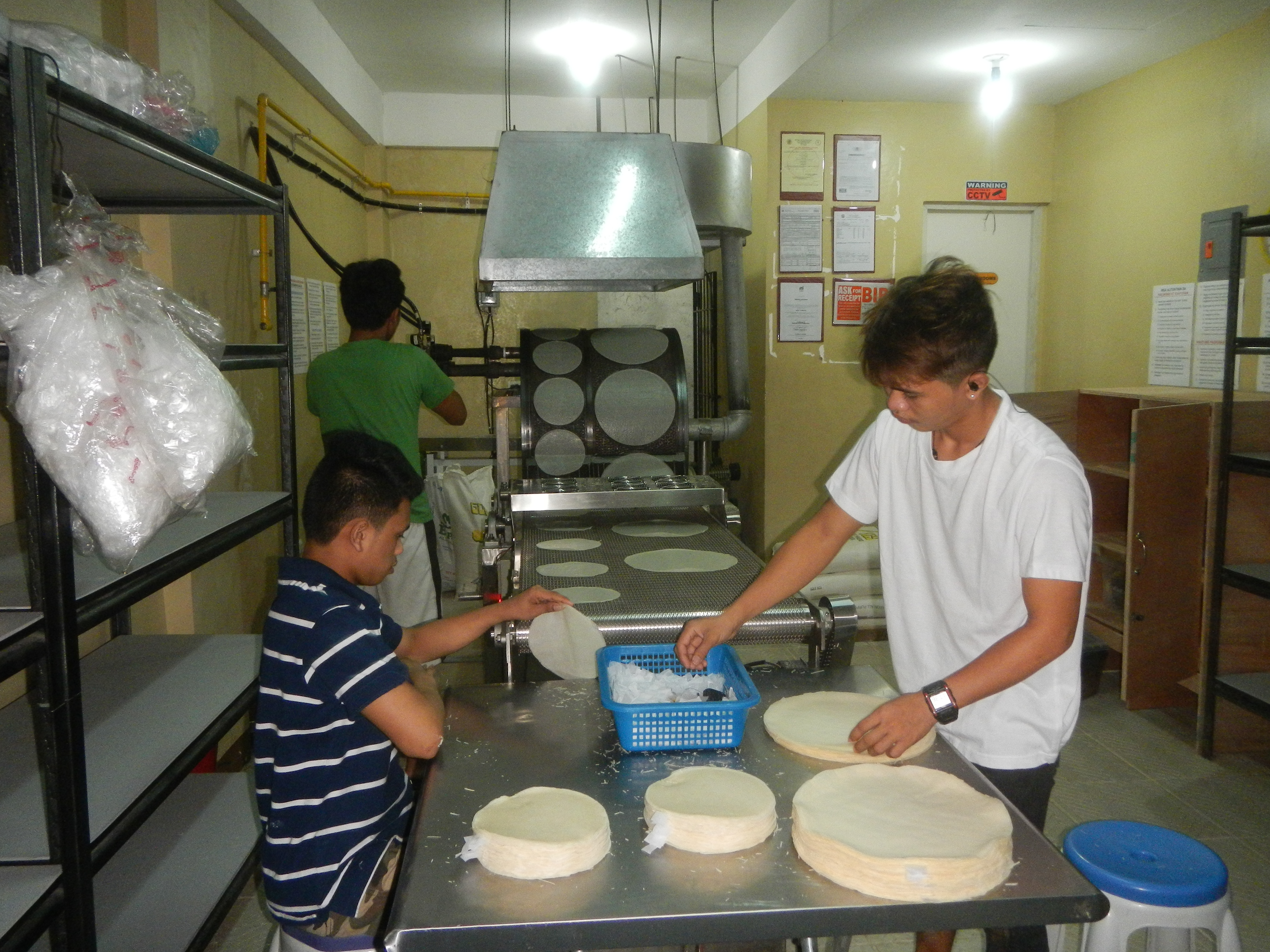
Filipino lumpia wrappers being made with modern machinery

Filipino lumpia wrappers generally come in two variants. The most common variant used mostly for fried lumpia is made from just flour, water, salt, and optionally cornstarch. This type of wrapper is characteristically paper-thin, much thinner than other spring roll wrappers. The ingredients are mixed into a wet dough, then left to sit for a few hours before cooking. A ball of dough is taken with one hand and smeared into a heated large flat metal plate greased with oil until a very thin circular film of it adheres to the pan and fries. It is cooked for a few seconds then quickly taken out and left to dry.

For "fresh" (non-fried) lumpia, the wrappers are usually made with egg in addition to the other basic ingredients (and it may use rice flour). This essentially turns it into a thin egg crêpe. It is still thinner than other spring roll variants, but much thicker and softer than variants made from just flour and water.

In modern mass production, Filipino lumpia wrappers are generally made by automated assembly-line machines similar to those used to make spring roll wrappers, differing only in the recipe and the thickness of the wrapper. It uses a revolving drum.

Vegan versions of the wrapper exclude eggs, and is instead just made with flour, salt, and water, which results in a thinner translucent wrap. These are also sealed with water, not an egg wash.

== Popularity ==
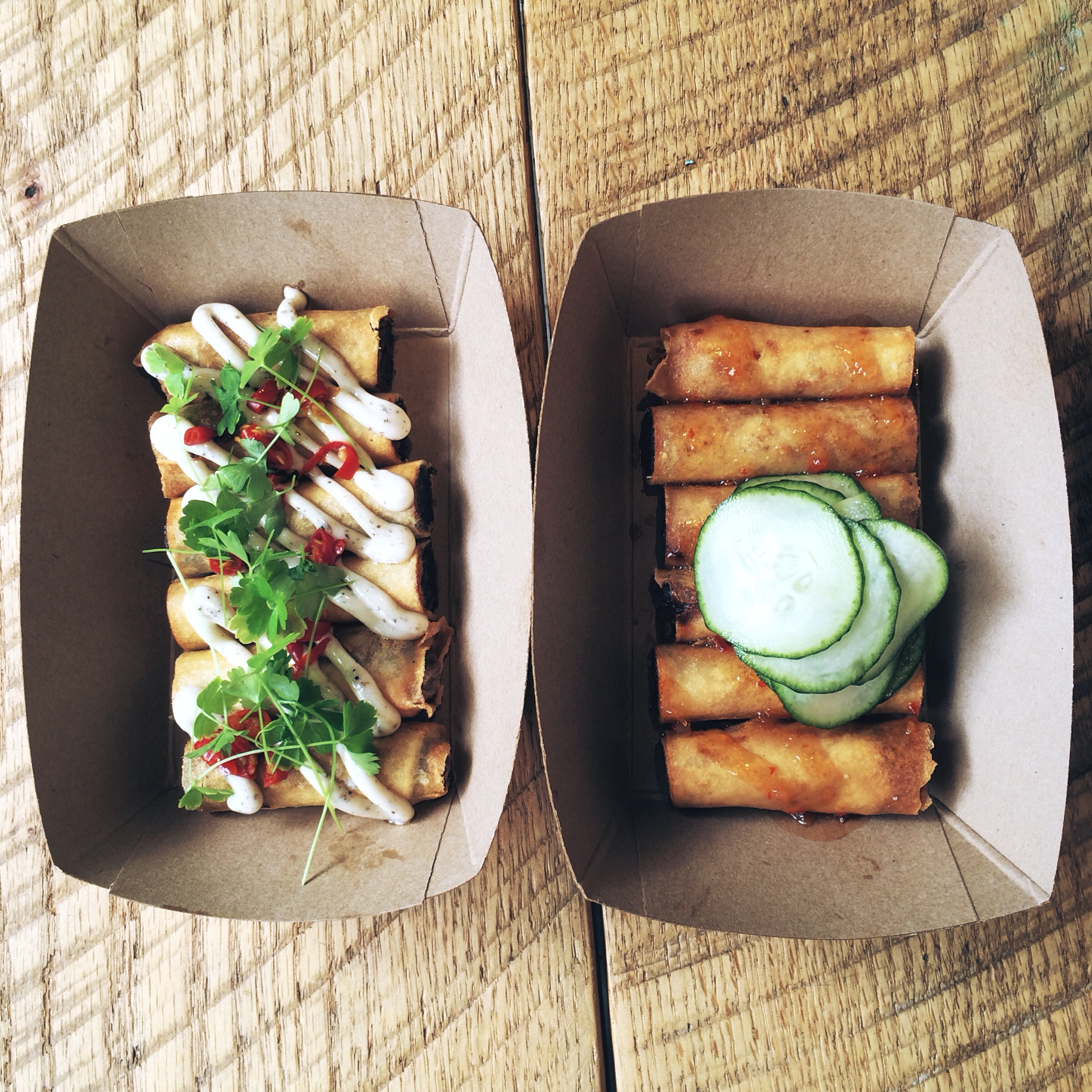
Filipino-inspired lumpia from Lumpia Shack in New York City

Lumpia have such enduring popularity that one can see at least one variant in almost any set of Filipino or Indonesian festivities. Despite being an adaptation of a Chinese dish, in the United States, lumpia is associated with Filipino cuisine, while in Europe, especially in the Netherlands, it is associated with Indonesian cuisine, owed to their shared colonial links. The distinct taste and ease of preparation (the Shanghai variant at least) have caused lumpia to be one of the staple food products on the menus of many Filipino restaurants in the United States and around the world.

== See also ==
- Popiah
- Bakpia (Hopia)
- Crepe
- Egg roll
- Spring roll
- Turon
- Daral
- Gỏi cuốn
- Chả giò
- Javanese cuisine
- Chinese Indonesian cuisine
- Filipino Chinese cuisine
- List of stuffed dishes
