= Lumpiang keso =

Filipino deep-fried crêpe-wrapped cheese

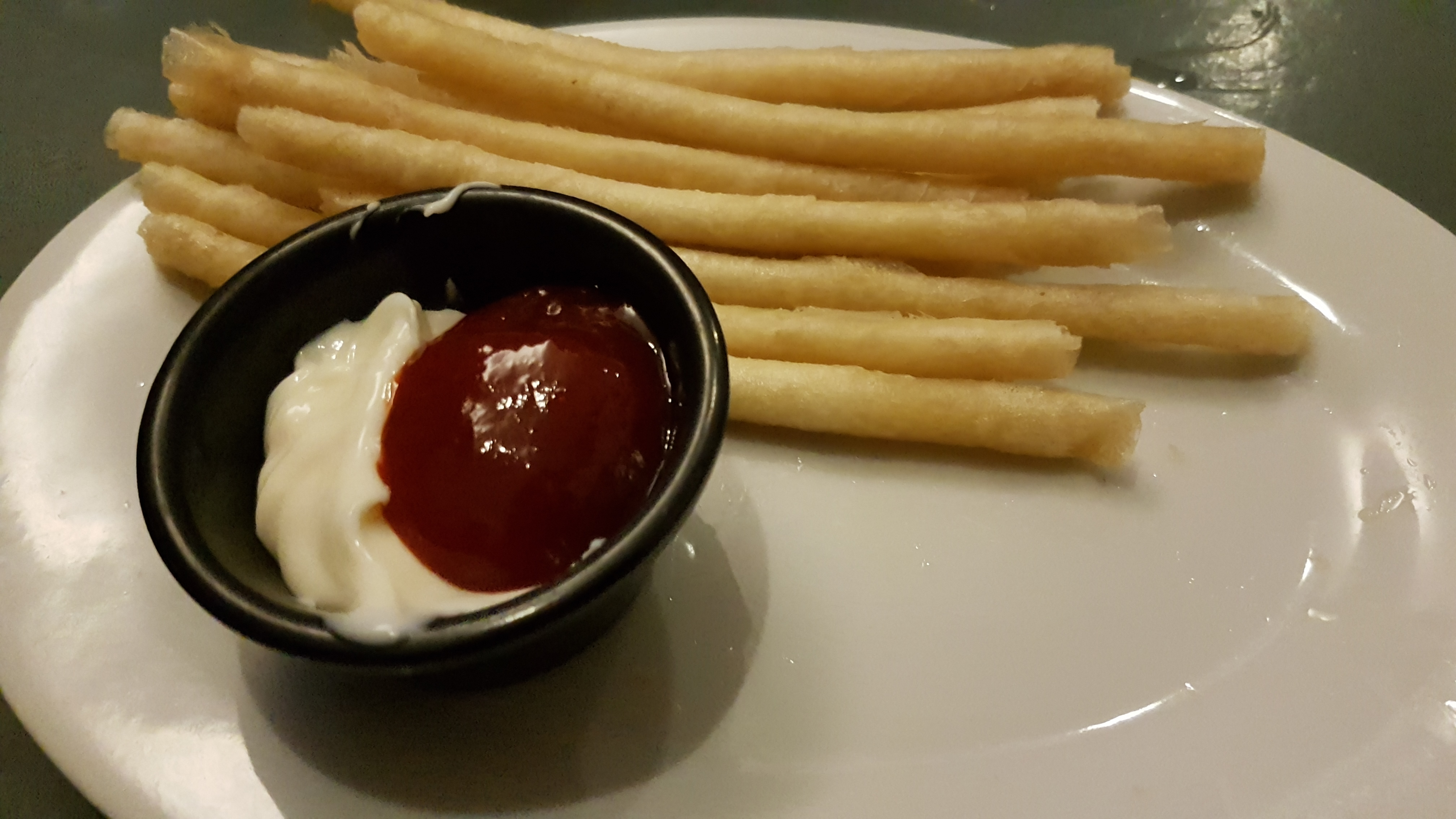
- Alternative names: Cheese sticks, cheese lumpia, cheese turon, lumpiang queso, keso lumpia, keso turon
- Course: Appetizer
- Place of origin: Philippines
- Serving temperature: Hot, warm
- Main ingredients: Cheese, lumpia wrapper
- Variations: Lumpiang may keso

Lumpiang keso is a Filipino deep-fried appetizer consisting of a stick of cheese wrapped in a thin egg crêpe. It is more commonly known as cheese sticks, cheese lumpia, or cheese turon. It is usually served warm and crispy, with a dipping sauce made from a mixture of banana ketchup and mayonnaise. It can also be served with garlic mayonnaise or sweet chili sauce.

The recipe merely involves rolling a large stick of cheese (usually processed cheese or cheddar) in a thin lumpia wrapper. They are cooked quickly, usually less than 2 minutes. Ideally, the cheese or the entire lumpia is chilled or even frozen before cooking as this prevents the cheese from melting completely upon frying. Alternatively, the lumpia wrapper can be rolled tightly to prevent the cheese from leaking out. The thickness of the roll varies from very thin and long, to thick and stubby. It is optionally sprinkled with cheese powder.

Lumpiang keso is a type of lumpia. The dish is easy to modify, and variants may use other types of cheese like cream cheese or add milk to moisten the cheese. Other types of lumpia may also use cheese, like dinamita and lumpiang Shanghai, but these are considered separate dishes altogether. Lumpiang keso is popular among children. It is also commonly served as finger food with beer or other alcoholic drinks.

== See also ==
- Tequeño
- Dinamita
- Sigara böreği
- Lumpiang Shanghai
- Siopao
- Mozzarella sticks
- Sorullos
- Turon
