= Lumpiang ubod =

Filipino appetizer

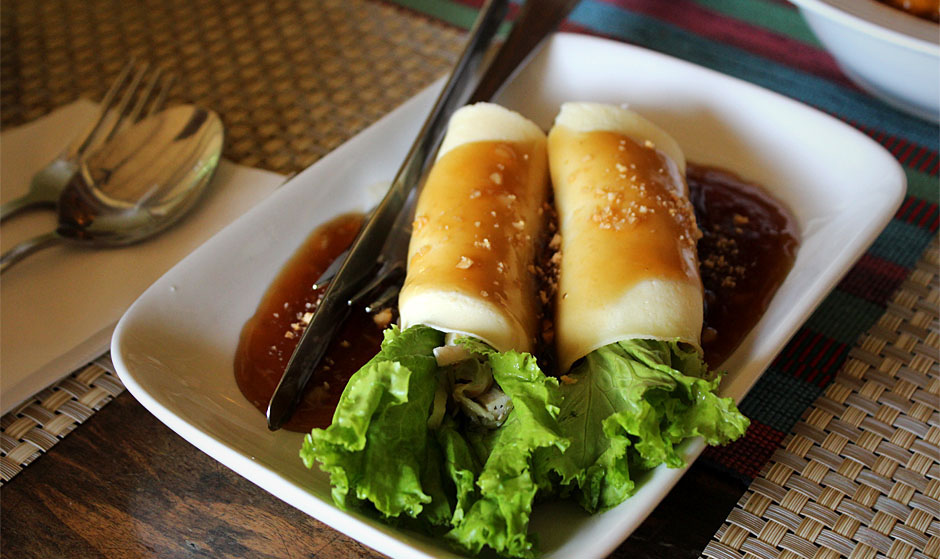
- Alternative names: Heart of palm spring rolls, coconut pith spring roll, palm spring rolls
- Course: Appetizer
- Place of origin: Philippines
- Region or state: Silay, Negros Occidental
- Serving temperature: Hot, warm
- Main ingredients: Heart of palm, lumpia wrapper
- Variations: Lumpiang Silay

Lumpiang ubod, also known as heart of palm spring rolls, is a Filipino appetizer consisting of julienned ubod (heart of palm) with various meat and vegetables in a thin egg crêpe. It is commonly served fresh (as lumpiang sariwa), but it can also be deep-fried. It originates from the city of Silay in Negros Occidental where an original variant, lumpiang Silay, is still popular.

== Names and origin ==
Lumpiang ubod derives its name from ubod ("heart of palm") which is the edible pith derived from coconut trunks. The dish originates from the city of Silay in the province of Negros Occidental, Negros Island in the Visayas. Purportedly it emerged as one of the appetizers carried on woven trays (bilao) by servers (manuglibod) in mahjong gambling dens frequented by the city's large affluent class. The ubod was taken from freshly felled coconut trees that are also used widely in Ilonggo cuisine. It became popular and was adopted in other parts of the Philippines, eventually taking on the characteristics of the more prevalent lumpiang sariwa.

== Description ==
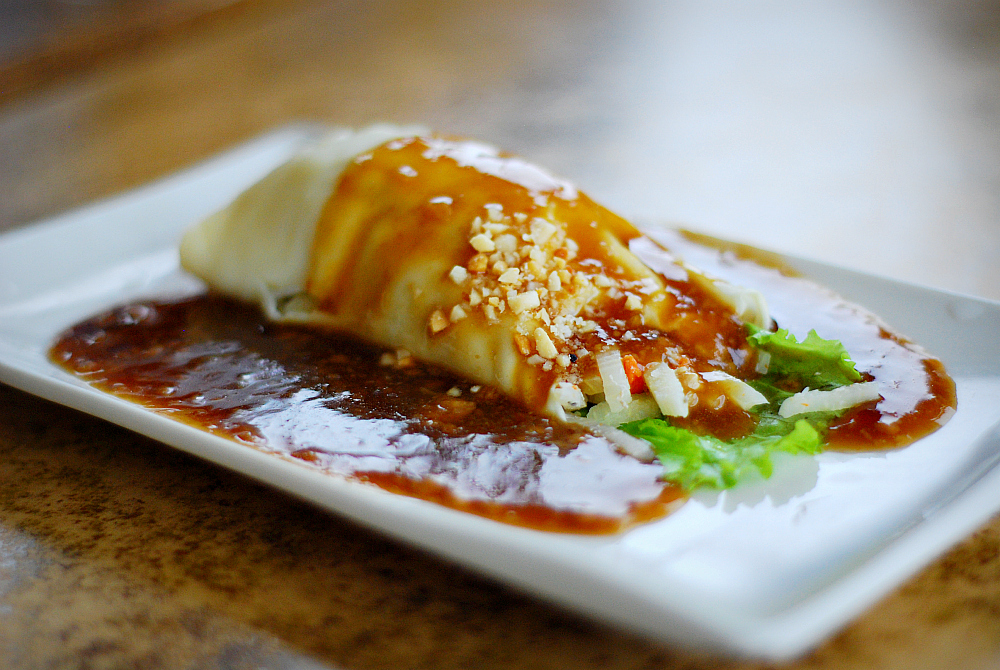
Lumpiang ubod served fresh with peanut sauce

Modern lumpiang ubod is most commonly served as lumpiang sariwa (fresh lumpia). It is made by julienning heart of palm and carrots into thin strips. It is mixed together with minced garlic, onion and various other vegetables if desired, including cabbage, green beans, singkamas (jicama), potatoes, and so on. Meat (pork, beef, or chicken), shrimp, or tofu can also be added. These are sautéed with spices and patis (fish sauce) until the ubod is soft and the meat is thoroughly cooked.

The lumpia wrapper can be homemade or commercial. It is the thicker variant used for lumpiang sariwa, and not the thin version commonly used in fried versions. It is made by mixing egg, flour, and water into a thin batter. It is poured into a thin pancake on a pan for more or less a minute and then taken out to dry. A small amount of the pre-cooked filling is then laid on a bed of lettuce and wrapped with the lumpia wrapper. It is served drizzled with peanut sauce and garnished with green onions, crushed unsalted peanuts, toasted garlic, and/or crushed chicharon.

Lumpiang ubod can also be served as lumpiang prito (fried lumpia). The preparation is more or less the same, though the type of lumpia wrapper used is less important. It is deep-fried and then served with a dipping sauce of choice, like other fried lumpia.

=== Lumpiang Silay ===
The original Silay lumpiang ubod is sometimes differentiated as lumpiang Silay, lumpiang Ilonggo, lumpiang ubod de Silay, or lumpiang Bacolod. Unlike the versions in other islands, it is always made fresh. It is originally smaller and thinner in comparison (approximately finger-sized). It traditionally included ubod, sautéed meat (ground or cut into strips) and shrimp, an entire sprig of green onion, and crushed chicharon in a bed of lettuce. The lumpia wrapper is also traditionally made with rice flour. It is not served with a dipping sauce or drizzled with peanut sauce like most modern lumpiang ubod. Rather the sauce is spread inside the wrapper before rolling. The sauce is traditionally made from cornstarch, salt, sugar, soy sauce, and finely crushed toasted garlic. It is typically served with wax paper covering, a legacy of its origin as finger food rather than a dish served on a plate.

== See also ==
- Dinamita
- Lumpiang Shanghai
- Siopao
