= Dinamita =

Filipino fried crêpe-wrapped pepper dish

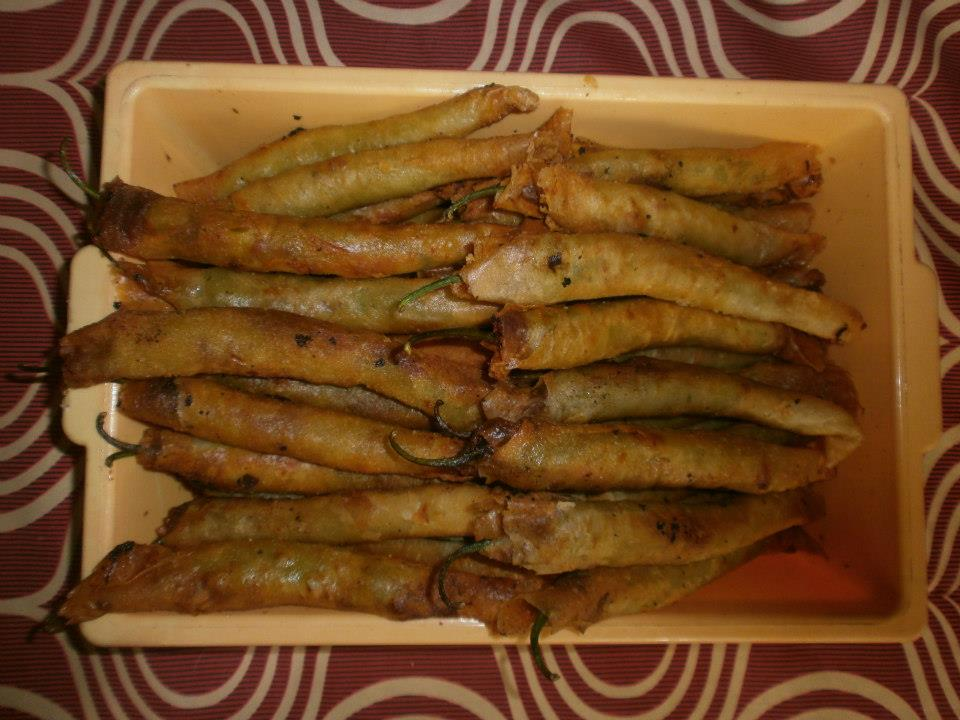
- Alternative names: Lumpiang dinamita dynamite lumpia dynamite spring rolls lumpiang sili barako finger chili cheese sticks
- Course: Appetizer
- Place of origin: Philippines
- Serving temperature: Hot, warm

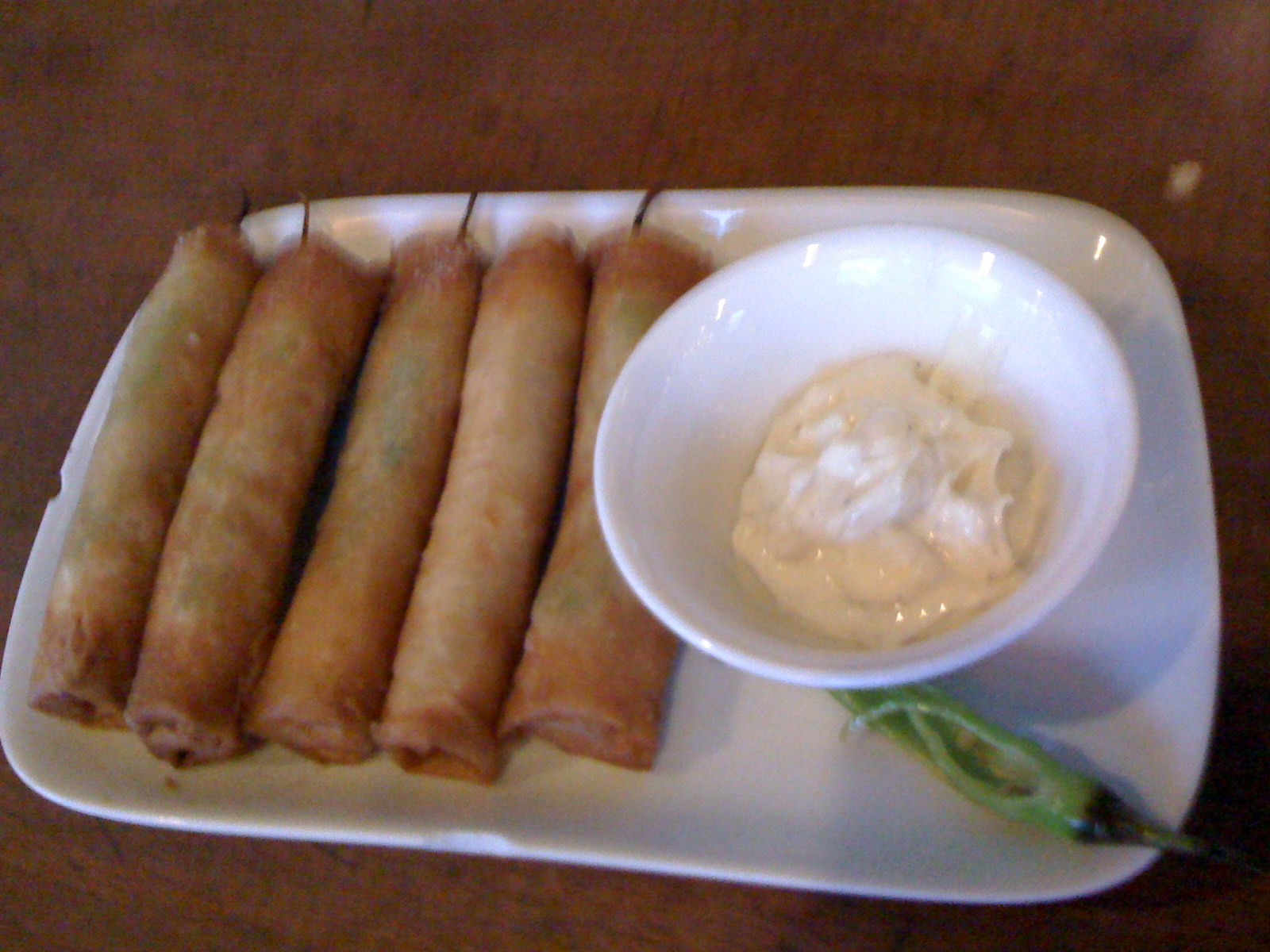
Dinamita with garlic mayonnaise

Dinamita, also known as dynamite lumpia or simply dynamite, is a Filipino deep-fried appetizer made of long green chili peppers (siling haba) stuffed with various fillings and wrapped in a thin spring-roll wrapper. It is a variant of lumpia, a traditional Filipino spring roll.

== Names ==
The name literally means 'dynamite', due to each roll's resemblance to a stick of dynamite with a long fuse, and refers as well to the heat of the pepper. Since it is a type of lumpia, it is also known as "dynamite lumpia", "dynamite spring rolls", and "lumpiang dinamita". It also has other creative names like "dynamite cheese sticks" (with the filling consisting of cheddar or mozzarella cheese), "barako finger", from Filipino barako (lit. 'wild boar'), which has connotations of manliness equivalent to the English term "stud".

== Description ==
Like most lumpia recipes, dinamita is very easy to prepare and can be modified readily. The stuffing, giniling (ground beef or pork), is sauteed beforehand with chopped onions and garlic, and seasoned with salt and black pepper to taste.

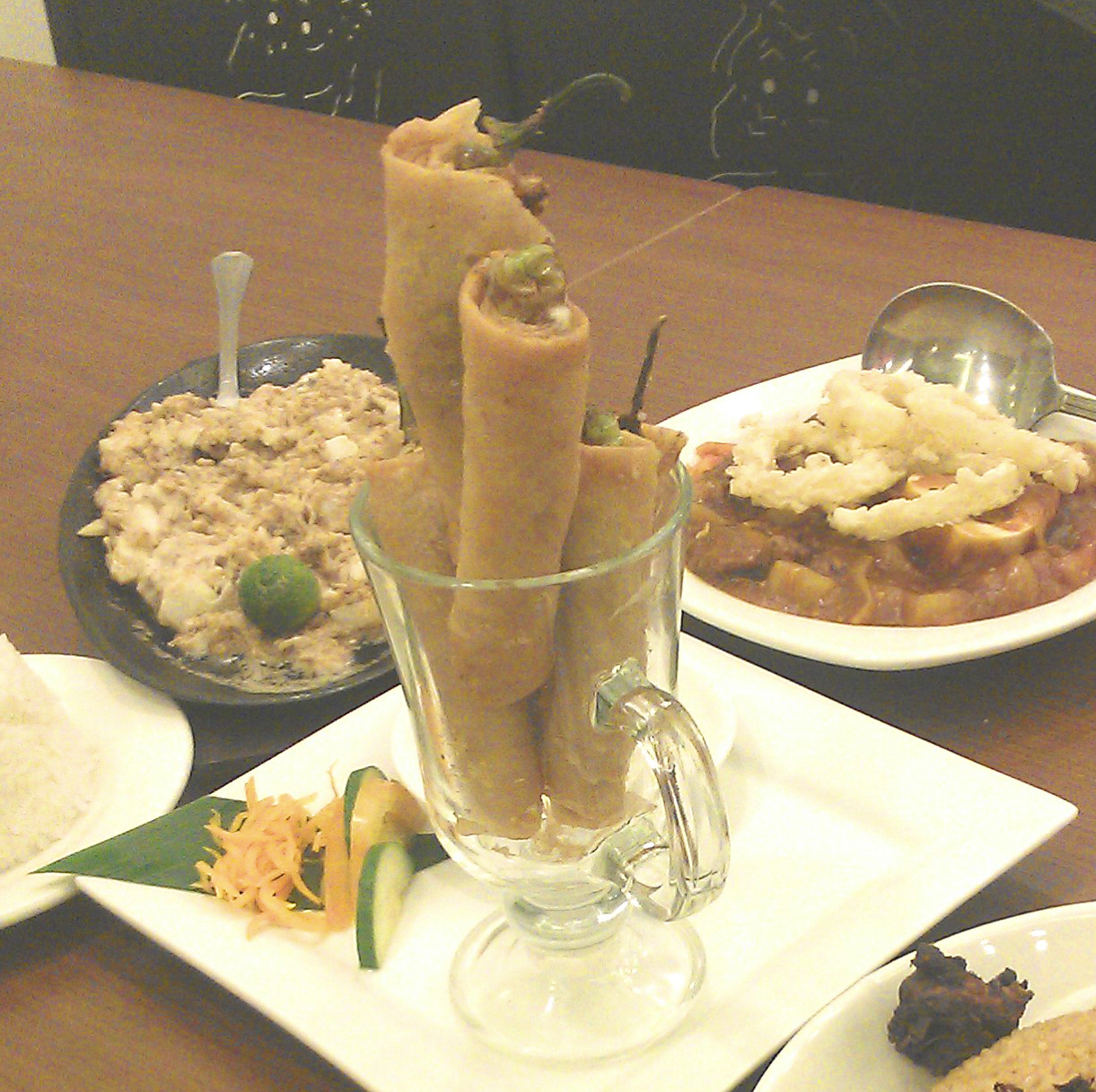
Dinamita appetizers at a restaurant

The pepper used in dinamita is the long and green siling haba pepper (also known as siling pansigang). The pepper is gently cut lengthwise and the pith and seeds removed, being careful to retain the stalk. It is then stuffed with the ground meat mixture and a strip of cheese (usually cheddar). The stuffed pepper is then wrapped in lumpia wrapper (a thin egg crêpe) with the stalk hanging out of one end. It is deep-fried until golden brown and served while still crispy.

It is eaten as is or dipped into common lumpia dipping sauces like banana ketchup, sweet and sour sauce, garlic mayonnaise, honey mustard, or vinegar with labuyo peppers and calamansi. It is usually eaten as an appetizer or as pulutan (finger food) with beer or other alcoholic drinks.

== Variations ==
Siling haba has a "hot" rating in the Scoville scale, at 50,000 SHU. However, some or most of the heat is neutralized by the cheese and the fact that the seeds are removed. The heat can be adjusted by using another type of pepper. Jalapeño or serrano peppers, for example, will lower the spiciness, while habanero peppers will increase it. Another method is to mix the stuffing with finely chopped native labuyo peppers, which are much hotter than siling haba, with a Scoville rating of 80,000 to 100,000 SHU. Some of the seeds of the siling haba can also be retained to make it hotter, though too many can make it taste bitter.

The stuffing can similarly be adjusted to taste. Some variants of dinamita may further encase or stuff the pepper with tocino, ham, or bacon, for example, before rolling it into the lumpia wrapper. Others may exclude the cheese or use shredded chicken or canned tuna. Other ingredients can also be added, like carrots or kintsay (Chinese celery). Some prepare their lumpia breaded with panko breadcrumbs.

== See also ==
- Bicol express
- Chile relleno
- Jalapeño popper
- Laing
- Lumpia mercon
- Lumpiang keso
- Lumpiang Shanghai
- Lumpiang ubod
