= Lumpiang Shanghai =

Filipino deep-fried crêpe-wrapped pork

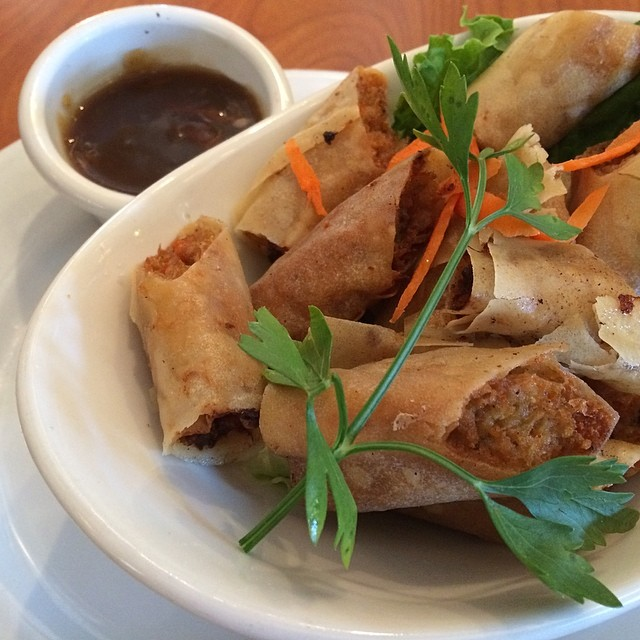
- Alternative names: Filipino spring rolls, Shanghai rolls, Shanghai lumpia, fried pork spring rolls
- Course: Appetizer
- Place of origin: Philippines
- Serving temperature: Hot, warm
- Main ingredients: Ground pork, carrots, lumpia wrapper

Lumpiang Shanghai (also known as Filipino spring rolls, or simply lumpia or lumpiya) is a Filipino deep-fried appetizer consisting of a mixture of giniling (ground pork) with vegetables like carrots, chopped scallions or red onions and garlic, wrapped in a thin egg crêpe. Lumpiang Shanghai is regarded as the most basic type of lumpia in Filipino cuisine, and it is usually smaller and thinner than other lumpia variants.

== Origin ==
The name of the wrapper is derived from Hokkien: "lun" means wet, moist, or soft, and "pia" means cake or pastry. Despite its etymology, the development of lumpiang Shanghai is not necessarily of Mainland Chinese culinary origin, but is of combined Mexican Hispanic and Filipino-Chinese culinary origin. It can be considered as part of Mexican Hispanic culinary influences in Filipino cuisine brought over from the Spanish galleon trade. It is originally a Filipino version of taquito which was called "flautas" due to its cylindrical shape before it was known to be "lumpiang Shanghai". The early version of the wrap is made of tortilla from Mexican corn flour masa. When Chinese migrants opened business in the Philippines, due to the scarcity of corn produce and the abundance of rice they introduced their own version of wrap made from rice flour in lumpia wrapper. The original length of lumpiang Shanghai is at least a ruler long but due to convenience it was cut to finger size to be convenient as a finger food. Filipino lumpia varieties, as well as the wrappers used, which are thinner in comparison to Chinese spring roll wrappers, have been nativized.

== Description ==
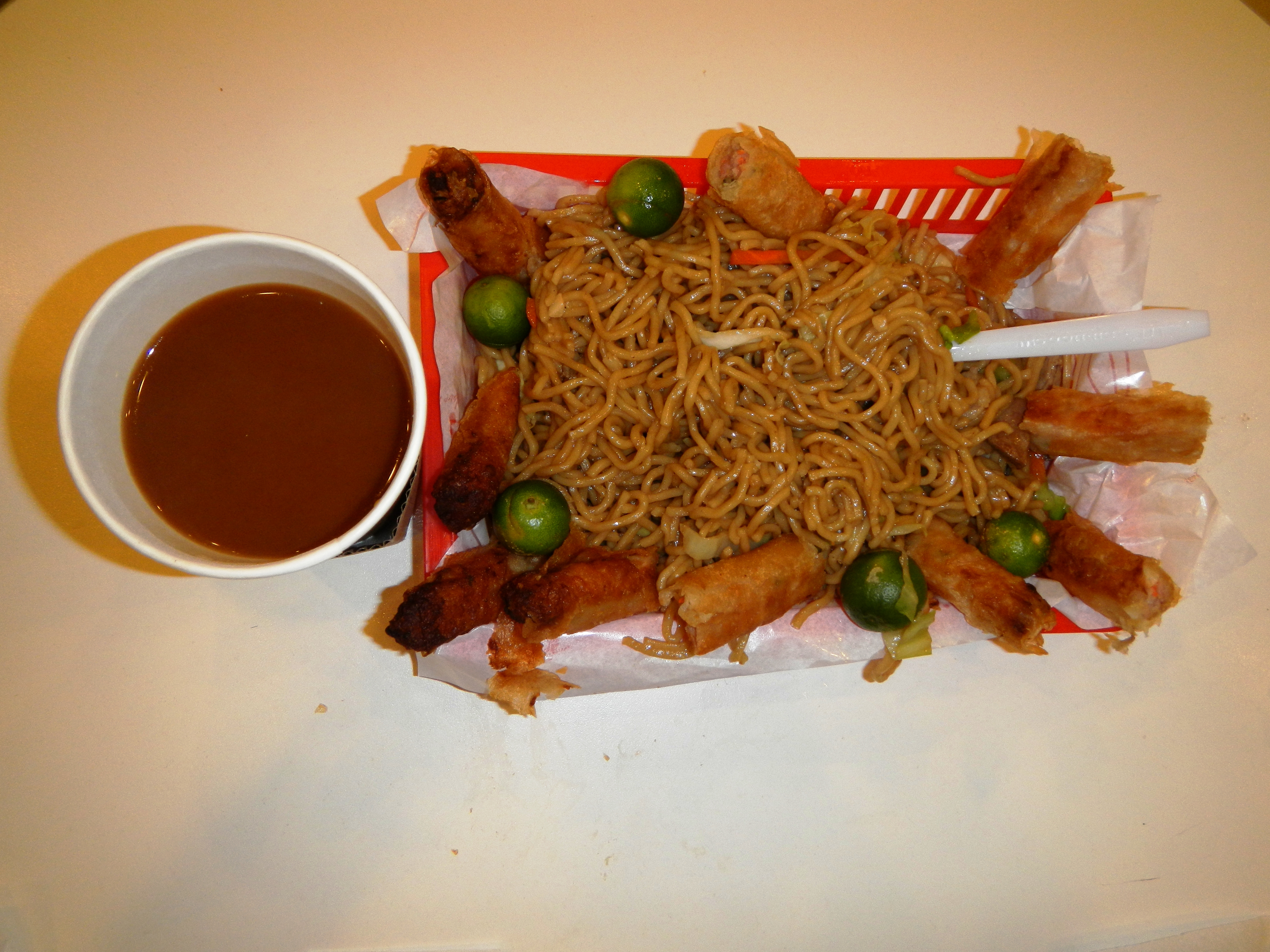
Lumpiang Shanghai with pancit Canton, another Filipino dish with a misleading Chinese name

Lumpiang Shanghai is regarded as the most basic type of lumpia in Filipino cuisine. Lumpiang Shanghai can be defined by its use of giniling (ground pork) as the main stuffing. The ground pork is sautéed with finely chopped carrots, garlic, onions, shallots, and salt and pepper to taste. A small amount of it is then placed on a lumpia wrapper (a thin egg crêpe) which is then rolled around it into a thin cylinder. The ends are secured by wetting it with a bit of water or egg whites. Sometimes, the fried giniling are further moistened with raw eggs so they retain their shape better. It is then deep-fried until golden brown.

It is commonly served with agre dulce (sweet and sour) dipping sauce (which accentuates its "Chinese-ness"). It can also use other common lumpia dipping sauces like banana ketchup, sweet chili sauce, garlic mayonnaise, or vinegar with labuyo peppers and calamansi.

Lumpiang Shanghai is one of the most ubiquitous dishes served in Filipino parties, along with variations of pancit (noodles). They are commonly prepared ahead and stored in the refrigerator, and only deep-fried immediately before serving.

== Variations ==
The basic recipe can be modified easily and is adapted to numerous variants. However, unless the variants still use ground pork as its main stuffing, the variants are usually simply referred to generically as "lumpia".

Common variations include using ground beef, ground shrimp, or shredded chicken. Other ingredients may also be added, including green peas, raisins, cheese, peppers, milk, water chestnuts, singkamas (jicama), and kintsay (Chinese celery), among others.

== See also ==
- Dinamita
- Lumpiang keso
- Lumpiang ubod
- Empanada
- Siopao
