= Pie tee =

Southeast Asian pastry dish

Kueh pie tee
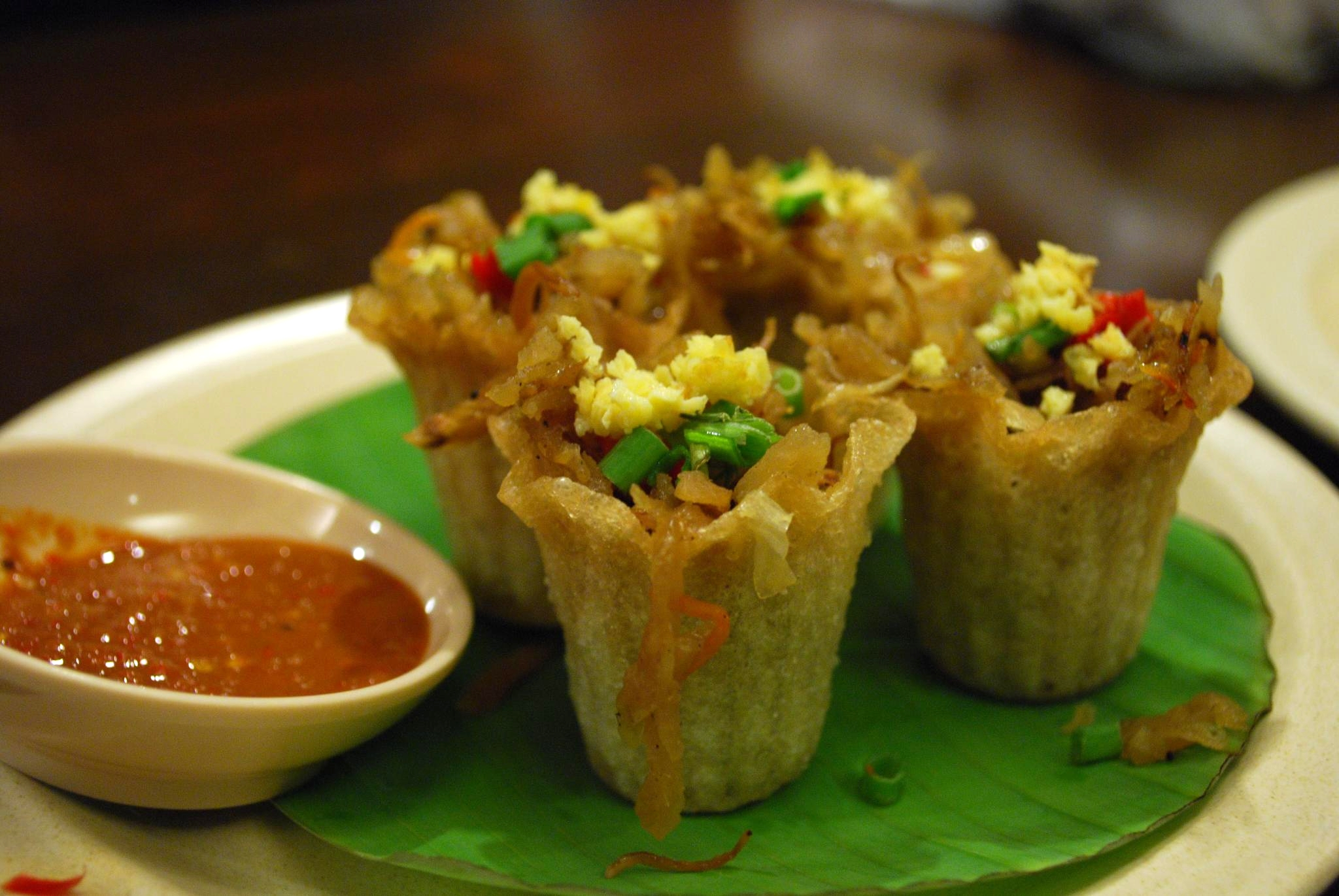
- Pie tees served in Kuala Lumpur, Malaysia
- Course: Pastry
- Place of origin: Singapore or Malaysia
- Region or state: Southeast Asia
- Associated cuisine: Malaysia, Singapore, Indonesia

Kueh pie tee or kuih jambang is a thin and crispy pastry tart shell kuih often filled with a spicy, sweet mixture of thinly sliced vegetables and prawns. It is a popular Malay and Peranakan dish, often consumed during occasions like tea parties, weddings or Chinese New Year.

== History ==
=== Names ===
The phrase pie tee (or pai ti or pai tee) may have been derived from the English term 'patty'; particularly 'patty irons': special cast iron molds used for making pastries similar to rosettes which can be found similarly such as in Sweden (krustadjärn, "croustade iron"), which have been introduced to Singapore in the 1900s.

The jambang in kuih jambang means 'vase' in the local Singaporean Malay dialect. In Malaysian English, they are sometimes known as 'tophats'.

=== Spread ===
The dish may have been of Western origin and invented in the 20th century. Singaporean historian Khir Johari researched that Malay Singaporeans may have acquired the knowledge for their kuih jambang from 1950s Indonesian cookbooks which lists frituurtjes or kwei patti filed with chicken "ragout" as a "European dish" (makanan Eropah). The localised kuih jambang however uses a filling similar to that of the popiah, and Singaporean recipe books like Ellice Handy's My Favourite Recipes (1952) features both the popiah and pie tee side-by-side with her Pie Tee recipe contains only instructions to make the shells.

Peranakan writer Baba Ong Jin Teong has also suggested in his Peranakan heritage books that the kueh pie tee may have originated in Singapore. The recipe found in Ong's book Penang Heritage Food belongs to his mother, who compiled the recipe in the 1950s. Additionally, the kueh pie tee is also known as the 'Singapore Poh Piah' or 'Syonan-to Pie', further suggesting that the snack may have originated from Singapore.

== Making ==
The shells are made of flour, and the batter may be added with slaked lime or carbonated water for more crunch. Though some stores will make them from scratch, they can usually be found ready-made in most supermarkets.

Similar to popiah, the Peranakan pai tee filling is shredded jicama and carrots, and usually these two dishes are sold by the same stall in hawker centres. The Malay kuih jambang, however, is often filled with spiced beef and topped with chives, chilies and onions.

== See also ==
- Kue
- Chinese Indonesian cuisine
- Malay cuisine
- Peranakan cuisine
