= Ayam buah keluak =

Peranakan dish made of chicken

Ayam Buah Keluak
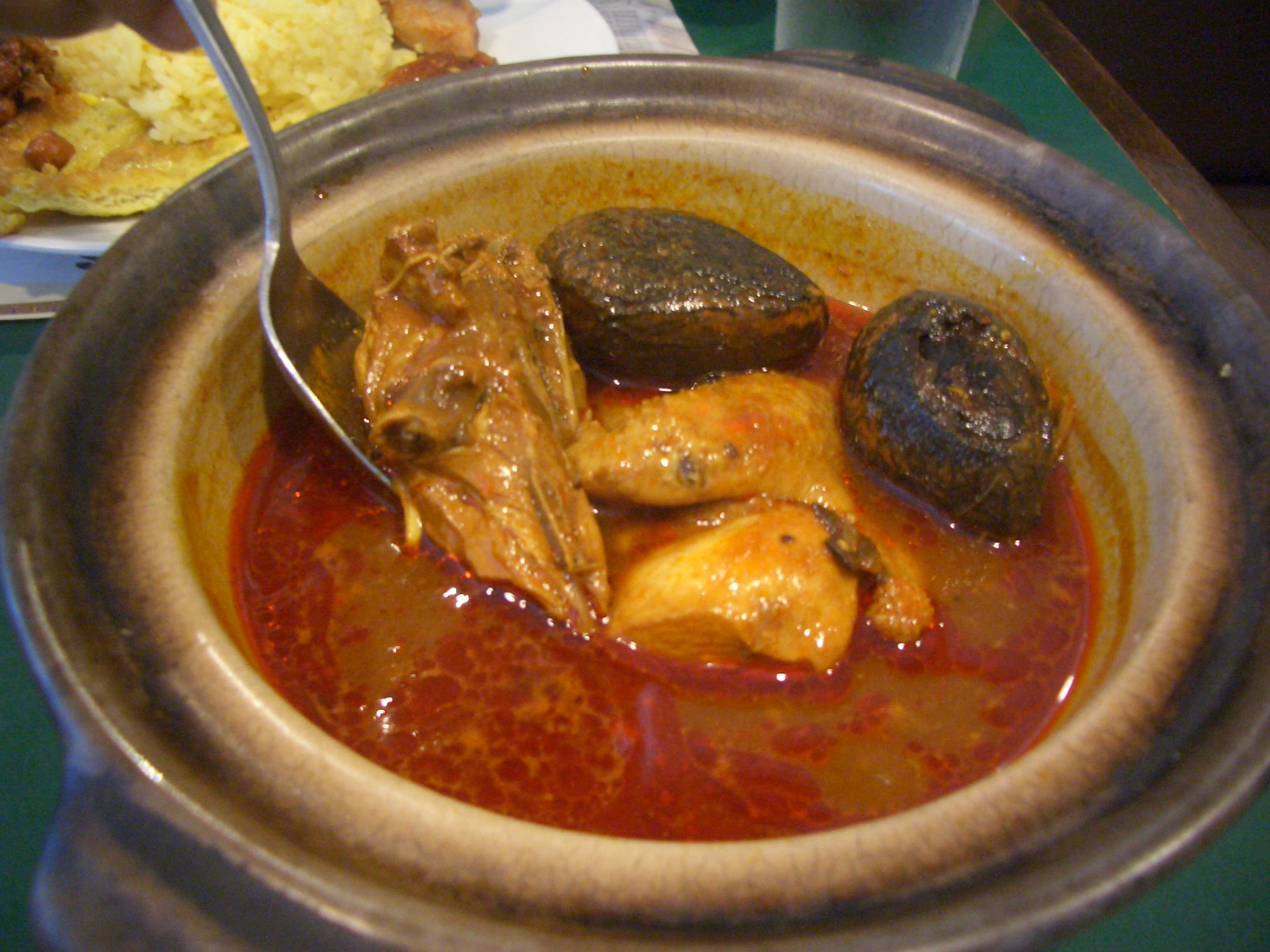
- A plate of Ayam Buah Keluak
- Course: Main course
- Place of origin: Malaysia/Singapore
- Region or state: Indonesia, Malaysia and Singapore
- Created by: Peranakan, Kristang
- Serving temperature: Room temperature
- Main ingredients: meat, buah keluak, gula melaka

Ayam buah keluak is a traditional Peranakan dish consisting of chicken (ayam), tamarind gravy and buah keluak nuts. It is normally served with rice. It is also one of the favourite dishes of Singapore's founding Prime Minister, Lee Kuan Yew and his son, Lee Hsien Loong.

== Description ==
Ayam buak keluak is a famous Peranakan dish which can be found in Indonesian, Malaysian and Singaporean cuisine. Keluak and the tamarind gravy being the most important ingredient, it is one of the most time-consuming Peranakan dishes to make. The spicy gravy consists of several spices including candlenuts, turmeric, chilli, galangal, and belacan. Lemongrass and the flesh of the keluak will be added after the gravy was fried fragrant. Then part of the mixture will be mixed with chicken and then filled back into the keluak nut, and the rest of the mixture will be made into a thick gravy with chicken soup and tamarind juice.

This dish is normally served with rice. Usually, people will consume the chicken, gravy and the mixture in the keluak nut.

== History ==
Although most Peranakan dishes were influenced by Hokkien and Malay cuisine, ayam buah keluak was influenced more by Indonesian cuisine since keluak is originally from Indonesia's mangrove swamps. It was brought to Malacca from Java and Sumatra when Malacca was an important trading port in the 15th century.

== Variants ==
Peranakans and Eurasians cook this dish in different ways. Peranakans usually remove the flesh from the nut, mix it with chicken, fill them back into the nut and then cook them in curry while Eurasians cook it in curry without taking out the flesh. Sometimes chicken can be replaced by pork. This dish is important to Peranakans who use the dish as a tribute to their ancestors. In Eurasian culture, this dish is considered a luxury.

== See also ==
- List of Indonesian soups
- Rawon
- Peranakan cuisine
- Eurasian cuisine of Singapore and Malaysia
- Javanese cuisine
- Indo cuisine
- Malay cuisine
