= Sura K'uchu (Bolivia) =

Mountain in Bolivia

Coordinates: 18.3167°S 69.0333°W

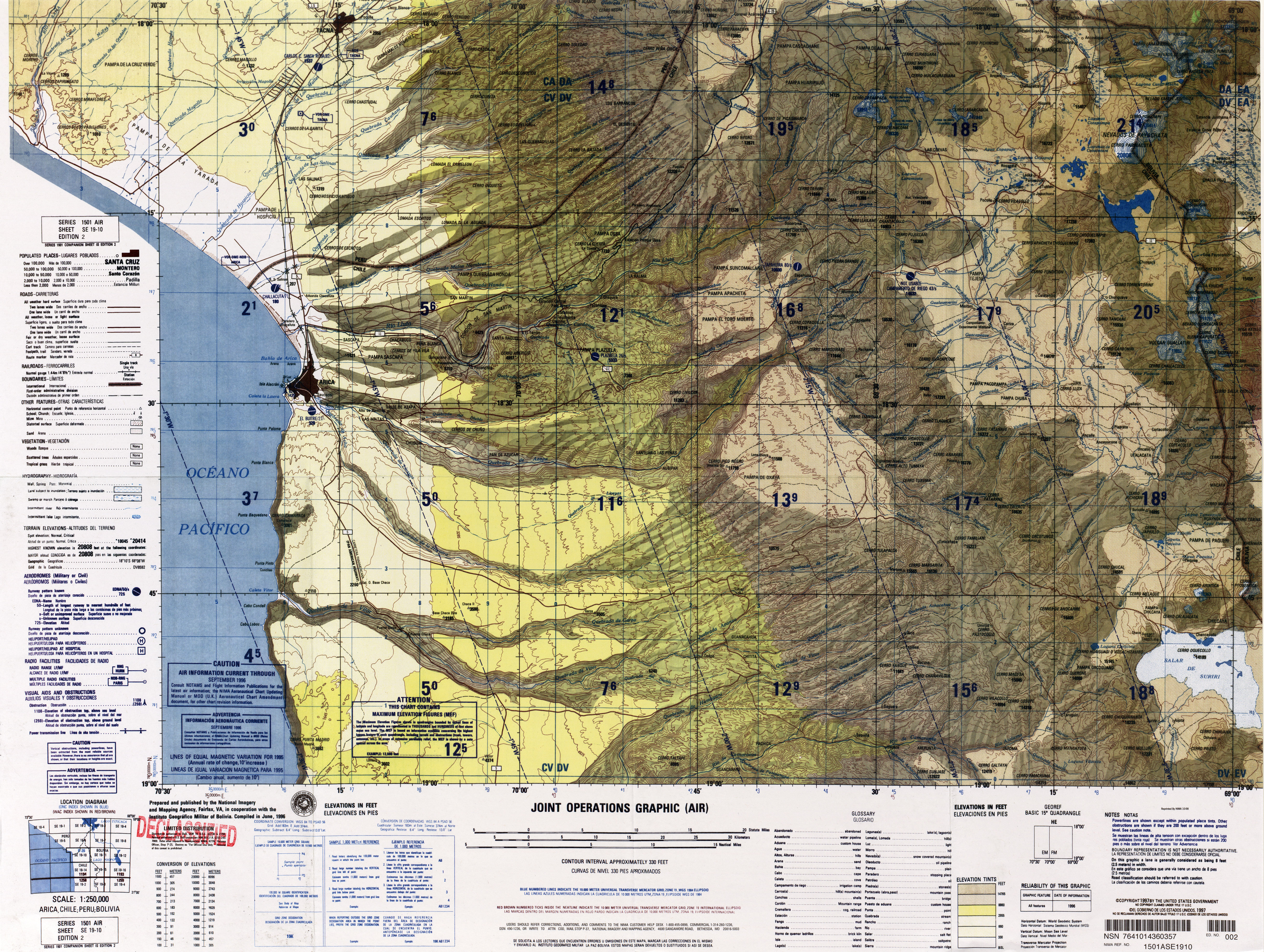
Map showing the location of Sura K'uchu near the border of Bolivia and Chile

Sura K'uchu (Aymara sura dry jiquima, a species of Pachyrhizus, k'uchu, q'uch'u corner, "sura corner", hispanicized spelling Sora Khucho) is a region in the Cordillera Occidental in the Andes of Bolivia. It is located in the Oruro Department, Sajama Province, Turku Municipality, Chachakumani Canton. Sura K'uchu is situated south-east of the Uqi Uqini volcano and north-east of the volcano Umurata. It lies south of National Route 4 near the Chungara-Tambo Quemado pass. The river Jaruma originates here. It flows to the north-east as an affluent of the Sajama River.

== See also ==
- Acotango
- Capurata
- List of mountains in the Andes
