= Kari kapitan =

Indonesian Chinese cuisine

- Course: Main course
- Place of origin: Malaysia
- Region or state: Penang
- Serving temperature: Hot
- Main ingredients: Chicken

Kari kapitan, or Captain's chicken curry, is a classic Penang Nyonya dish. It is normally a richer, drier, and thicker version of the standard local chicken curry, with each household having its own family recipe.

The origins of the name of the dish, Kari kapitan, are much debated. One popular suggestion is that a ship's captain during the colonial period in Penang asked his cook what was being prepared for dinner, to which the cook responded: 'Kari, kapitan!'. Nonetheless, the title 'kapitan' was first introduced during the 16th century by the Portuguese and was used to indicate a local leader, without any specifically nautical connotation.

== See also ==
- Peranakan cuisine
