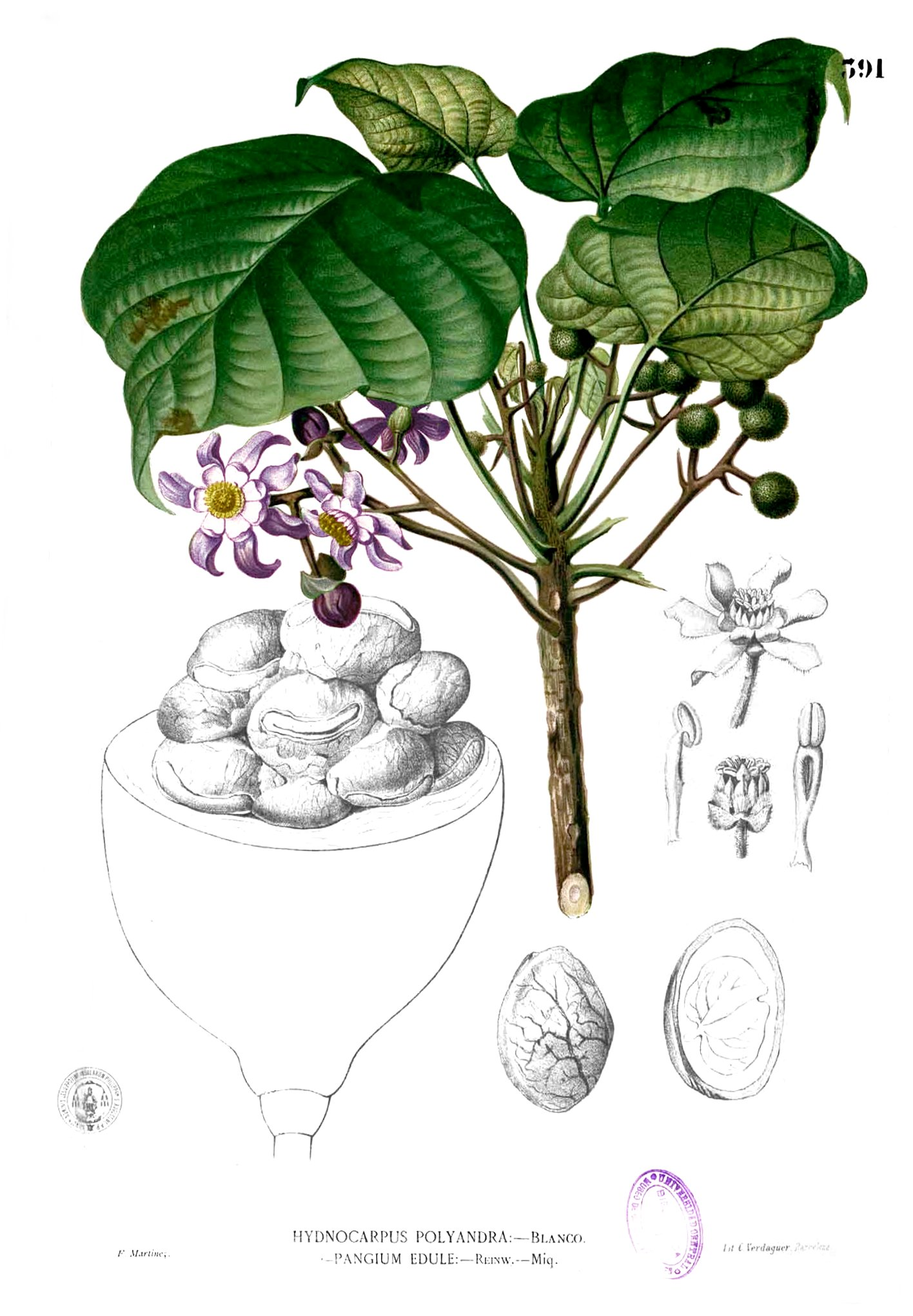
- Plate from book: Flora de Filipinas

Conservation status
- Least Concern (IUCN 3.1)

Scientific classification
- Kingdom: Plantae
- Clade: Tracheophytes
- Clade: Angiosperms
- Clade: Eudicots
- Clade: Rosids
- Order: Malpighiales
- Family: Achariaceae
- Genus: Pangium; Reinw.
- Species: P. edule

Binomial name
- Pangium edule Reinw.

Synonyms
- Hydnocarpus edulis (Reinw.) Peterm.; Hydnocarpus polyandrus Blanco; Pangium ceramense Teijsm. & Binn. ex Slooten; Pangium naumannii Warb.; Pangium rumphii Voigt

= Pangium =

Genus of trees

Rowal (Pangium edule), raw
Nutritional value per 100 g (3.5 oz)
- Energy: 462 kJ (110 kcal)
- Carbohydrates: 23.9 g
- Sugars: 14.1 g
- Dietary fiber: 6.2 g
- Fat: 2 g
- Protein: 2.3 g
Vitamins and minerals
Vitamins	Quantity %DV^{†}
Vitamin A equiv. beta-Carotene	2% 19 μg 2% 230 μg
Vitamin C	29% 25.8 mg
Minerals	Quantity %DV^{†}
Calcium	1% 15 mg
Iron	12% 2.2 mg
Magnesium	8% 32 mg
Manganese	7% 0.155 mg
Phosphorus	4% 52 mg
Potassium	5% 151 mg
Sodium	0% 4 mg
Zinc	4% 0.43 mg
- Link to USDA Database entry
- ^{†}Percentages estimated using US recommendations for adults, except for potassium, which is estimated based on expert recommendation from the National Academies.

Pangium is a genus in the family Achariaceae containing the sole species Pangium edule, a tall tree native to the mangrove swamps of Southeast Asia (from the Philippines, Malaysia, Indonesia to Papua New Guinea, and extending eastward to the Vanuatu and Micronesia). It produces a large poisonous fruit (the "football fruit" or pangi) which can be made edible by fermentation. It is dioecious, with male and female flowers produced on separate individuals.

== Description ==
The tree can reach 18 metres (59 feet) in height. The leaves are heart-shaped. The brownish fruit grows in clusters and is shaped like a pear.

== Cultivation ==
The tree requires many years to mature, and the seeds are therefore most frequently harvested from wild trees, as it is not economically feasible to cultivate. Although poisonous to humans, the seeds of the tree form part of the natural diet of the babirusa (Babyroussa babyrussa).

== Uses ==
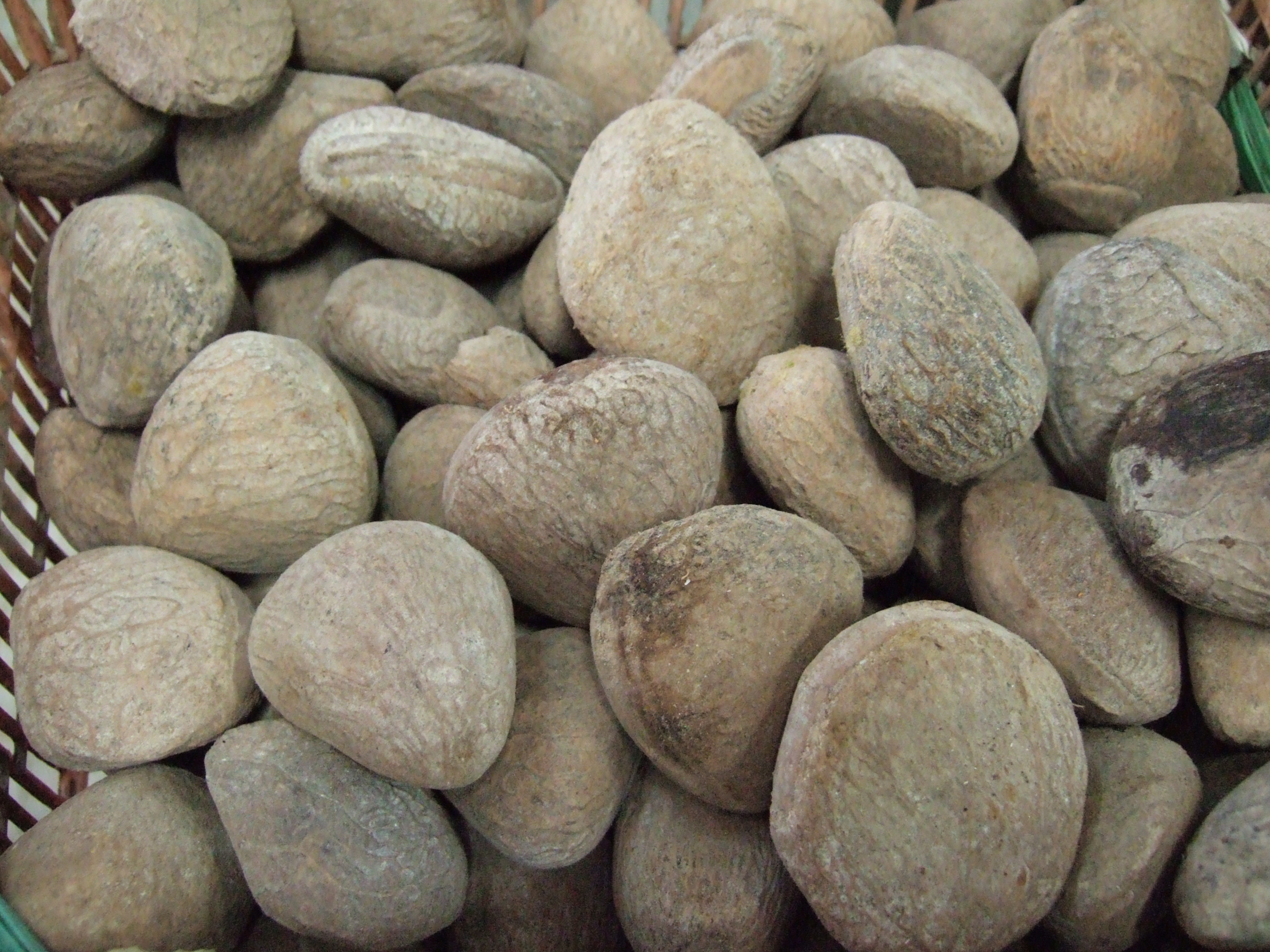
Seeds used as spice in Indonesian cooking (rawon beef stew)

The fresh fruit and seeds contain hydrogen cyanide, and are thus deadly poisonous if consumed without prior preparation. The seeds are first boiled and then buried in ash, banana leaves and earth for forty days, during which time they turn from a creamy white colour to dark brown or black. The method relies on the fact that the hydrogen cyanide released by the boiling and fermentation is water-soluble and easily washed out.

The kernels may be ground up to form a thick black gravy called rawon. Popular dishes include nasi rawon, beef stew in keluwek paste, popular in East and Central Java, and sambal rawon, rawon stew made with beef or chicken, also made in East Java. In West Java and Jakarta, gabus pucung, snakehead fish in pucung paste soup, is a popular traditional dish in Betawi cuisine. The Toraja dish pammarrasan (black spice with fish or meat, also sometimes with vegetables) uses the black keluak powder. In Singapore and Malaysia, the seeds are best known as an essential ingredient in ayam (chicken) or babi (pork) buah keluak, a mainstay of Peranakan cuisine. The Dusun tribe of Borneo use this pounded kernel as main ingredient for making local signature dish called bosou, a sour fermented fish.

People of the Minahasa tribe in North Sulawesi use the young leaves as a vegetable, slicing them small, then cooking them with herbs and pork fat or meat inside bamboo. Many sellers in the Tomohon traditional market sell the leaves.

The Obu Manuvu community of Marilog District, Davao City, Philippines, have indigenous processing methods for Pangi seeds that render it safe for consumption. The seeds are first washed then boiled for 30 minutes, cooled, drained, and sliced into halves to remove the embryos. It is then placed in a net bag and fastened to a makeshift pipe, submerged on to a flowing river to rinse and soak overnight. The processed seeds are usually eaten as is or can be added as an ingredient to other local dishes of the community.

=== Nutrition ===
The edible portions of the plant are an excellent source of vitamin C and high in iron. Its seeds also contain minerals such as calcium, iron, zinc, and manganese.
