= Turnip (disambiguation) =

The turnip is a root vegetable.

Turnip or The Turnip may also refer to:

== Other vegetables ==
The term "turnip" usually refers to the white turnip (Brassica rapa subsp. rapa). In some English-speaking countries it can refer to:

- Rutabaga (yellow turnip, neep, swede, Brassica napus, or B. napobrassica)
- Pachyrhizus erosus (Mexican turnip, yam bean, sweet turnip, jícama)
- Daikon (white radish, mooli; Raphanus sativus var. longipinnatus)
- Kohlrabi (German turnip or turnip cabbage; Brassica oleracea)

== Other plants ==
- Jack-in-the-pulpit (bog onion, Indian turnip, or Arisaema triphyllum) an unpalatable to toxic wild root of North America
- Prairie turnip (timpsila, breadroot, wild turnip, or Pediomelum esculentum) a traditional wild root staple of the US plains

== Arts and entertainment ==
- "The Turnip", a German fairy tale collected by the Brothers Grimm
- Turnip Prize, a spoof prize recognising deliberately bad modern art
- Mr. Turnip, a character in the 1950s British television programme Whirligig
- Turnip (Chrono Cross), a playable character in the video game Chrono Cross

== Nickname ==
- Charles Townshend, 2nd Viscount Townshend (1674–1738), English politician nicknamed "Turnip" Townshend for promoting the cultivation of turnips

== See also ==
- Turnip Rock, Michigan, United States, a small geological formation
