= Beh Gaik Lean =

Malaysian chef

- Born: 1952 or 1953 (age 72–73); Malaysia
- Years active: 2013–present
- Culinary career
- Cooking style: Peranakan cuisine
- Rating: Michelin stars
- Current restaurant: Auntie Gaik Lean's Old School Eatery

Beh Gaik Lean (born 1952 or 1953) is a Malaysian chef of Peranakan cuisine. In 2022, the self-taught chef and her restaurant Auntie Gaik Lean's Old School Eatery were awarded a Michelin star when she was 69 years old. With the award, Gaik Lean became the first Malaysian woman to be awarded a Michelin star.

== Biography ==
Beh Gaik Lean was born in Malaysia, a fourth-generation Nyonya, or Peranakan Chinese. Her father was a British Army soldier, who instilled in her the importance of hard work. As a child, her mother taught her to grind chilies for sambal and prepare ingredients for meals. Gaik Lean began cooking for the family at age 12, as she was taught to maintain the household by her mother.

=== Early culinary career ===
Gaik Lean married at 18 and started a family. Finances were tight and Gaik Lean would sell homemade kuih on the roadside to support her family. When she was 21-years-old, Gaik Lean found a job cooking in the cafeteria of a Motorola factory. There, Gaik Lean continued to develop her cooking skills. Gaik Lean would later go on to cook for other factory kitchens in Malaysia, including Dell and Intel. While working in the factory kitchens, Gaik Lean's children would stay with her mother, where they recalled times were often difficult. In her 40s, Gaik Lean moved to Kuala Lumpur to train chefs.

=== Auntie Gaik Lean's Old School Eatery ===
In 2013, Gaik Lean's eldest son Adrian Tan encouraged her to move back home to run a restaurant he had purchased and named after her, without her knowledge. That year, Adrian and Gaik Lean opened Auntie Gaik Lean's Old School Eatery in Penang, specializing in Peranakan cuisine. The eatery soon became known for its Peranakan dishes, made without pork and with halal chicken, so it is accessible to Malay Muslims. Che Puan Besar Kalsom Abdullah and other members of Malaysia's royal family are known to be regular diners. Everything in the restaurant is made on site.

=== Michelin recognition ===
In late 2022, Auntie Gaik Lean's Old School Eatery was awarded one of four Michelin stars in Malaysia. At the time, she was 69-years-old. When she received the news she was awarded a Michelin star, Gaik Lean reportedly had "to Google" the accolade as she was unsure what it was. Since the initial award, Gaik Lean and Auntie Gaik Lean's Old School Eatery have continued to maintain their Michelin status.

== See also ==
- List of female chefs with Michelin stars
