= Peranakan cuisine =

Cuisine of the Straits Chinese people

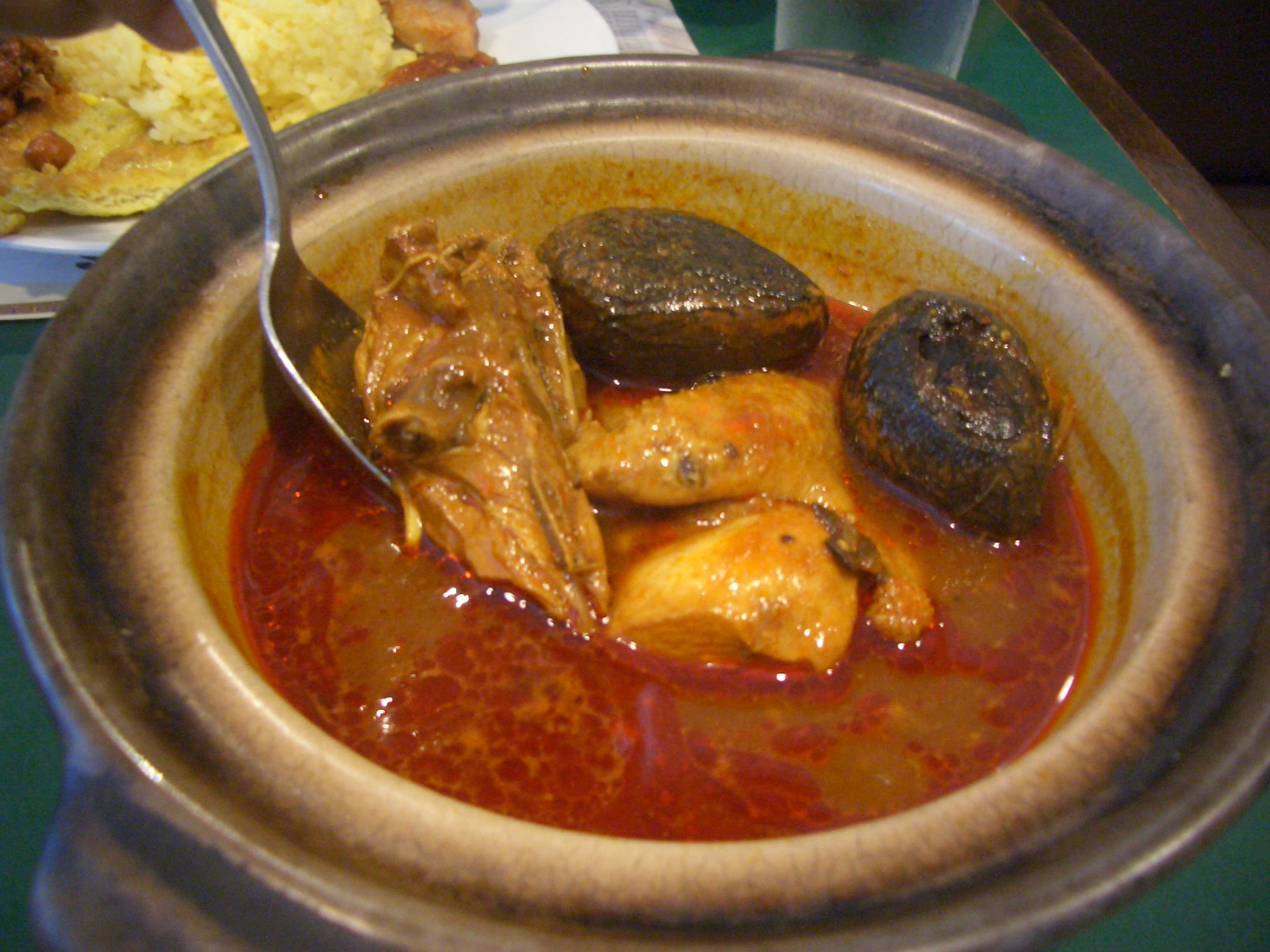
Chicken with keluak

Peranakan cuisine or Nyonya cuisine comes from the Peranakans, descendants of early Chinese migrants who settled in Penang, Malacca, Singapore and Indonesia, inter-marrying with local Malays. In Baba Malay, a female Peranakan is known as a nonya (also spelled nyonya), and a male Peranakan is known as a baba. The cuisine combines Chinese, Malay, Javanese, South Indian, and other influences.

== Overview ==
Nyonya cooking is the result of blending Chinese ingredients with various distinct spices and cooking techniques used by the Malay/Indonesian community. This gives rise to Peranakan interpretations of Malay/Indonesian food that is similarly tangy, aromatic, spicy and herbal. In other instances, the Peranakans have adopted Malay cuisine as part of their taste palate, such as assam fish and beef rendang. Key ingredients include coconut milk, galangal (a subtle, mustard-scented rhizome similar to ginger), candlenuts as both a flavoring and thickening agent, laksa leaf, pandan leaves (Pandanus amaryllifolius), belachan, tamarind juice, lemongrass, torch ginger bud, jicama, fragrant kaffir lime leaf, and cincalok – a powerfully flavored, sour and salty shrimp-based condiment that is typically mixed with lime juice, chillies and shallots and eaten with rice and other side dishes.

There are regional variations in Nyonya cooking. Dishes from the island of Penang in the northern part of Peninsular Malaysia possess Thai influences, such as more liberal use of tamarind and other sour ingredients. Dishes from Singapore and Malacca show a greater Indonesian influence, such as the use of coconut milk. A classic example is laksa (a spicy noodle soup), which comes in two variants: the sour asam laksa from Penang and the coconut milk-based laksa lemak from Singapore and the southern regions of Peninsular Malaysia.

The flavor of laksa and other Nonya recipes is determined by the rempah, which in Malay means spices. The various combinations are pounded into a paste with a mortar and pestle, with a very specific texture and density. It is said that a Nyonya can determine the culinary skill of a new daughter-in-law simply by listening to her preparing rempah with a mortar. Nonya recipes are handed down from one generation to the next, and because of the time-consuming preparation of these dishes, it is a cuisine that is often at its best when served at home. Laksa is a notable exception to this rule.

Examples of Nonya specialities include otak-otak, a popular blend of fish, coconut milk, chilli paste, galangal, and herbs wrapped in a banana leaf; ayam buah keluak, a distinctive dish combining chicken pieces with nuts from the Pangium edule or kepayang tree to produce a rich sauce; and itek tim, a classic soup containing duck, tomatoes, green peppers, salted vegetables, and preserved sour plums simmered gently together.

Nonya desserts include colourful cakes (kue) and sweet, sticky delicacies.

== List of Nyonya dishes ==
- Achar, various pickled meats and vegetables like achar keat-lah (honey lime/calamansi), achar hu (fried fish), achar kiam hu (salt fish), achar timun (cucumber), achar awat (mixed vegetables).
- Apam balik or terang bulan, a bread like puff with sugar, corn, and coarse nut in the middle.
- Asam laksa, a soup noodle dish consisting of a bowl of translucent al dente white rice noodles served in a spicy soup made of fish (usually mackerel), tamarind (both asam jawa and asam gelugor), and daun kesum. Toppings differ considerably, and may include onion, mint, chopped torch ginger flower, and slices of pineapple and cucumber. A dollop of pungent, viscous sweet fermented shrimp paste (petis udang or hae ko) is usually served on the side. This dish is considered one of Penang's three signature dishes.
- Ayam buah keluak, a chicken or pork rib stew cooked with the nuts from the kepayang tree (Pangium edule), a mangrove tree that is native to Indonesia, but grown widely in both Indonesia and Malaysia. For this recipe, the contents of the buah keluak is dug out and sauteed with aromatics and seasonings, before it is stuffed back into the nuts and braised with the chicken or pork rib pieces.
- Ayam/babi pongteh, a stew of chicken or pork cooked with tauchu or salted fermented soy beans, and gula melaka. It is usually saltish-sweet and can be substituted as a soup dish in Peranakan cuisine. Pork is more commonly used as this is a Peranakan version of the Chinese braised pork belly.
- Babi assam, a pork stew cooked with tamarind juice. This dish is also popular within the Kristang community.
- Bak chang, Nyonya-style zongzi made in a similar manner as a typical southern Chinese zongzi. However, the filling is typically minced pork with candied winter melon, ground roasted peanuts, and a spice mix. The blue butterfly pea flower is used to colour the rice with a shade of blue. Originally, Bak chang would be wrapped in dried bamboo leaves, however, the peranakans in Bangka and Belitung islands in Indonesia have been known to use pandan leaves instead, making their bak chang, known locally as nyuk cung, easily recognised. While some other peranakan group in Kalimantan may also use banana leaves.
- Bubur cha cha, a Betawi-origin dish made of pearled sago, sweet potatoes, yams, bananas, coconut milk, pandan leaves, sugar and salt. Grated coconut, coconut cream and water can be used as additional ingredients. The ingredients are cooked in coconut milk, and the dish can be served hot or cold.
- Cap cai or chap chye, stir-fried vegetables with Chinese Indonesian origin. The Nonya version of this Chinese Indonesian classic incorporates tauchu and dried shrimp.
- Chendol, an iced sweet dessert that contains droplets of green rice flour jelly, coconut milk and palm sugar syrup, arguably came from Banjar region in the island of Java.
- Cincalok, a distinctly Malay condiment made of fermented tiny shrimp (udang geragau), salt and rice. It is also a favoured cooking ingredient used by the Kristang Eurasian community of Malacca. There are varieties of cincalok can be found along both sides of Malacca strait down to the southern part of Sumatra.
- Cincaru, a small fish, deep fried and stuffed with sambal belacan or any other spice.
- Enchi kebin, deep-fried chicken pieces marinated in a paste of coconut milk and rempah (spices).
- Itek tim or kiam chhai ak thng, a soup of duck, preserved mustard greens and cabbage flavoured with nutmeg, Chinese mushrooms, tomatoes and peppercorns.
- Jiu hu char, a dish made up mainly of shredded vegetables like turnip or jicama, carrot, and cabbage and fried together with thinly shredded dried cuttlefish.
- Kari kapitan, a Penang Nonya take on the ubiquitous chicken curry. Kaffir lime leaves and coconut milk are among the key ingredients for this mild curry.
- Kerabu bi hun, a salad dish consisting of rice vermicelli mixed with sambal belachan, calamansi lime juice, and finely chopped herbs and spices. Other famous salad dishes are kerabu bok ni (cloud ear fungus/tikus telinga), kerabu ke (chicken), kerabu ke-kha (chicken feet), kerabu timun (cucumber), kerabu kobis (cabbage), kerabu kacang botol (four angled bean), kerabu bak pue (pork skin).
- Kiam chhai bue, a mixture of leftovers from Kiam Chhai Ak Thng, Jiu Hu Char, Tu Tɵ́ Thng and various other dishes. "Bue" literally means "end".
- Laksa lemak, a type of laksa served in a rich coconut gravy, served with prawns, cockles, lime and a dollop of sambal belacan.
- Lam mee, long yellow noodles cooked in a rich gravy made from a stock of prawns and chicken. It is always served at birthdays to wish the birthday boy or girl a long life, and thus it is also known as birthday noodles.
- Lontong cap go meh, a Peranakan Chinese Indonesian take on the traditional Indonesian dish.
- Masak titik, a style of vegetable soup that makes liberal use of white peppercorns. One version uses watermelon rind as the main ingredient. Another makes use of green or semi ripe papaya.
- Mee siam, dish of fried thin rice vermicelli with spicy gravy.
- Nasi kunyit, a glutinous rice dish seasoned with turmeric powder, coconut milk and asam gelugor. It is usually served with a chicken curry, ang ku kue, and pink-dyed hard-boiled eggs as gifts in celebration of a child of friends and family turning one month old.
- Ngo hiang, a fried meat roll made from spiced minced pork and chopped water chestnuts rolled up in soya bean curd sheets, and deep fried. It is usually served with small bowl of lor (a thick broth thickened with corn starch and beaten eggs) and chili sauce.
- Otak-otak, is a dish involving fish pieces wrapped in banana leaves. Two very different variations exist: one consists of a mixture of fish pieces and spice paste wrapped in banana leaves and char grilled.
- Pempek, is a dish involving deep fried fish balls. There are many varieties of fish balls, kapal selam has an egg inside the fish ball. In Bangka and Belitung islands, the pem-pek is eaten with three different variety of sambals and lime instead. Pempek Palembang is very popular in Indonesia, the fish balls are eaten with a spicy dark sauce made of palm sugar and vinegar known as cuko, topped with fresh cucumber and noodles.
- Perut ikan, a spicy stew (similar to asam pedas in flavour profile) comprising mainly vegetables/herbs and getting its distinctive taste mainly from fish bellies preserved in brine and daun kaduk (the Wild Pepper leaf is from the Piper stylosum or the Piper sarmentosum). A classic Penang Nonya dish.
- Pai ti, is a thin and crispy pastry tart shell filled with a spicy, sweet mixture of thinly sliced vegetables and prawns.
- Popia, a fresh spring roll made of thin paper-like or crepe-like pastry skin of Indonesian-style origin.
- Rendang, a spicy meat stew originating from the Minangkabau cuisine in West Sumatra and adopted by Peranakans throughout archipelago as part of their taste palate.
- Seh bak, a dish of pork loin, marinated overnight with herbs and spices, cooked over a slow fire and simmered to tenderness.
- Swikee is a Peranakan frog leg soup dish, popularly associated with the town of Jatiwangi and Purwodadi in Java, Indonesia.
- Tu tɵ́ thng, literally pig stomach soup, this dish requires a skilled cook to prepare and deodorise the ingredients using salt before cooking. Its main ingredients are pig stomach and white peppercorns.
- Udang masak lemak nenas, sour and sweet shrimp dish with various spices.

== Gallery ==
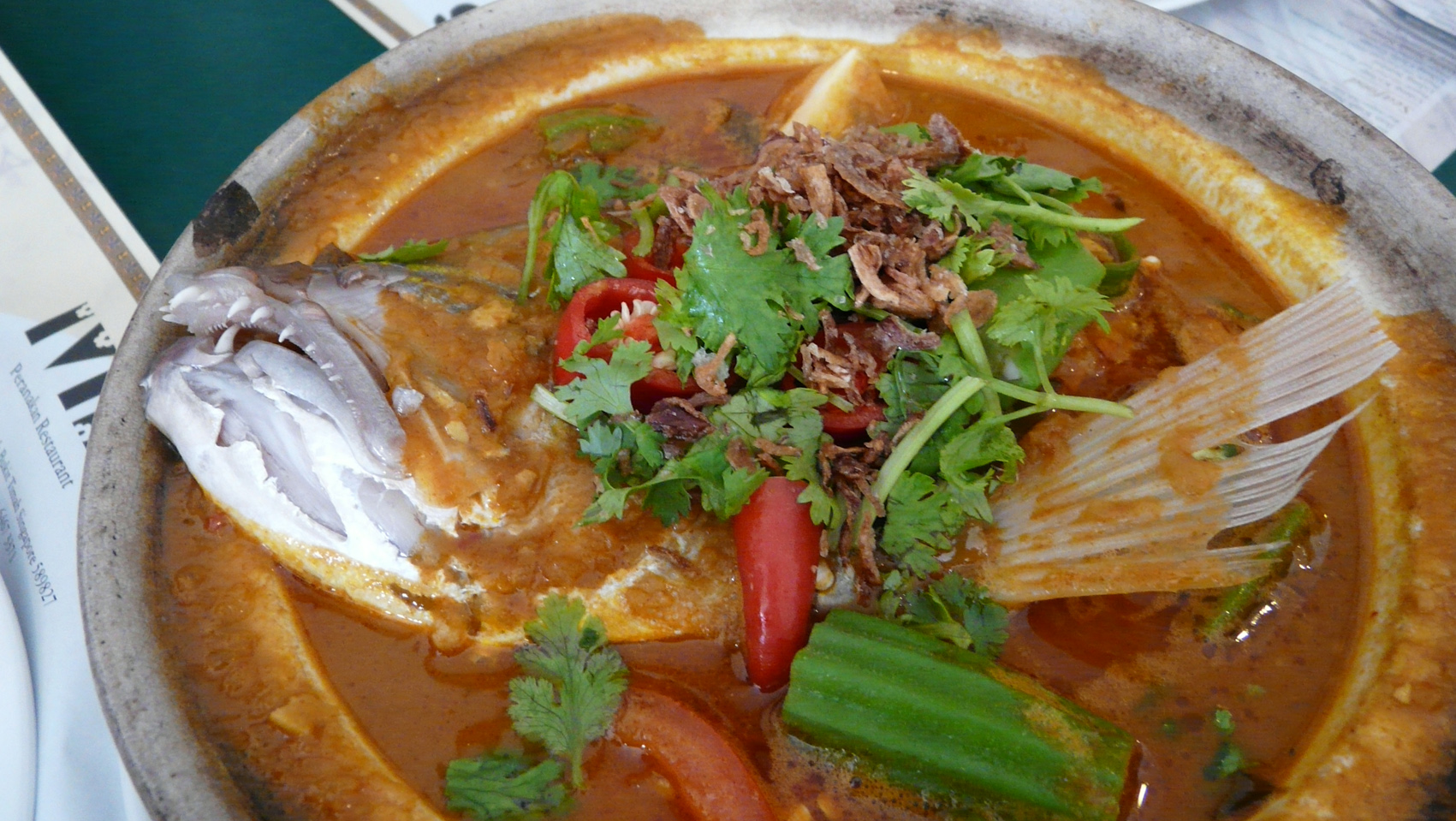
Kari kepala ikan

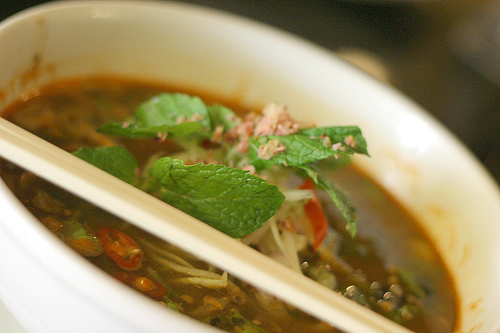
Laksa

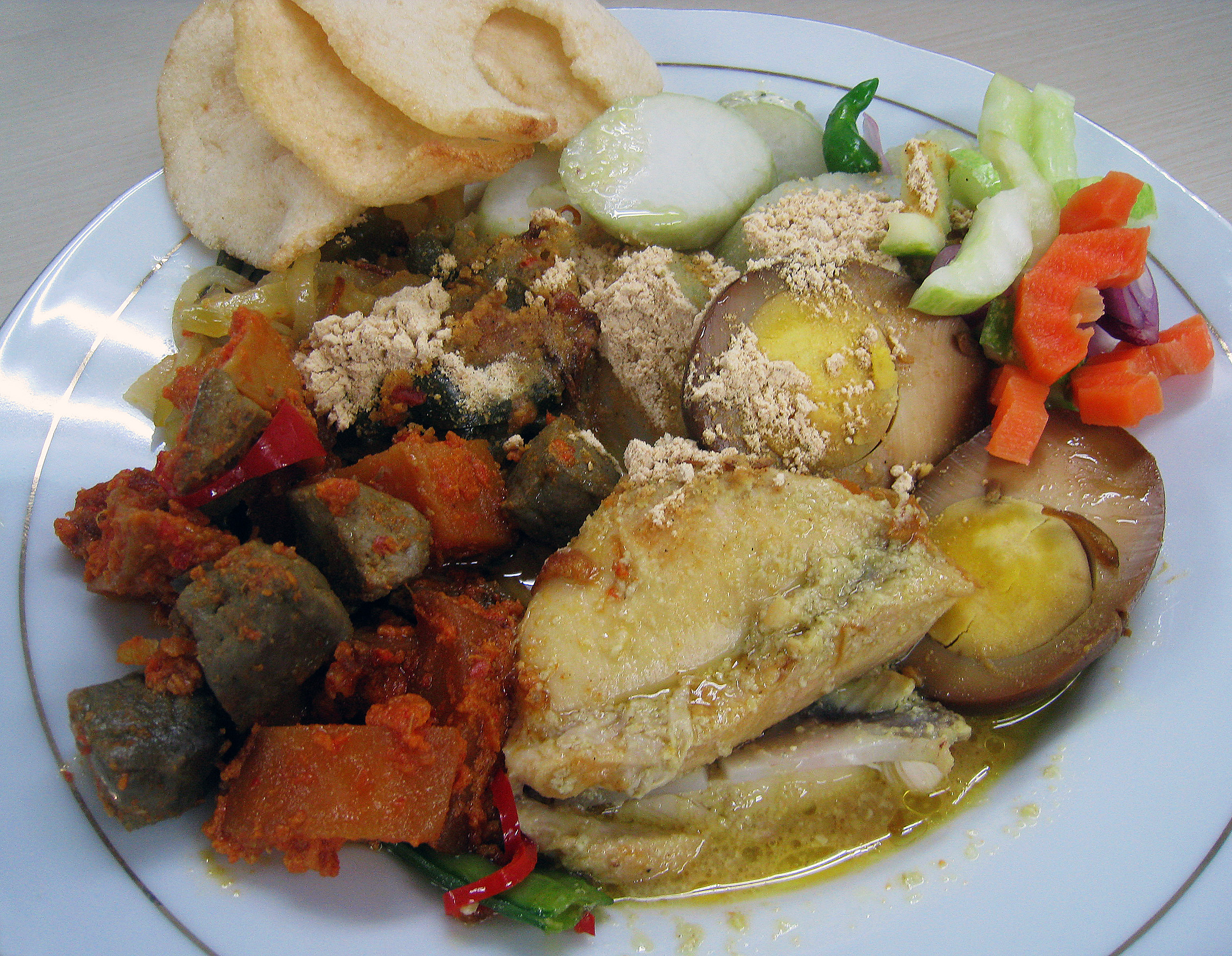
Lontong cap go meh

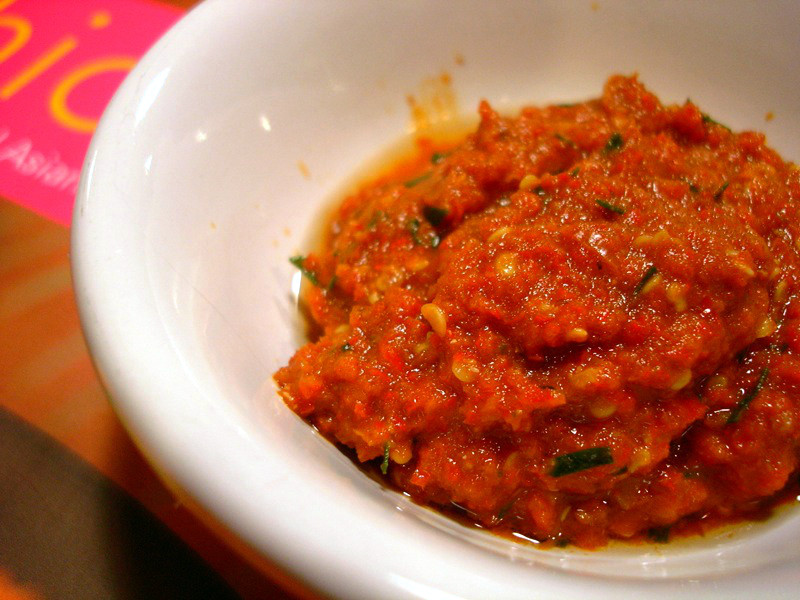
Sambal belacan

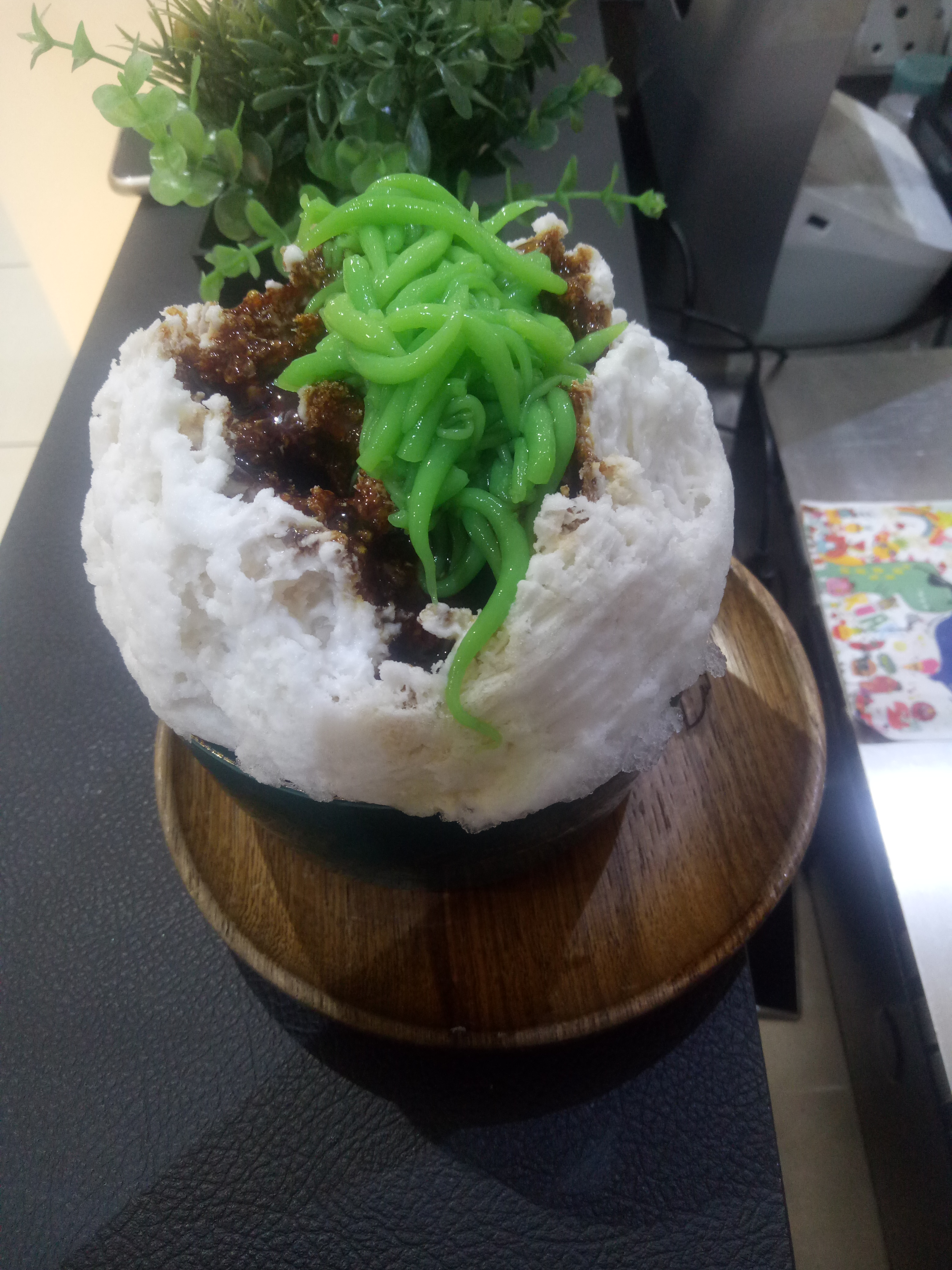
Cendol

== See also ==
- Betawi cuisine
- Chinese Indonesian cuisine
- Javanese cuisine
- Malay cuisine
- Minangkabau cuisine
- Beh Gaik Lean, Malaysian chef who has earned a Michelin star for her Peranakan cooking
