= Rawon =

Indonesian beef soup dish

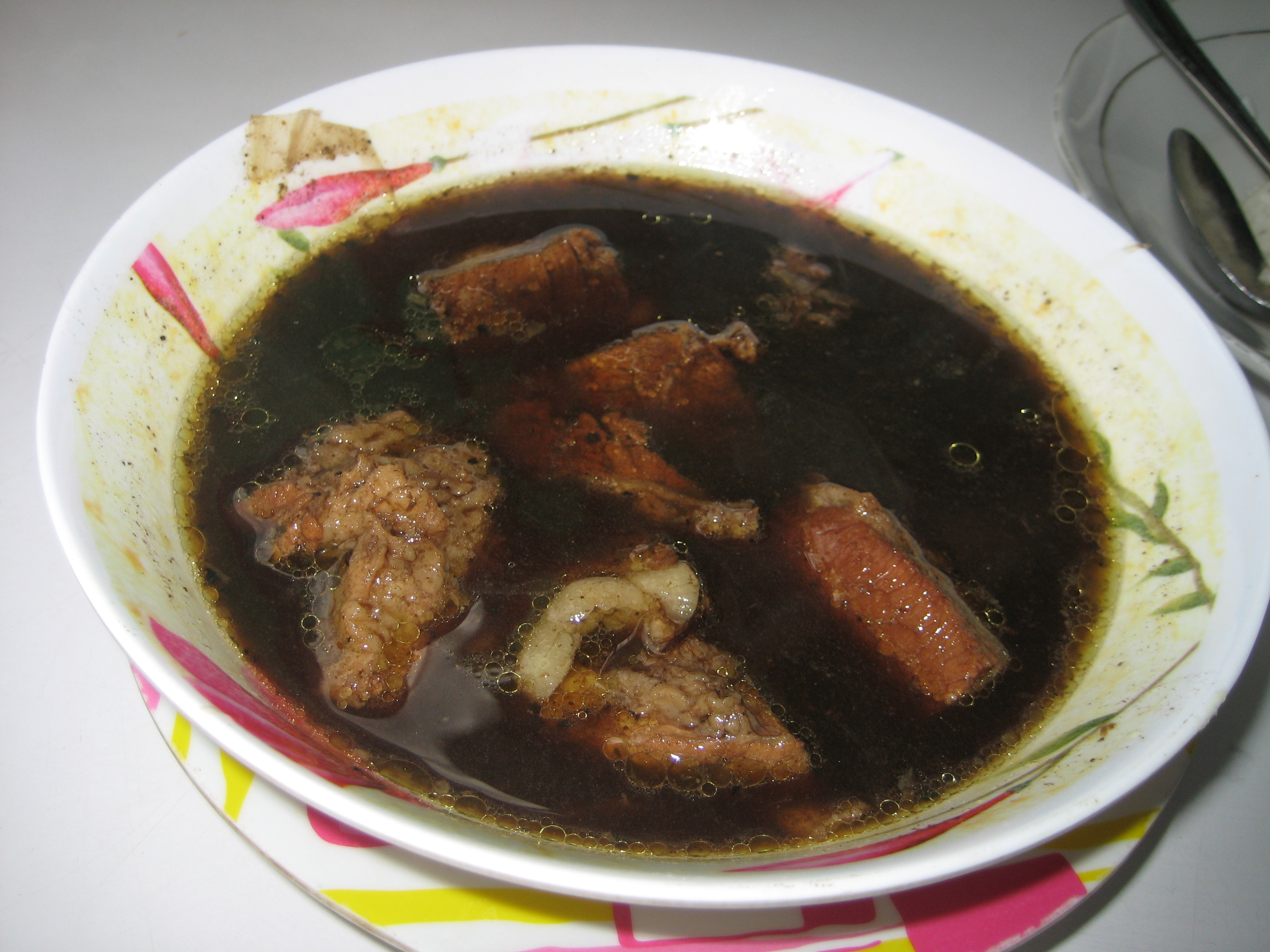
- Rawon setan (devil's rawon), a variation served late at night
- Course: Main course
- Place of origin: Indonesia
- Region or state: Surabaya, Malang, and Ponorogo, East Java
- Associated cuisine: Indonesia, Singapore
- Serving temperature: Hot
- Main ingredients: Meat, keluak nut

Rawon (Javanese: ꦫꦮꦺꦴꦤ꧀) is an Indonesian beef soup. Originating from the Javanese cuisine of East Java, rawon utilizes the black keluak nut as the main seasoning, which gives a dark color and nutty flavor to the soup; thus rawon is often described as "black beef soup".

In 2024, TasteAtlas rawon was rated as the world's best soup. Also, Indonesian soup, Soto Betawi followed in the second place.

== Ingredients ==
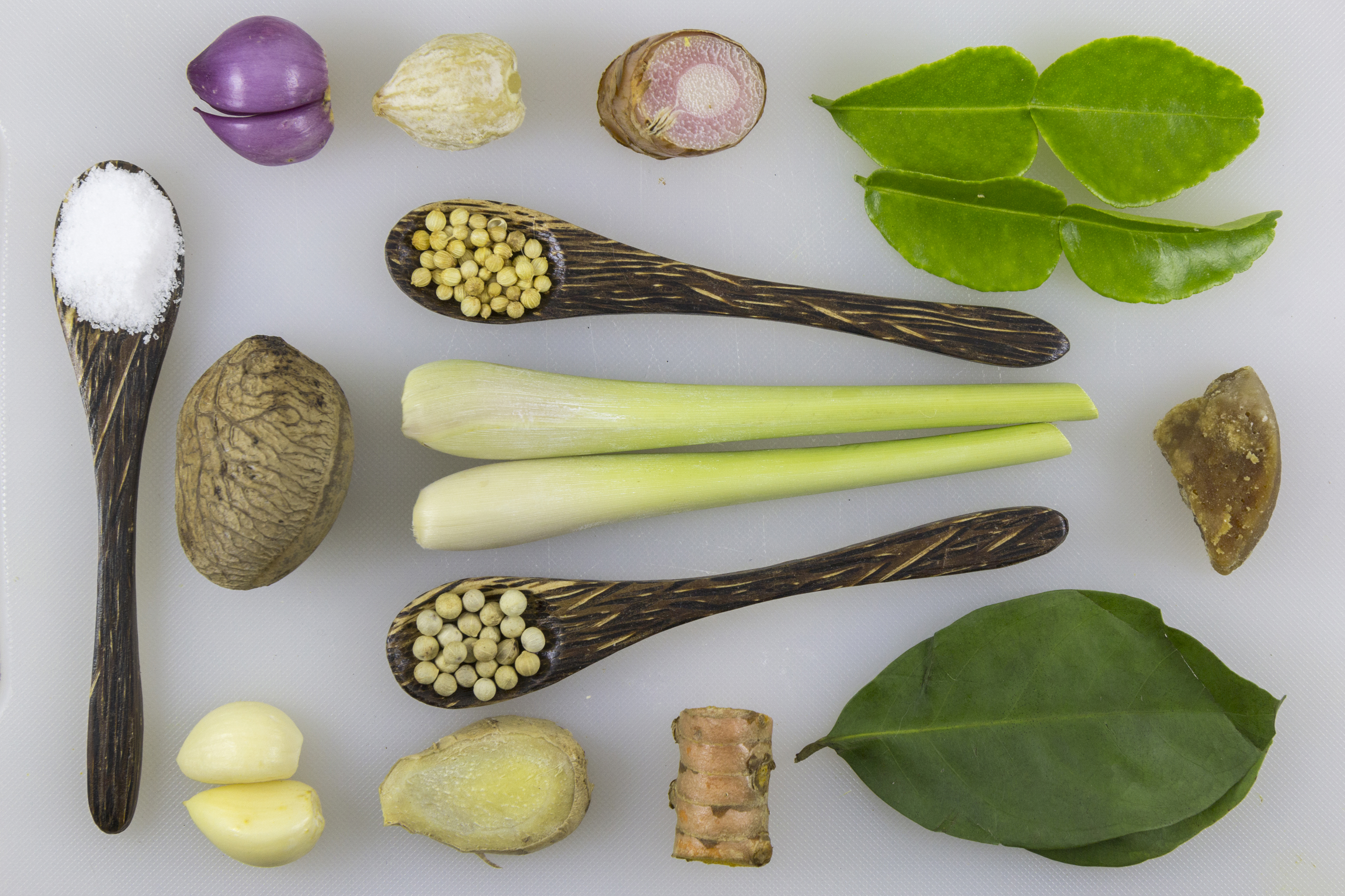
Spices, herbs, and condiments commonly used to make rawon: sugar, garlic, shallots, keluak/pucung, candlenut, coriander, pepper, lemongrass, ginger, kencur, galangal, palm sugar, lime leaves and bay leaves.

The soup is composed of a ground mixture of garlic, shallots, keluak, ginger, candlenut, turmeric, red chili, and salt and is sautéed with oil. The sautéed mixture is then poured into the boiled beef stock filled with beef cubes.

Lemongrass, galangal, bay leaves, kaffir lime leaves, and sugar are then added as seasonings. The special dark or black color of rawon comes from the keluak as the main spice. The soup is usually garnished with green onion and fried shallot and served with rice. Other toppings include bean sprouts, salted preserved egg, krupuk, and fried tolo beans (black-eyed pea).

== History ==
Rawon is one of the oldest historically identified dishes of ancient Java. It was mentioned as rarawwan in an ancient Javanese Taji inscription (901 CE) from the era of the Mataram kingdom.

== Variants ==
There are several variants of rawon, the most popular of which is Surabayan rawon. A version called rawon setan ("devil's rawon") is sold as a late-night meal at Indonesian food stalls open from midnight to dawn, supposedly the hours during which devils roam.

In Balinese cuisine, rawon does not use any keluak—thus, the color is brown instead of black. Additionally, as the Balinese are mostly Hindu, they tend to favor pork over beef.

In Singapore, the dish is known as Nasi Rawon, usually sold at Malay hawker stalls. The dish is usually served with rice, paru (fried beef lung), sambal sotong and gravy made from buah keluak.

== See also ==
- List of Indonesian soups
