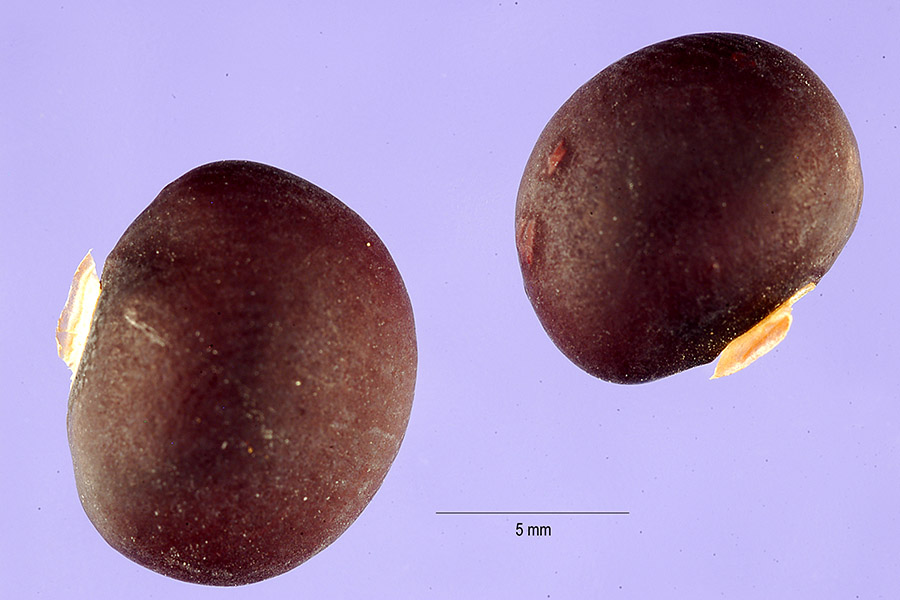
- The beans, about 1 cm (1/2 in) broad

Scientific classification
- Kingdom: Plantae
- Clade: Tracheophytes
- Clade: Angiosperms
- Clade: Eudicots
- Clade: Rosids
- Order: Fabales
- Family: Fabaceae
- Subfamily: Faboideae
- Genus: Pachyrhizus
- Species: P. ahipa

Binomial name
- Pachyrhizus ahipa (Wedd.) Parodi

Synonyms
- Dolichos ahipa Wedd. Pachyrhizus ahipa var. albifora Parodi; Pachyrhizus ahipa var. violacea Parodi

= Pachyrhizus ahipa =

Species of legume

Pachyrhizus ahipa, also called the ahipa or Andean yam bean, is a tuberous root-producing legume, which is distributed mainly in the Andean region.

== Description ==
Pachyrhizus ahipa is member of the Fabaceae and predominantly self-pollinating. It forms a perennial plant and can grow in erect, semierect or twining forms. The erect species can grow to 15–40 centimetres (6–15 1/2 in) tall, the semierect one about 30–60 cm (12–24 in), and the twining forms 60–200 cm (24–79 in) long. The plants are herbaceous and lignified depending on the genotype. They do not show a lateral axis. The leaves are trifoliate with stipules or pinnately arranged leaflets with caduceus stipels.

The flowers, which grow on short stalks, are white blossoms or of a pale lavender colour. They show a tubular calyx and a papilionaceous corolla. Generally, the flowers exhibit an internally curved stigma in close contact with the anthers. This habitus is very unfavourable in connection with the pollination behaviour of insects, as they are not able to pollinate the flowers very effectively. Additionally, the pollen fertility is often not very high. It varies between 45 and 100%. The flowering pattern is not consistent. Each season, 100–800 flowers per plant can be produced. P. ahipa is a short-day plant, so flowering takes place under decreasing day length.

The pods are 13–17 cm (5–6 1/2 in) long and up to 16 millimetres (5/8 in) wide. The seeds are black, lilac, maroon, or black and white mottled. They are round, kidney-shaped, and about 0.8–1 cm long. Seed production differs from plant to plant and lies between 20 and 100 per plant. The thousand-grain weight is around 300 grams (11 oz).

Every plant shows a single swollen root, which thins out toward both ends. The roots are about 15 cm long and usually weigh about 500–800 g (18–28 oz). The yellow skin of the root encloses a white pulp, which is interwoven with a soft fiber.

== Distribution ==
The species is distributed mainly in the Andean region.

Archaeological evidence suggests that the plant was widely distributed by the first century CE. Its first historical mention was in connection with the Indian cultures in the Andes, more precisely in the Salta and Jujuy provinces of Argentina. Indications of Pachyrhizus species in general were also made at the southern coast of Peru, in the Nazca culture. The origin of the plant is most likely in the ceja de montañas Andean region.

== Cultivation ==
=== Sowing ===
Before sowing, the soil must be loosened to a depth of 15–25 cm (6–10 in). Further, the soil has to be thoroughly cleaned from weeds and stones. In Bolivia, P. ahipa is normally sown between August and October, depending on the rainy season. The seeding rate is between 40 and 65 kg/ha. In determining the rate, preferred traits such as tuber size play an important role. Further, soil fertility and seed weight must be taken into account. The planting distance is 20–60 cm (8–23 1/2 in) between rows and 6–25 cm (2 1/2–10 in) between plants in the same row. Therefore, about six to 83 plants/m^{2} are possible. It is planted on ridges, when it is flood irrigated, which is mostly the case in the Andean region.

=== Growing ===
The cultivation period is between five and 10 months. The first flowers appear 87–140 days after sowing. Those flowers are removed manually, a process called reproductive pruning. This means the flowers, as well as the young pods, are removed. The tuberous roots remain the main sink for photosynthates and nutrients. The yield improves drastically. Reproductive pruning is very labour-intensive and must be done once or twice a season. Mature pods normally appear from April through June. At about nine months, the roots are tuberized and the aerial part is completely dry. P. ahipa is normally sown in a pure culture, but can be intercropped with maize. In a crop rotation, it is sown prior to maize/potato, maize/tomato, maize/oca, groundnut or manioc.

=== Environmental conditions ===
Pachyrhizus ahipa can mainly be found in cool tropical and subtropical valleys, on sun-facing slopes, on the border between the warm and cold tropics. The average temperature in this region is 16–18 °C, although the climatic conditions are extremely dependent on the time of day. The precipitation is between 400–700 mm (16–28 in), occurring within 4–6 months, with the rest being the dry season. Therefore, the climate is semiarid. P. ahipa grows to an elevation of 1,800–3,000 m (5,900–9,800 ft) above sea level. Cultivation is mainly carried out along loamy riverbanks. It can also be grown on loamy hillsides. It favours soil pH levels of 6–8 and well-drained soil types.

Pachyrhizus ahipa plants can tolerate long dry spells. However, to increase tuber yield, more water is essential.

=== Nutrient needs ===
At the time of harvest, seeds show high nitrogen contents, but some remains in leaves, providing a nitrogen-rich straw which can be used for animal feeding or as fertilizer, if the plant material is incorporated into the soil. In one season, 67 kg N/ha were taken up by roots and seeds. This nitrogen is mainly provided by the inoculation with efficient bacterial strains. P. ahipa is therefore able to form an efficient symbiosis with nitrogen-fixing bacteria, such as Rhizobium and Bradyrhizobium, and is able to fix 58–80 kg nitrogen per hectare. No further supply of nitrogen fertilizer is needed. If the vegetative aboveground parts are left in the field, a substantial amount of the fixed nitrogen is returned to the soil, about 12–80 kg N/ha. The enrichment is very important if a sustainable land-use system is desired. During nodulation, an increased phosphorus supply is advantageous, because nodulation can be improved. Further, it promotes the root and seed yield in P. ahipa plants. The final recipients of P are the pod shells, as well as the seeds. In total, about 7–9.6 kg P/ha were extracted from the soil. At harvest, the highest potassium contents can be found in pod shells and the roots. The removal of K at harvest was about 20.2 kg K/ha.

=== Disease ===
Pachyrhizus ahipa plants are not very susceptible to pests. Nematodes such as Meloidogyne sp. can pose a serious problem. Further, some of the bean weevil species can be harmful. The most serious viral disease is the bean common mosaic virus (BCMV). Yields can be reduced up to 30% if infected by this virus. If a general irrigation management is lacking, rot is also likely to appear.

=== Harvest ===
The tubers are harvested as soon as the tubers show a marketable weight, depending on consumer’s preferences. Mostly the preferred weight is minimally about 0.4 kg. Harvest duration lasts between 10 and 30 days. The vegetative top is often left on the field to later incorporate it into the fields. If the tubers are not needed at the moment, they can even be left in the soil until needed. Only the plant tops have to be cut off. The yields of the different organs are about 28–53 tonnes/ha for the tuberous roots, 18–36 tonnes/ha for the fruits, and 1.3–2.7 tonnes/ha for the dry seeds.

=== After harvest ===
The optimal storage temperature for tubers is 12.5 to 17.5 °C. Storage, though, changes the ratio of starch and sugar in the direction of sweeter tubers. This characteristic is valued by most consumers. Some farmers leave their tubers in a sunny place before marketing them. Due to a high moisture content, the tubers may shrivel and lose condition during storage and transportation. Another solution to shrivelling could be a thicker epidermis.

It is important to avoid a damage to the tubers while harvesting. If damaged, they are susceptible to attacks by fungi, mainly by Rhizobus stolonifer, Cladosporium sp., and Penicillium sp. An attack of one of those fungi leads to textural changes, decay, and internal browning when stored at low temperatures and high relative humidity (>80%). Seed storage is problematic. Under humid conditions, germination rapidly decreases. This is challenging, because the climate in tropics is very humid in the rainy season.

=== Breeding ===
Several breeding goals are important in P. ahipa, apart from it being used as a vegetable crop, a basic food crop, or a possible industrial crop. Those traits are mainly the reduction of the growth period and a reduced pod formation. If reproductive pruning could be avoided, time and money could be saved.

Pachyrhizus ahipa plants must be propagated sexually, because the reproductive rate by cloning from tubers is very low. Propagation by seed is very advantageous, because transmission of viruses can be avoided and the storage of propagation material is inexpensive.

Several interspecific hybridization experiments have been conducted among all the Pachyrhizus species. The traits of the Andean bean of most interest are tuber quality, growth habit, and early maturity. The results of breeding between the different species showed especially good performing hybrid lines with regard to high tuber yield as well as wide adaptability. Nevertheless, negative secondary effects, such as reduced seed set and reduced germination rates, have been observed.

=== Commercial aspects ===
Its sometimes dwarf-like habit makes P. ahipa well suited for large-scale commercial cultivation. No international trade in P. ahipa occurs. It has a number of qualities that may be attractive for wider cultivation:

- It shows a very good adaptability to climatic and edaphic ranges.
- The protein and starch are nutritionally very well balanced, and the taste is good.
- It shows good postharvest and storage characteristics.
- Nitrogen fixation, demand as fuel wood, and food production are favourable for the environment.

== Nutrition ==
=== Roots ===
The carbohydrate-rich roots can be eaten raw and provide calories and vitamin K and vitamin C, as well as potassium. Normally, it is eaten fresh, almost like a fruit. In some raw cases, it is also prepared as a juice. The roots taste sweet and are crisp like an apple and are an attractive addition to green salads. They can be boiled and even after cooking, they retain their crunchy texture. Ahipa tubers are even considered to have a cleansing effect on the body. It is supposed to cure infections of the throat and the air passage. Its dry matter ranges from 15–30%.

Further, the tuber contains 48–54% starch, which consists of 96–99.9% amylopectin. This is a very high value and especially interesting for food processing, where low solubilisation and retrogradation are important. Because of the high starch and amylopectin content, ahipa is a good material for the starch industry. Further, the suitability of the Andean bean depends on other factors such as extractability of the starch, the diameter of the starch granules or particles and their distribution. After nine months, the starch granules are very homogenously distributed in the tuber. There is a high percentage of granules, which show the same size of about 12–18 μm diameter. This indicates that the tuber growth is completed. P. ahipa can produce 19–28% sugars in its root.

The protein content lies between 8 and 18%. The European market is economically highly interested in the protein content, mostly as feed for cattle. Protein content also may be interesting for the food industry, because about 80% of the protein is water-soluble and not extractable within a pH range of 2–10. The lipid content is very low, below 1%. Altogether, the tuber shows a very good nutritional composition. However, because the tuber contains a lot of water, the protein and energy concentration may be rated as being medium.

=== Seeds ===
The seeds of the Andean bean contain high protein concentrations. As an adaption to insect predators, ahipa plants accumulate canavanine in its seeds. This is highly toxic to some insects and can pose a significant problem in livestock foraging, especially if ahipa plants escaped into wild vegetation. The oil of the seeds has special properties, such as high palmitic acid and γ-tocopherol concentrations, as well as few linolenic acids. These aspects are of interest in the food industry.

== In culture ==
Today, the plant is still in use in small native communities in Bolivia and northern Argentina. The crop was never widely distributed which could have to do with the very specific climatic adaptions it exhibits. Another reason could be the acquisition of Latin America by the Spanish and Portuguese conquest, which had the general policy to destroy the traditional Andean agricultural systems. The local marketing of the Andean bean during the religious festival Corpus Christi indicates a relationship with ancient religious uses. Today, the production is restricted to a few local villages and farmers.
