= Popiah =

Chinese food often eaten at Ching Ming Festival

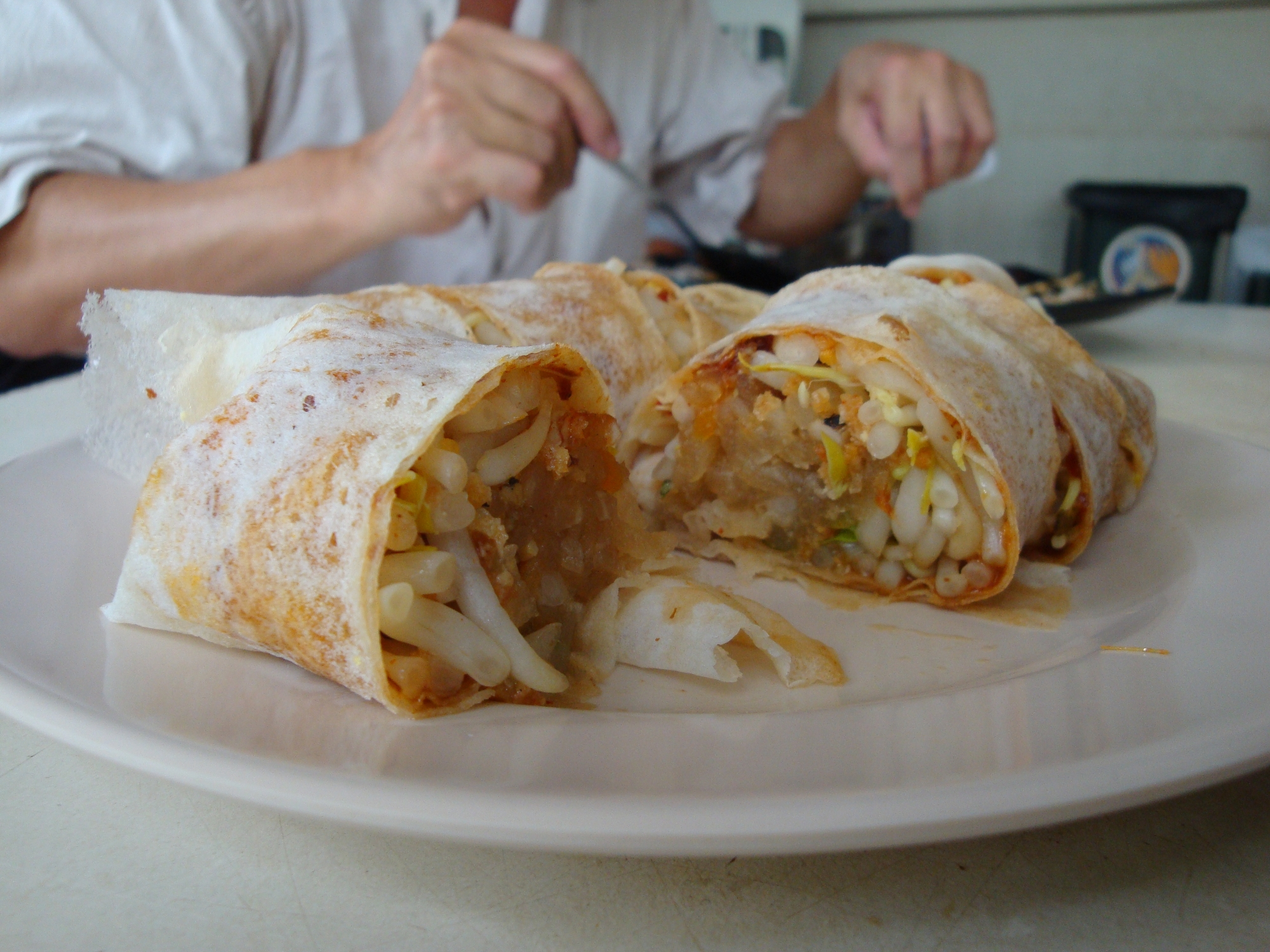
- A popiah roll with a filling of bean sprouts and other ingredients
- Alternative names: po̍h-piáⁿ
- Place of origin: Minnan, China
- Region or state: East Asia (Teochew and Hokkien-speaking communities), Southeast Asia
- Main ingredients: Popiah skin, bean sauce, filling of finely grated and steamed or stir-fried turnip, jicama, bean sprouts, French beans, lettuce leaves, grated carrots, Chinese sausage slices, thinly sliced fried tofu, chopped peanuts or peanut powder, fried shallots, and shredded omelette
- Variations: Lumpia, bò bía, ปอเปี๊ยะทอด popia thot
- Other information: Eaten during Qingming Festival

Popiah
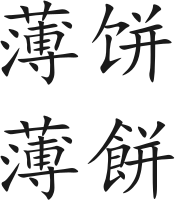
- Popiah in Simplified Chinese (top) and Traditional Chinese character (below)
- Traditional Chinese: 薄餅
- Simplified Chinese: 薄饼
- Hokkien POJ: po̍h-piáⁿ
Transcriptions
Standard Mandarin
- Hanyu Pinyin: bóbǐng
Southern Min
- Hokkien POJ: po̍h-piáⁿ

Alternative Chinese name
- Chinese: 潤餅
- Simplified Chinese: 润饼
- Hokkien POJ: jūn-piáⁿ or lūn-piáⁿ
Transcriptions
Standard Mandarin
- Hanyu Pinyin: rùnbǐng
Southern Min
- Hokkien POJ: jūn-piáⁿ or lūn-piáⁿ

Popiah (Pe̍h-ōe-jī: po̍h-piáⁿ, Teochew Peng'im: boh⁸ bian²) is a Fujianese/Teochew-style fresh spring roll filled with an assortment of fresh, dried, and cooked ingredients, eaten during the Qingming Festival and other celebratory occasions. The dish is made by the people and diaspora of Fujian province of China (in Quanzhou, Xiamen, and Zhangzhou), neighbouring Chaoshan district, and by the Teochew and Hoklo diaspora in various regions throughout Southeast Asia and in Taiwan (due to the majority of Taiwanese being Hoklo). The origin of popiah dates back to the 17th century.

== Etymology ==
In Teochew and Hokkien, popiah is pronounced as /poʔ˩piã˥˧/ (薄餅), which means "thin flatbread/cake". Depending on the regions in Fujian, it is also commonly referred to as /lun˩piã˥˧/ (潤餅), which is the etymological origin of "lumpia" in the Philippines and Indonesia. It is referred to as rùnbǐng (潤餅) or báobǐng (薄餅) in Mandarin, and also as bópíjuǎn (薄皮卷).

== Wrapper and fillings ==
A popiah "skin" (薄餅皮) is a soft, thin paper-like crêpe or pancake made from wheat flour. The method of producing the wrapper involves making an extremely wet and viscous dough. A ball of this dough is held to the right hand, then quickly "rubbed" (擦薄餅皮, Hokkien: chhat po̍h-piáⁿ phê, literally "to rub a popiah crepe") against a hot steel plate in a circular fashion, and lifted. Through this process, a very thin layer of the wet dough adheres to the plate and begins to cook. The upper surface of the crêpe is then usually cleaned of excess pieces of dough using the dough ball through a dabbing process. When the dough has been cooked to completion, it is peeled off from the hot steel plate before being removed. The rubbing is typically done over two or three plates at once, which allows the baker to continuously produce crepes and gives enough time for each crepe to be properly cooked.

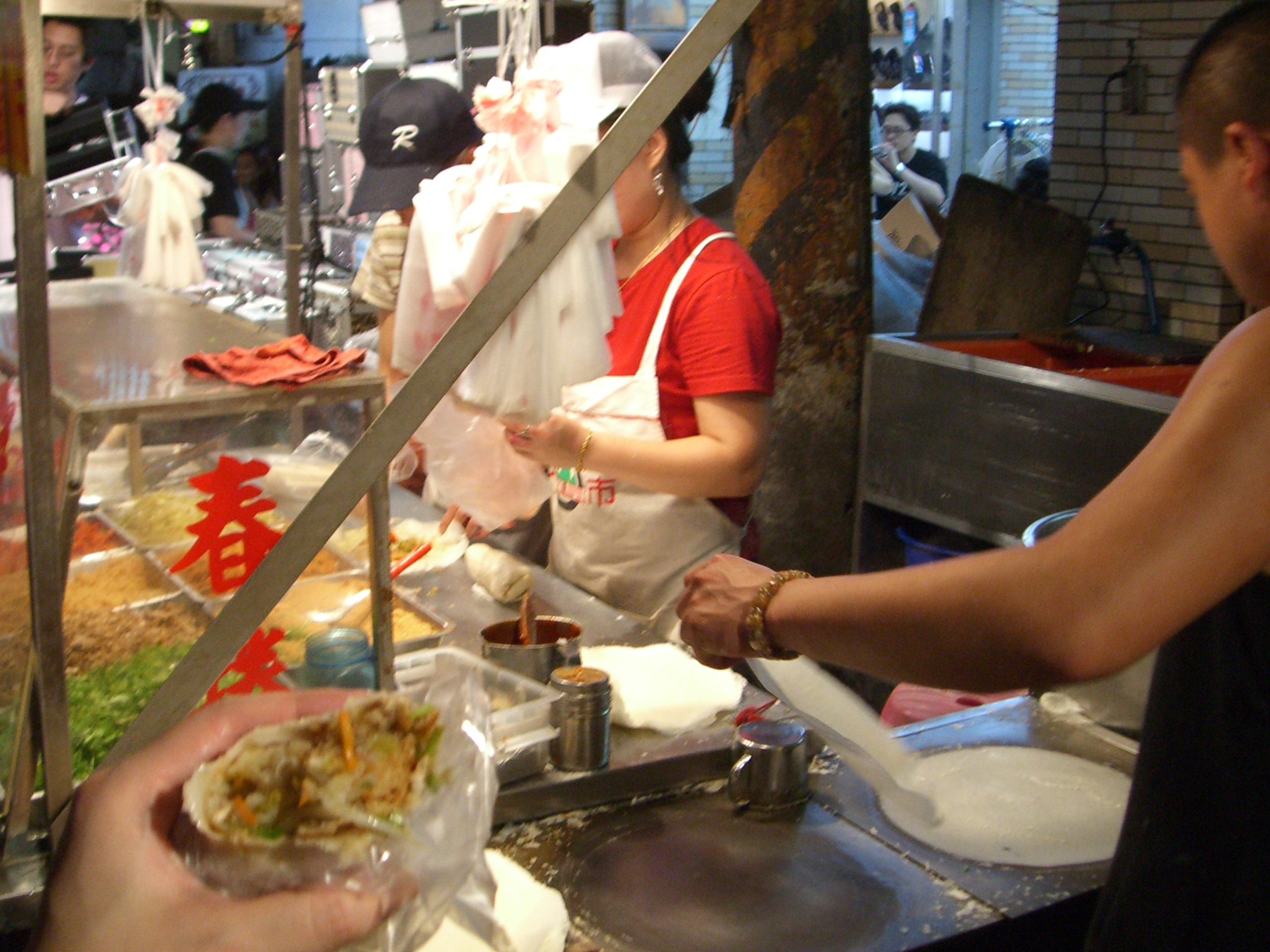
A popiah vendor in Keelung, Taiwan. Popiah crêpes are produced through "rubbing" (foreground) and then filled and rolled (background)

It is eaten in accompaniment with a sweet sauce (often a bean sauce), a blended soy sauce or hoisin sauce or a shrimp paste sauce (蝦膎, hae-ko, Pe̍h-ōe-jī: hê-ko, Tâi-lô: hê-kê), and optionally with hot chilli sauce before it is filled. The filling is mainly finely grated and steamed or stir-fried turnip, jicama (known locally as bangkuang, 芒光, Tâi-lô: bâng-kuang), which has been cooked with a combination of other ingredients such as bean sprouts, French beans, and lettuce leaves, depending on the individual vendor, along with grated carrots, slices of Chinese sausage, thinly sliced fried tofu, chopped peanuts or peanut powder, fried shallots, and shredded omelette. Other common variations of popiah include pork (lightly seasoned and stir-fried), shrimp or crab meat. Seaweed is often included in the Xiamen (Amoy) versions. Some hawkers in Malaysia and Singapore, especially in non-halal settings, will add fried pork lard. As a fresh spring roll, the popiah skin itself is not fried.

Two common ways of eating this are holding them like a burrito, which some prefer, while others cut the popiah roll into slices and pick them up with chopsticks. It requires some skill to pick the pieces up with chopsticks. Spoons are seldom provided at the establishments.

== Types ==
In China, Taiwan, Singapore and Malaysia there are "popiah parties" at home, where the ingredients are laid out and guests make their own popiah with proportions of ingredients to their own personal liking.

=== Taiwanese ===
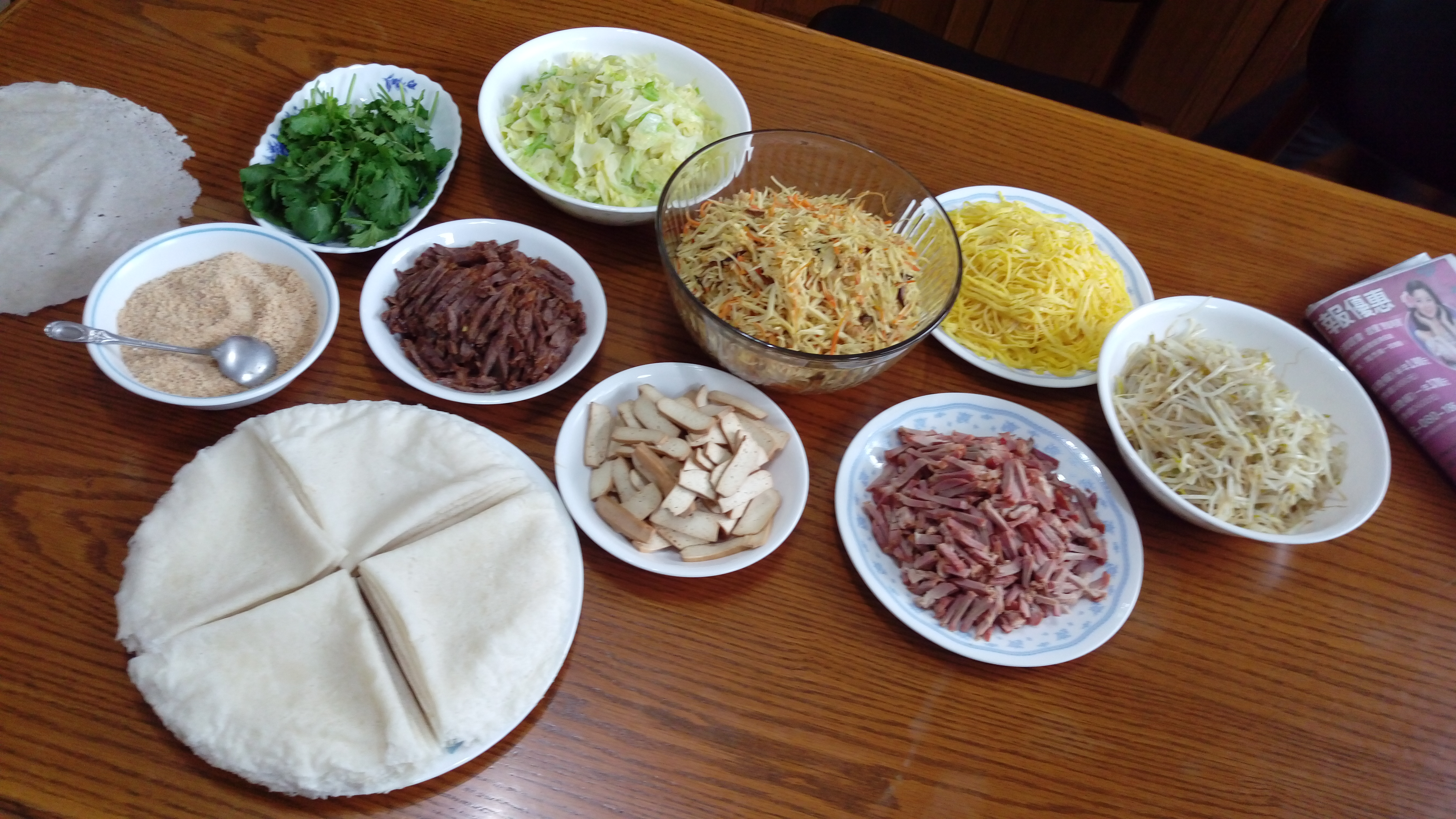
Ingredients for making a popiah in Taiwan

In Taiwan, popiah is called runbing (潤餅) in Mandarin, jūn-piánn(-kauh) in Taiwanese Hokkien.

The stuffing itself is quite diverse among different places. The basic stuffing includes vegetables that grow in spring, meat and thinly shredded omelette. In some places, they also add noodles, Chinese sausages, stewed vegetables instead of blanched ones, tofu, seafood, sticky rice, and so on.

Furthermore, the way of cooking the stuffing is very different as well. In northern Taiwan, the stuffing is flavoured, stir-fried, sometimes it goes with peanut powder, and the sauce is salty. In southern Taiwan, the popiah stuffing is water blanched without additional seasoning, and flavoured primarily with sugar and peanut powder. For people who live in southern Taiwan, the addition of sufficient sugar is key for popiah. Moreover, some people like to heat or steam the spring roll again after it is made.

Some food stalls serve popiah filled with ice cream. This is a sweet and savory food item - the ice cream is commonly pineapple, peanut and taro flavored, or these three flavors swirled together. The vendor will have a giant block of peanut candy nearby. They will shave this in front of people to create a bed of peanut shavings on the popiah skin. Then the three scoops of ice cream are placed on the bed. It is customary to add a piece of cilantro before the whole thing is wrapped up and handed out. Some people have dubbed it an "ice-cream burrito".

=== Southeast Asian ===
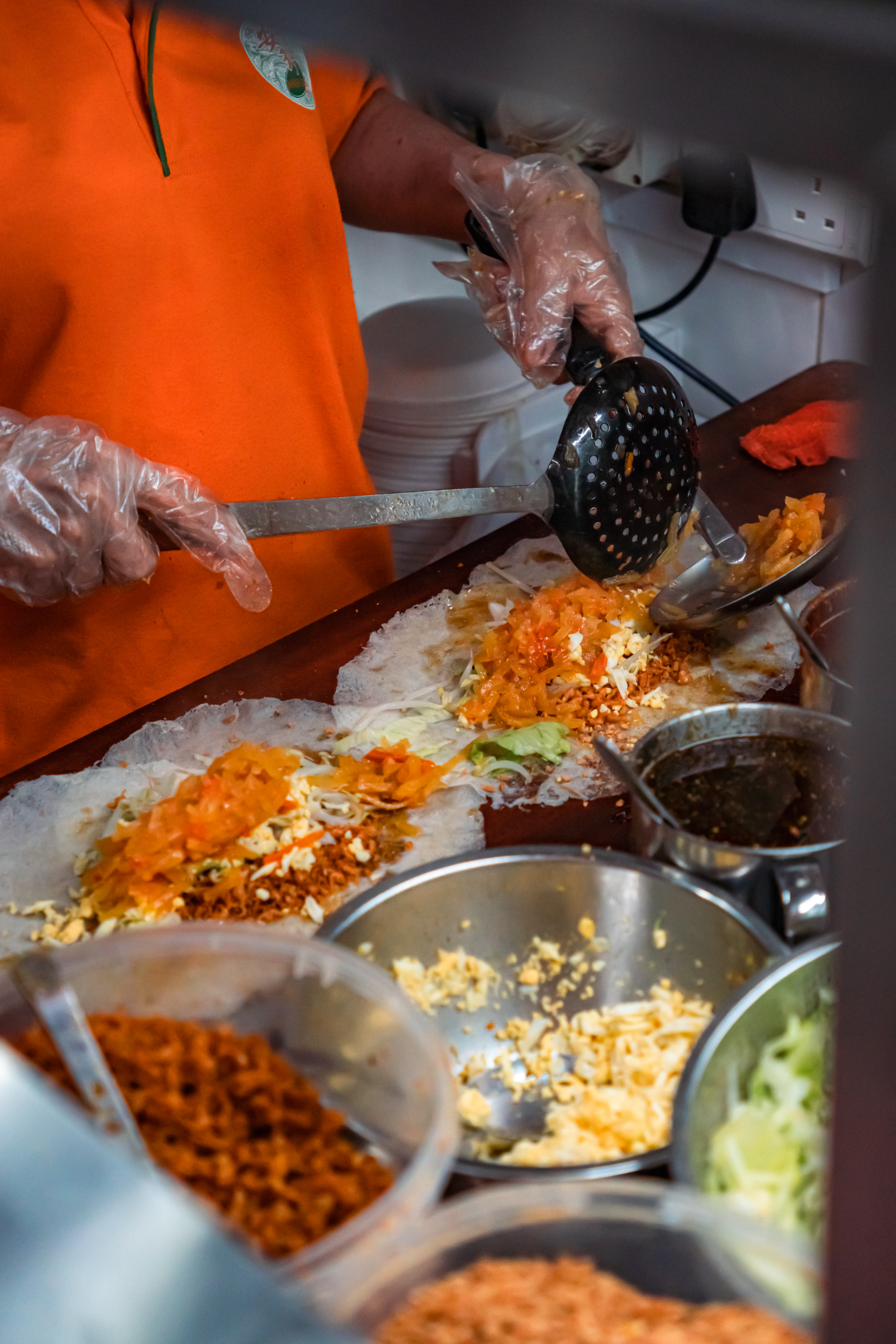
Making of popiah

In Malaysia and Singapore, popiah is part of Chinese cuisine of these two countries. However, in both countries, as well as in Brunei, popiah (especially the fried variant) is also popular as part of local street food. In Vietnam, bò bía is the Vietnamese variant of popiah, introduced by Teochew immigrants. It is common to see an old Teochew man or woman selling bò bía at their roadside stand. In Cambodian cuisine, popiah is known as num por pia (Khmer: នុំពពៀ). In Thai cuisine, two types of popia (Thai: เปาะเปี๊ยะ) are popular: popia sot (fresh spring roll) and popia thot (deep-fried spring roll). In addition, Thai cuisine has also incorporated the Vietnamese summer roll under the name kuaitiao lui suan (Thai: ก๋วยเตี๋ยวลุยสวน). While in Burma/Myanmar, it is known as kawpyan (ကော်ပြန့်). Similar foods in other cuisines include the Filipino lumpiang sariwa and the Indonesian Lumpia Basah spring rolls which are served with peanut sauce, etymologically derived from the Hokkien name Lum Pia. Majority of ethnic Chinese in both countries are of Hokkien origin.

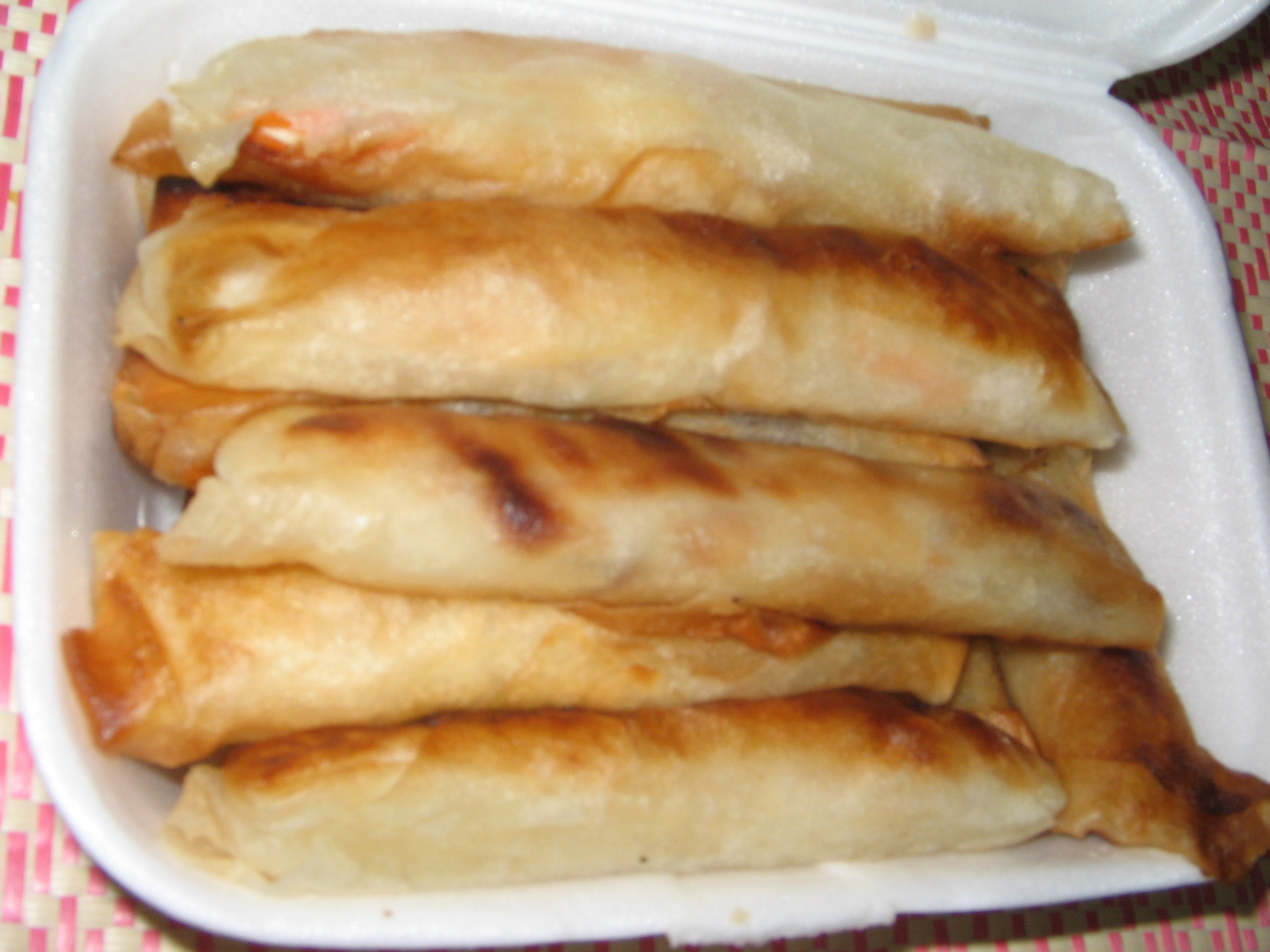
Fried popiah being sold in Malaysia

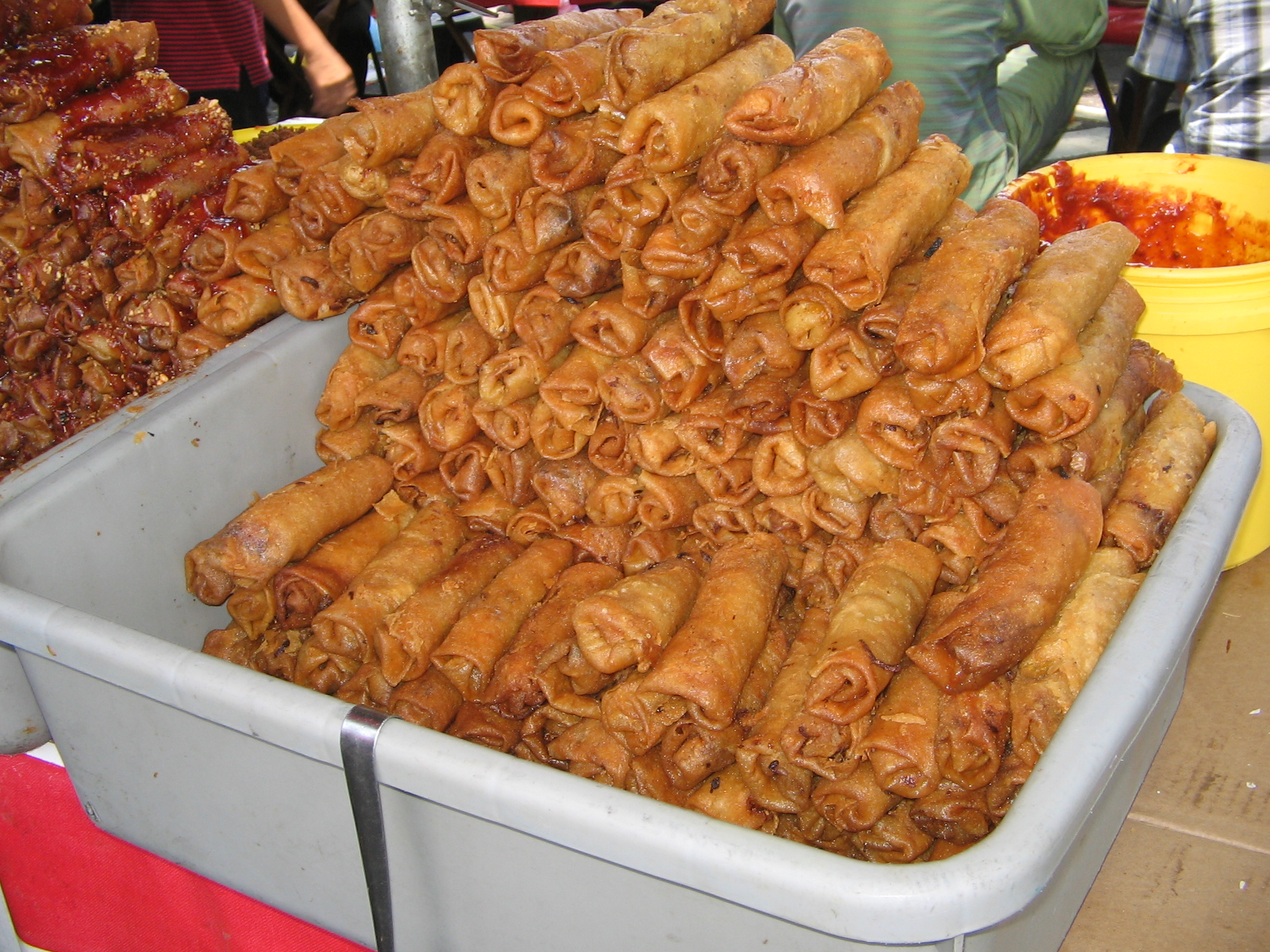
Hot and spicy fried popiah, popular in Malaysia. On the left side of the photo, the popiah is coated with heavy chili sauce.

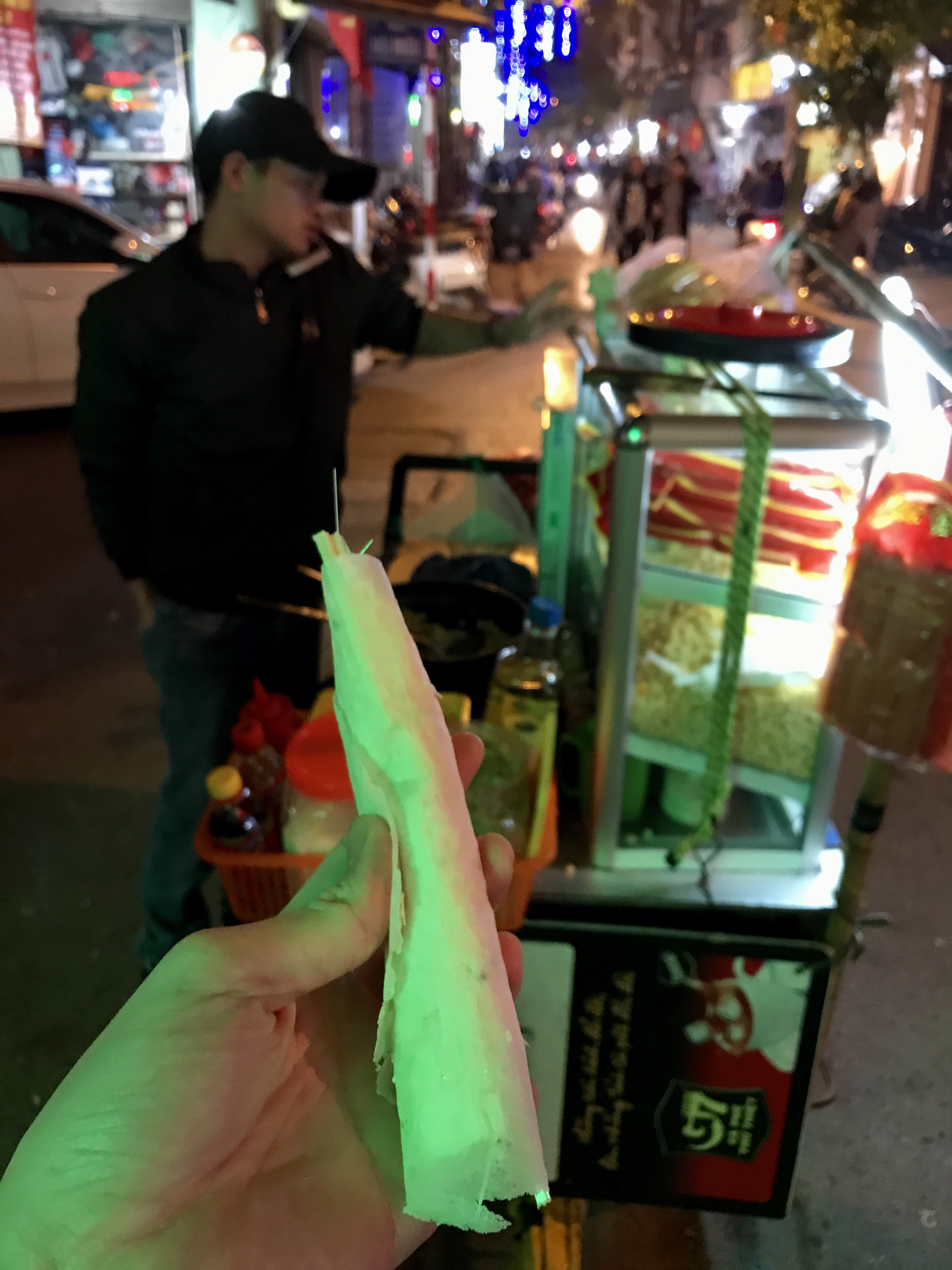
Sweet "Bò bía" sold at a street vendor in Hanoi, Vietnam

== See also ==
- Lumpia (the Philippines and Indonesia)
- Chinese pancake
- Burrito
- Fajitas
- Summer roll
