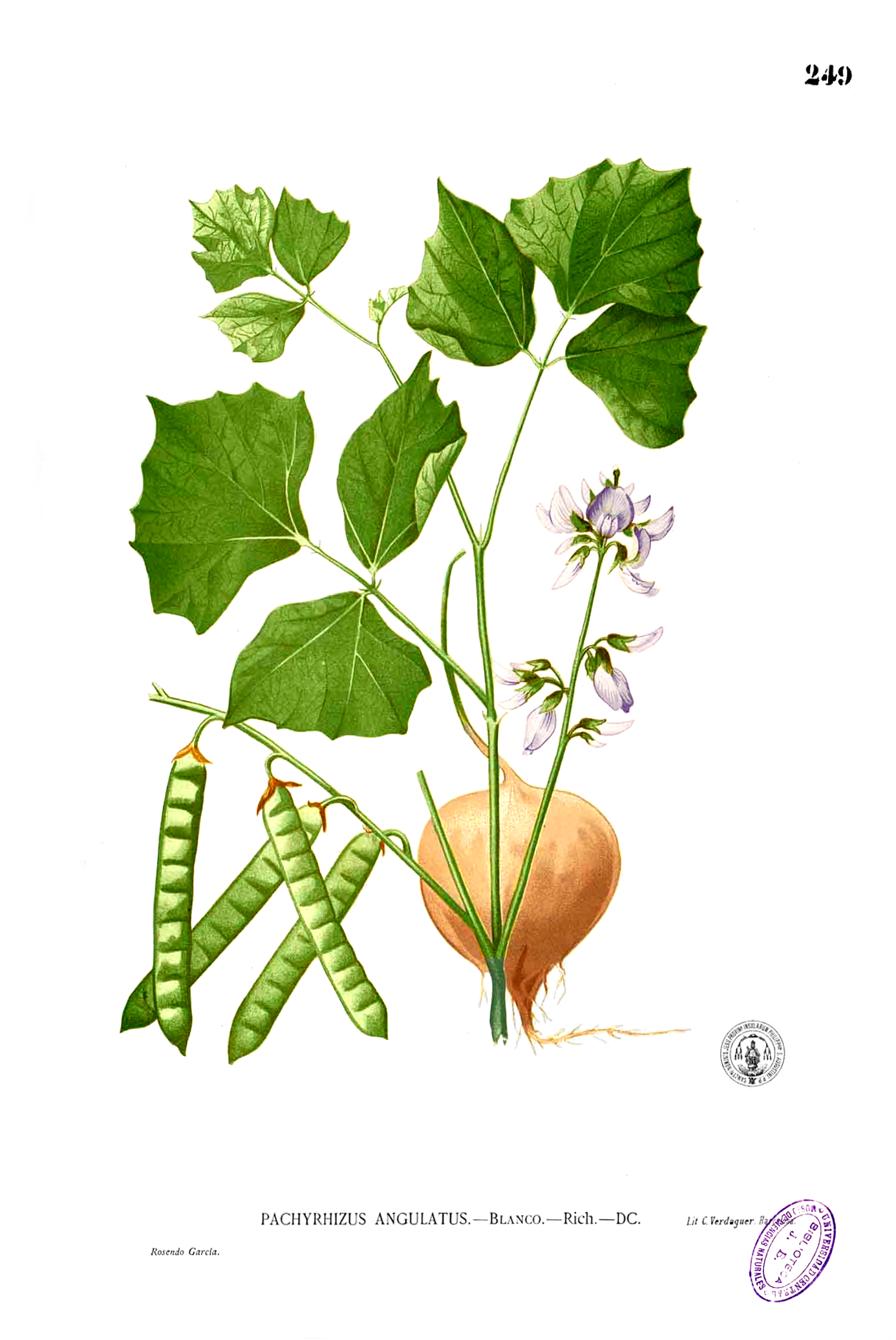

Scientific classification
- Kingdom: Plantae
- Clade: Tracheophytes
- Clade: Angiosperms
- Clade: Eudicots
- Clade: Rosids
- Order: Fabales
- Family: Fabaceae
- Subfamily: Faboideae
- Clade: Millettioids
- Tribe: Phaseoleae
- Subtribe: Glycininae
- Genus: Pachyrhizus; Rich. ex DC. (1826)

Species
- Pachyrhizus ahipa (Wedd.) Parodi; Pachyrhizus erosus (L.) Urb.; Pachyrhizus ferrugineus (Piper) M.Sørensen; Pachyrhizus panamensis R.T.Clausen; Pachyrhizus tuberosus (Lam.) Spreng.

Synonyms
- Cacara Rumph. ex Thouars (1806); Pachyrrhizos Spreng. (1827), orth. var.; Robynsia M.Martens & Galeotti (1843); Taeniocarpum Desv. (1826)

= Pachyrhizus =

Genus of legumes

Pachyrhizus is a genus of flowering plants in the legume family, Fabaceae. It includes five or species of herbs and subshrubs native to the tropical and subtropical Americas, ranging from northern Mexico to northwestern Argentina. Typical habitat is seasonally-dry tropical forest and thicket, often at forest margins, in scrub vegetation, and in open grassy areas. Plants in the genus grow from large, often edible taproots.

== Jícama ==
The jícama /ˈhɪkəmə/ or yam bean (P. erosus) is a vine widely grown for its large (10–15 cm diameter and up to 20 kg weight), spherical or elongated taproot. After removal of the thick, fibrous brown skin, the white flesh of the root can be eaten cooked or raw. Crisp, moist, and slightly sweet, the flesh draws comparison with that of the apple. The plant produces seeds that are comparable to lima beans, and that are sometimes eaten when young in places where the jicama is native. The mature seeds contain high levels of rotenone, a chemical used as an insecticide and pesticide. The remainder of the jícama plant is very poisonous.

Jícama comes from the New World; the name jícama is used in Central / South America. Today, pachyrhizus erosus is grown throughout Asia. In China, the root is known as cold potato; in Malaysia, sengkuang; in Indonesia, bengkoang; in the Philippines, singkamas; in Thailand, mankew. It is eaten raw and used in stir fried dishes.

== Pachyrhizus tuberosus ==
Goiteño, nupe, jacatupe or Amazonian yam bean (Pachyrhizus tuberosus) is an annual vine that is characterized by a wrapped and herbaceous stem and a ligneous base. It has white and lilac flowers, pods from 10 to 20 cm in length and beans with a high protein content (32%). Each plant has two or more tubercles from 15 to 25 cm in length that are succulent, sweet and rich in starch and protein (9%). They are consumed both raw and cooked. The leaves (20 to 24% protein) and pods are also edible. This plant prospers in acid soils in South America's tropical rainforests. It is cultivated by the native peoples of the Amazon rainforest.

== Ahipa ==
The ahipa, ajipa, or Andean yam bean (Pachyrhizus ahipa) is very similar to the jicama and goitenyo in characteristics and uses. Unlike the jícama, it is not a vine and it grows up 2000 m above sea level in the highest Bolivian mountains. The root is smaller and more elongated. It is little known outside of the Andes, where it is mostly grown for personal or local consumption. In the 19th century, British scientists introduced ahipa to the West Indies, where it is also enjoyed by the residents of those islands.

All three above Pachyrhizus species are popular cultivated varieties, mainly jicama or P. erosus, which is common in the US as imported jicama, while another species, P. palmatilobus, is less agreeable in taste.
