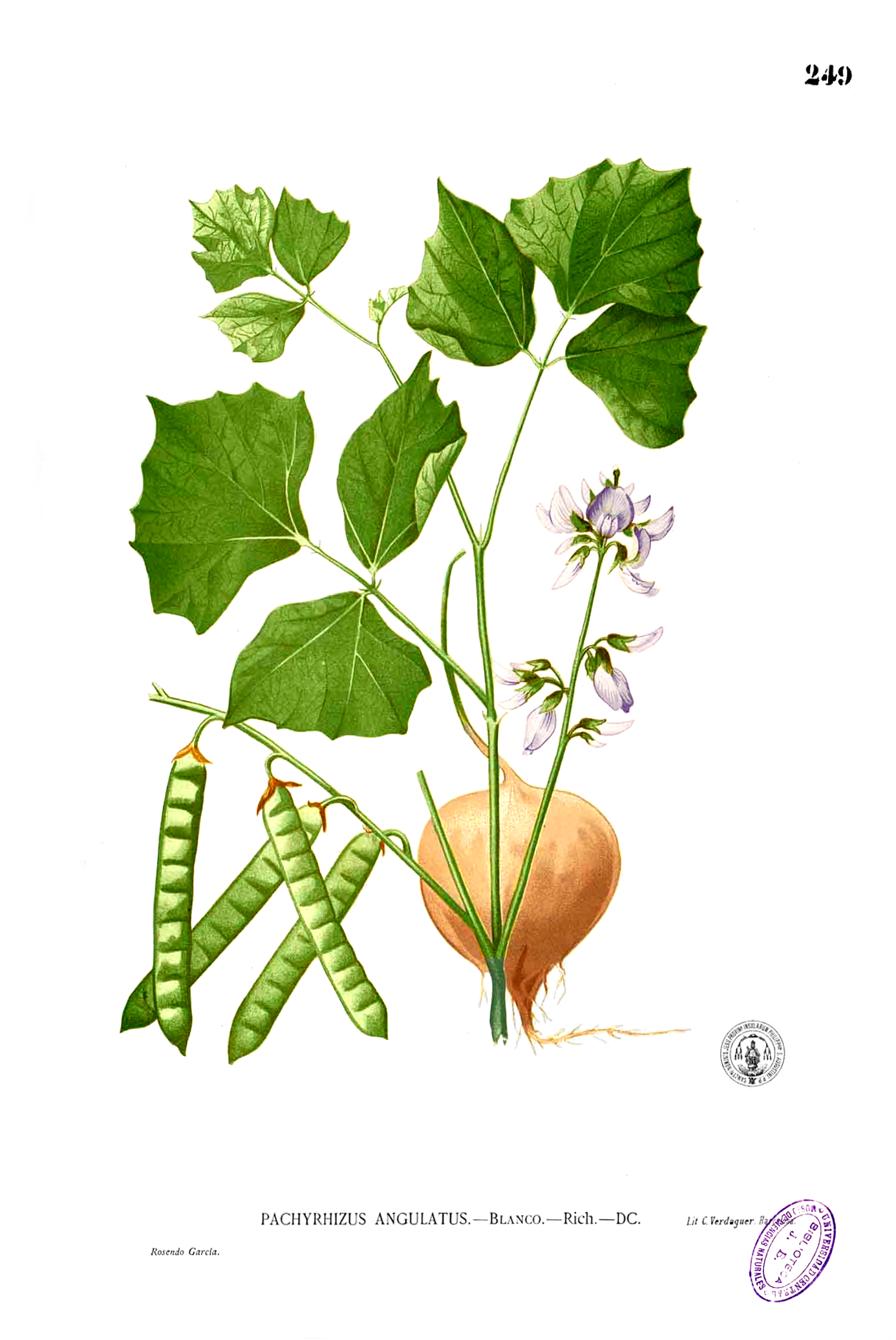

Scientific classification
- Kingdom: Plantae
- Clade: Tracheophytes
- Clade: Angiosperms
- Clade: Eudicots
- Clade: Rosids
- Order: Fabales
- Family: Fabaceae
- Subfamily: Faboideae
- Genus: Pachyrhizus
- Species: P. erosus

Binomial name
- Pachyrhizus erosus (L.) Urb.

= Pachyrhizus erosus =

Species of legume

Pachyrhizus erosus, commonly known as jícama (/ˈhɪkəmə/ or /dʒɪˈkɑːmə/; Spanish: jícama [ˈxikama]; from Nahuatl languages: xīcamatl [ʃiːˈkamatɬ]) or Mexican turnip, is a native Mesoamerican vine, although the name jícama most commonly refers to the plant's edible tuberous root. It is in the pea family (Fabaceae). Pachyrhizus tuberosus and Pachyrhizus ahipa are the other two cultivated species in the genus. The naming of this group of edible plants can sometimes be confusing, with much overlap of similar, or the same, common names.

Flowers, either blue or white, and pods similar to peas, are produced on fully developed plants. Several species of Pachyrhizus are known as jícama, but the one found in many markets is P. erosus. The two cultivated forms of P. erosus are jícama de agua and jícama de leche, both named for the consistency of their juice. The leche form has an elongated root and milky juice, while the agua form has a top-shaped to oblate root and a more watery, translucent juice and is the preferred form for the market.

== Description ==
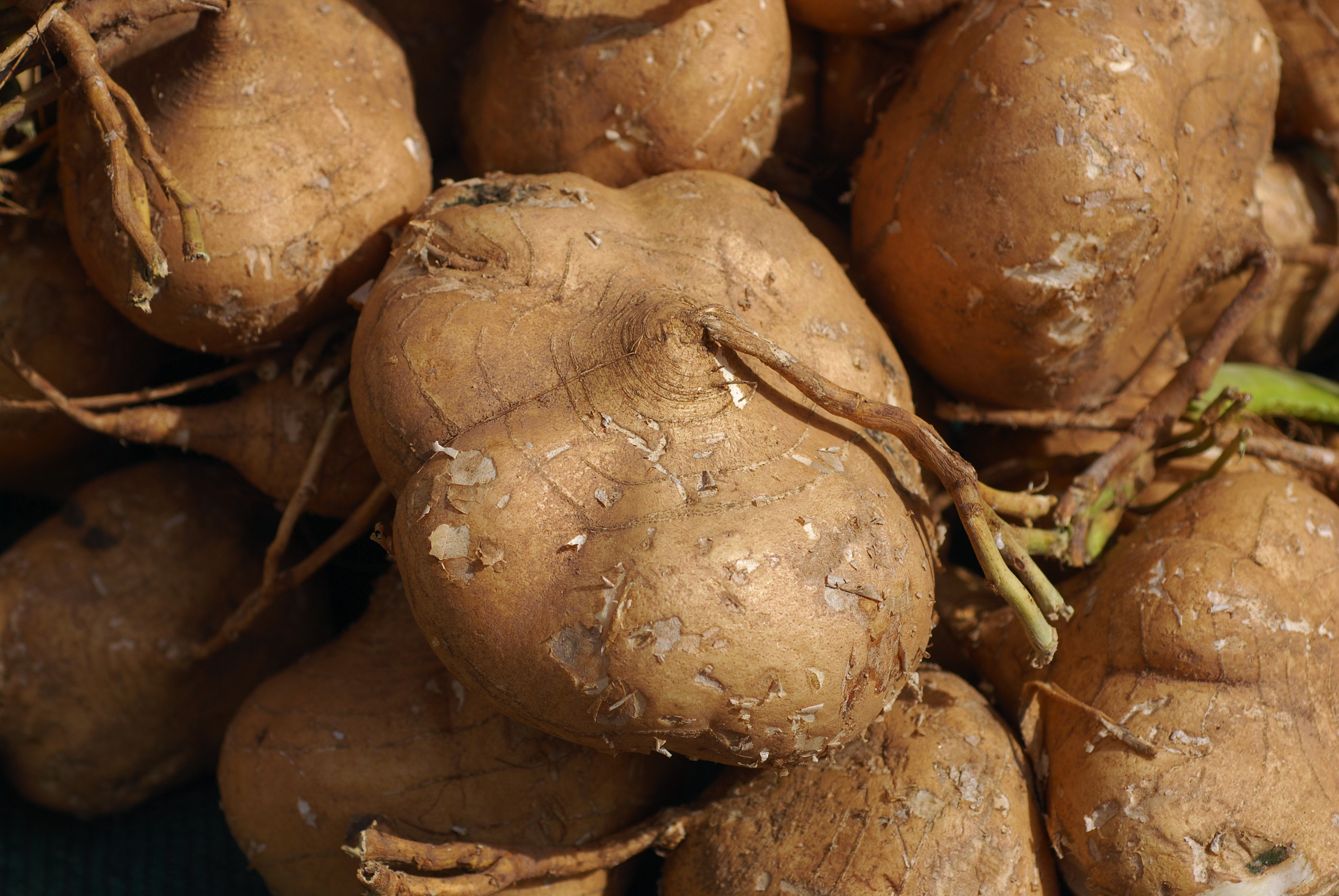
Fresh jícama for sale at a farmers' market

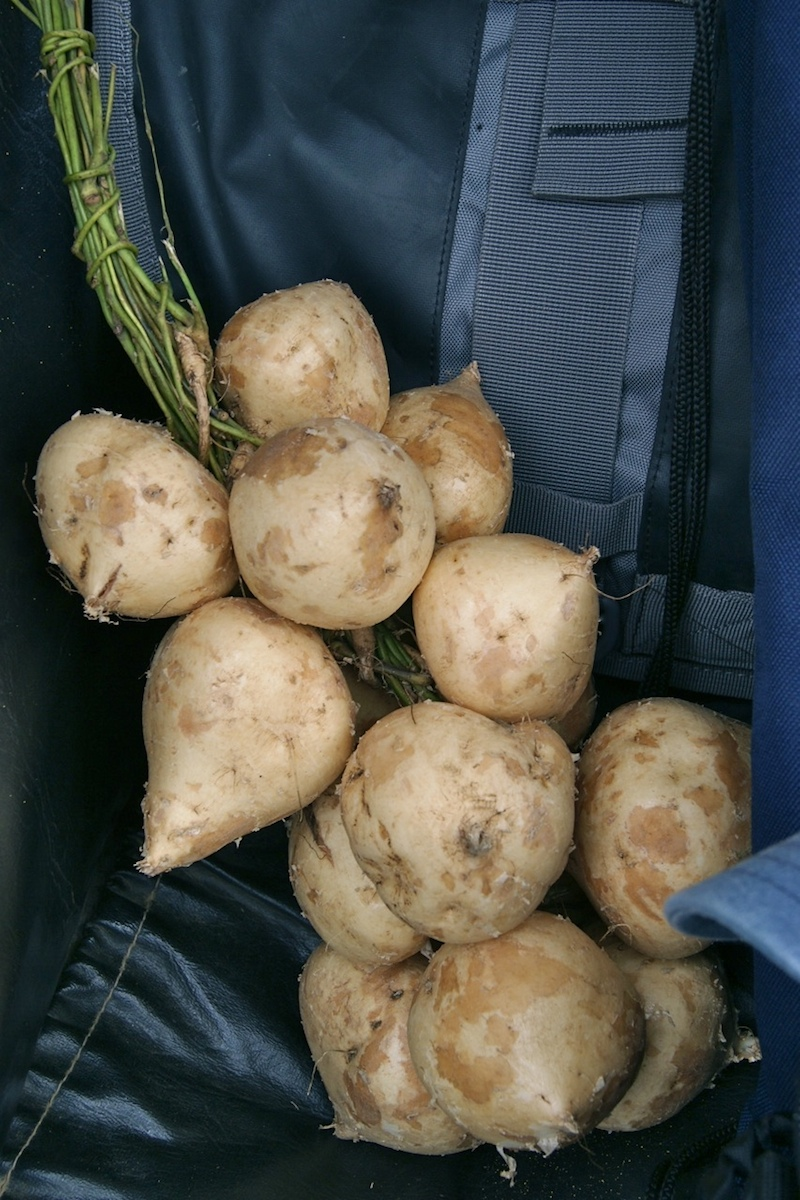
Jícama

The jícama vine can reach a height of 4–5 metres (13–16 feet) given suitable support. Its root can attain lengths up to 2 m (6 1/2 ft) and weigh up to 20 kilograms (44 pounds). The heaviest jícama root ever recorded weighed 23 kg (51 lb) and was found in 2010 in the Philippines. Jícama is frost-tender and requires nine months without frost for a good harvest of large tubers or to grow it commercially. It is worth growing in cooler areas that have at least five months without frost, as it will still produce tubers, but they will be smaller. Warm, temperate areas with at least five months without frost can start seed eight to ten weeks before the last spring frost. Bottom heat is recommended, as the seeds require warm temperatures to germinate, so the pots will need to be kept in a warm place. Jícama is unsuitable for areas with a short growing season unless cultured in a greenhouse. Growers in tropical areas can sow seed at any time of the year. Those in subtropical areas should sow seeds once the soil has warmed in the spring.

== Taxonomy ==
Other names for jícama include Mexican potato, ahipa, saa got, Chinese potato, and sweet turnip. In Ecuador and Peru, the name jícama is used for the unrelated yacón or Peruvian ground apple, a sunflower-family plant whose tubers are also used as food.

== History ==
The jícama originated in Mexico and Central America. It has been found at archaeological sites in Peru dating to 3000 BC. In the 17th century, the jícama was introduced to Asia by the Spanish.

=== Spread to Asia ===
Spaniards spread the cultivation of jícama from Mexico to the Philippines (where it is known as singkamas, from Nahuatl xicamatl), from there it went to China and other parts of Southeast Asia, where notable uses of raw jícama include popiah, bola-bola (meatballs) and fresh lumpia in the Philippines, and salads in Indonesia, Singapore, and Malaysia such as yusheng and rojak.

In the Philippines, it is usually eaten fresh with condiments, such as rice vinegar and sprinkled with salt or with bagoong (shrimp paste). It is also used as an extender for the Filipino versions of siomai and meatballs. In Malay, it is known as ubi sengkuang. In Indonesia, jícama is known as bengkuang. This root crop is also known by people in Sumatra and Java, and eaten at fresh fruit bars or mixed in the rojak (a kind of spicy fruit salad). Padang, the capital of West Sumatra province, is nicknamed "the city of bengkuang". Local people might have thought that this jícama is the "indigenous crop" of Padang. The crop has been grown everywhere in this city and has become a part of their culture.

== Toxicity ==
In contrast to the root, the remainder of the plant is very poisonous; the seeds contain the toxin rotenone, which is used to poison insects and fish. Mature seeds, flowers, and beans have a high rotenone content. Commercial jícama cultivation considered using them as an insecticide source.

== Uses ==
=== Culinary ===
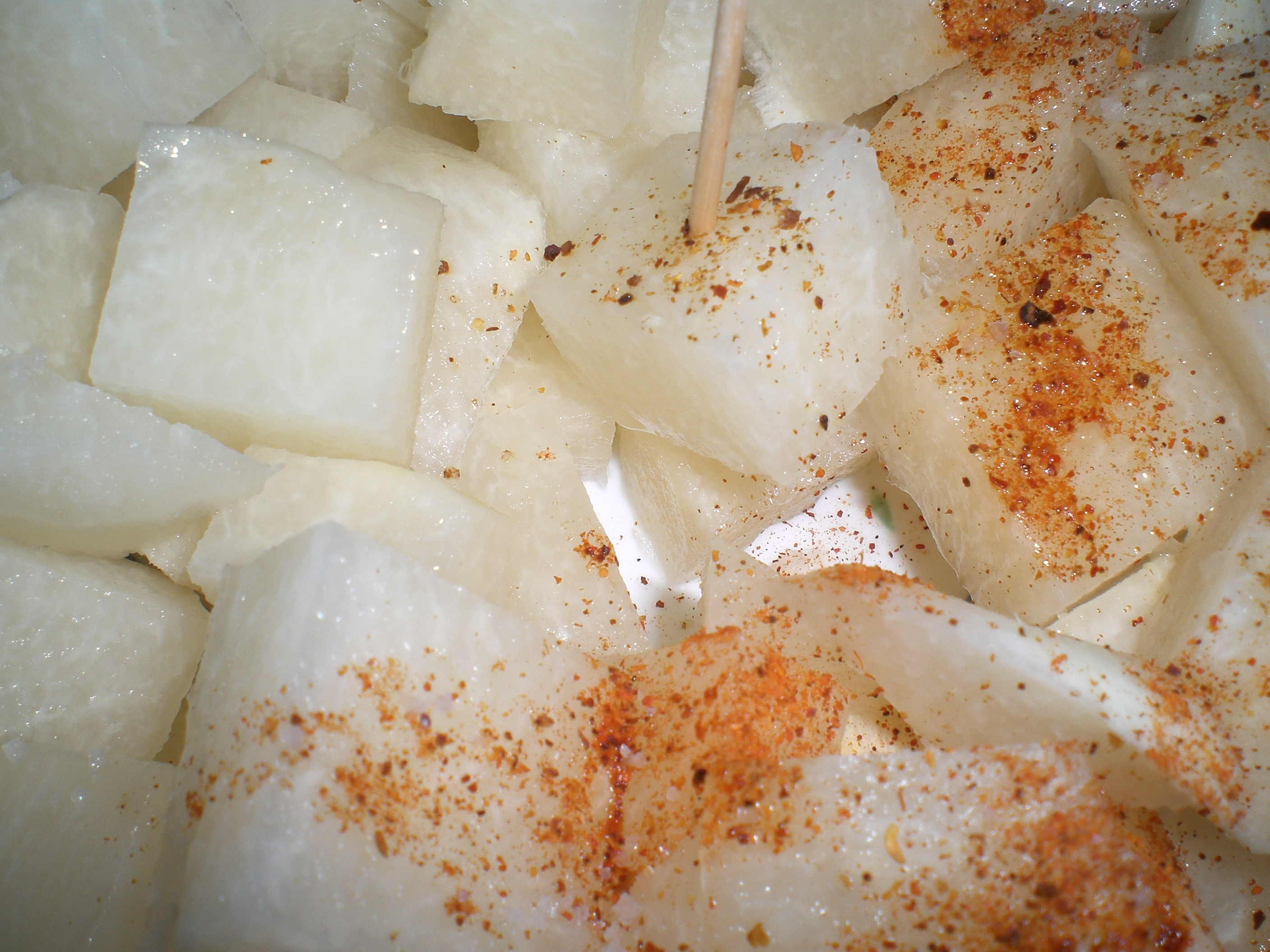
Diced fresh jícama, seasoned with Tajín chili powder

The root's exterior is yellow and papery, while its inside is creamy white with a crisp texture that resembles raw potato or pear. The flavor is sweet and starchy, reminiscent of some apples or raw green beans. It is usually eaten raw, sometimes with salt, lemon or lime juice, alguashte, and/or chili powder. It is also often paired with cilantro, ginger, lemon, lime, orange, red onion, salsa, sesame oil, grilled fish, and soy sauce. It can be cut into thin wedges and dipped in salsa or can be cooked in soups and stir-fried dishes. In Mexico, it is popular in salads, fresh fruit combinations, fruit bars, soups, and other cooked dishes. The exterior of the seed pods is edible and can be used in cooking; for example, the Ilocano dish bunga ng singkamas is cooked in a stew as the main ingredient.

Flour can be made from the tubers by slicing, drying, and grinding them.

=== Nutrition ===
Jícama, raw
Nutritional value per 100 g (3.5 oz)
- Energy: 159 kJ (38 kcal)
- Carbohydrates: 8.82 g
- Sugars: 1.8 g
- Dietary fiber: 4.9 g
- Fat: 0.09 g
- Protein: 0.72 g
Vitamins and minerals
Vitamins	Quantity %DV^{†}
Thiamine (B1)	2% 0.02 mg
Riboflavin (B2)	2% 0.029 mg
Niacin (B3)	1% 0.2 mg
Pantothenic acid (B5)	3% 0.135 mg
Vitamin B6	2% 0.042 mg
Folate (B9)	3% 12 μg
Choline	2% 13.6 mg
Vitamin C	22% 20.2 mg
Minerals	Quantity %DV^{†}
Calcium	1% 12 mg
Iron	3% 0.6 mg
Magnesium	3% 12 mg
Manganese	3% 0.06 mg
Phosphorus	1% 18 mg
Potassium	5% 150 mg
Sodium	0% 4 mg
Zinc	1% 0.16 mg
- Other constituents: Quantity
- Water: 90 g
- Link to USDA Database entry
- ^{†}Percentages estimated using US recommendations for adults, except for potassium, which is estimated based on expert recommendation from the National Academies.

Raw jícama is 90% water, 9% carbohydrates, 1% protein, and contains negligible fat (table). In a 100-gram (3.5 oz) reference amount, it supplies 38 calories and is a rich source of vitamin C, with no other micronutrients in significant content (table).

=== Storage ===
Jícama should be stored dry, between 12.5 and 15 °C (54.5 and 59.0 °F). The jícama root will stay fresh for up to 4 months within this temperature range. Whole jícama can also be stored in a refrigerator to keep it free from moisture for up to 3 weeks. Storing at colder temperatures can discolor, damage the root, and degrade its texture. The root will keep fresh for one week after being sliced and should be wrapped and refrigerated for storage in this state.
