= Urceola =

Urceola may refer to:

- Urceola (fungus), Quél. 1886, a genus of fungi in the order Helotiales
- Urceola (plant), Roxb. 1799, a genus of plants in the family Apocynaceae

== See also ==
- Urceolate, shaped like an urn or pitcher
