= Canh chua =

Vietnamese sour soup dish

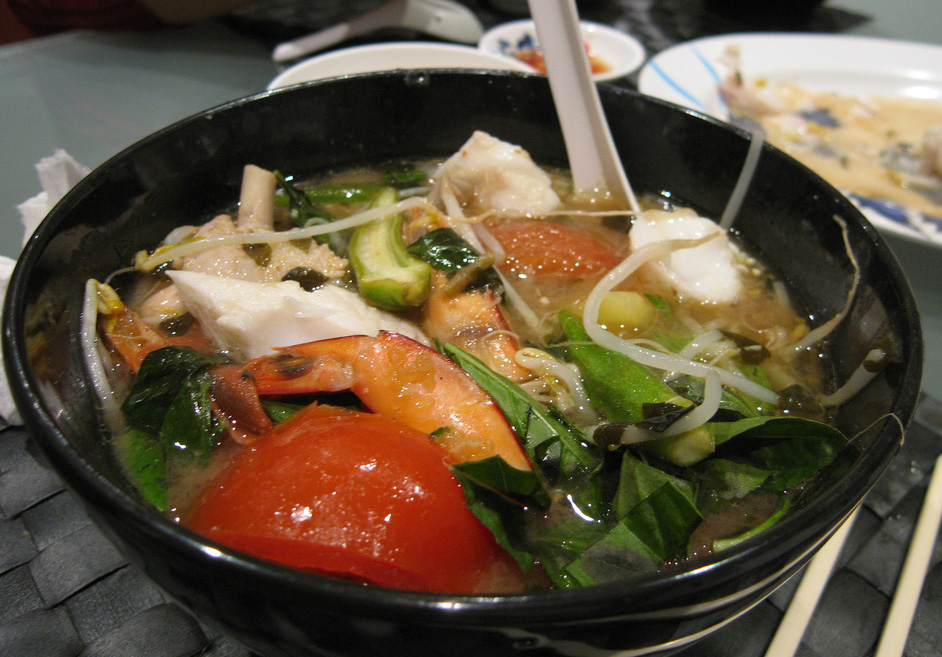
- A bowl of Canh chua
- Type: Soup
- Place of origin: Vietnam
- Region or state: Mekong Delta
- Main ingredients: Fish, pineapple, tomatoes, sometimes other vegetables, bean sprouts, tamarind-flavored broth
- Similar dishes: Samlor machu

Canh chua (Vietnamese: [kajŋ̟ cuə], sour soup) is a Vietnamese sour soup indigenous to the Mekong Delta region of Southern Vietnam (Central Vietnam also have their own canh chua). It is typically made with fish from the Mekong River Delta, pineapple, tomatoes (and sometimes also other vegetables such as ladyfingers (đậu bắp) or stems of giant elephant ears (dọc mùng)), and bean sprouts, in a tamarind-flavored broth. It is garnished with the lemony-scented herb ngò gai (Limnophila aromatica), caramelized garlic, and chopped scallions, as well as other herbs, according to the specific variety of canh chua; these other herbs may include rau răm (Vietnamese coriander), ngò om (long coriander), and rau quế (Thai basil). It can be served alone, with white rice, or with rice vermicelli. Variations can include prawns, squid, spare ribs, fish cakes and quail eggs.

The sour taste of the soup comes from tamarind, which is mixed with a small amount of hot water; the mixture is then stirred for a few moments to release all the essence, and the liquid (minus the tamarind seeds and other solids, which are discarded) is then added to the soup.

When made in style of a hot pot, canh chua is called lẩu canh chua.

== Varieties ==
- Canh chua me - made with tamarind; includes most varieties of canh chua
  - Canh chua me đất or canh chua rau nhút - made with water mimosa (Neptunia oleracea)
- Canh chua cá - made with fish
  - Canh chua đầu cá - made with fish heads
  - Canh chua cá lóc - made with snakehead fish
  - Canh chua cá bông lau - made with Pangasius krempfi catfish
  - Canh chua cá lăng - made with Hemibagrus catfish
  - Canh chua cá ngát - made with Plotosus catfish
  - Canh chua cá trê - made with airbreathing catfish
  - Canh chua cá linh bông so đũa - made with mud carp and Sesbania grandiflora flowers
  - Canh chua lá giang cá kèo - made with Urceola polymorpha leaves and mudskipper fish in the genus Apocryptes
  - Canh chua lươn - made with eel
  - Canh chua cá hồi - made with salmon
  - Canh cải chua cá - made with pickled mustard greens and fish
- Canh chua tôm - made with shrimp
  - Canh chua tôm rau muống or canh chua rau muống nấu tôm - made with shrimp and water spinach (Ipomoea aquatica)
  - Canh chua thơm nấu tép or canh chua thơm nấu với tép - made with pineapple and small shrimp
- Canh chua gà - made with chicken
  - Canh chua lá giang gà or canh chua gà lá giang - made with chicken and Aganonerion polymorphum leaves
  - Canh chua lá giang cá kèo - made with Urceola polymorpha leaves and mudskipper fish in the genus Apocryptes
- Canh chua rau muống - made with water spinach (Ipomoea aquatica)
  - Canh chua tôm rau muống or canh chua rau muống nấu tôm - made with water spinach (Ipomoea aquatica) and shrimp
- Canh chua chay - vegetarian
  - Canh chua đậu hũ - made with tofu
- Canh chua măng - made with pickled bamboo shoots
- Canh cải chua - made with pickled mustard greens
  - Canh cải chua thịt bằm - made with pickled mustard greens and ground pork
  - Canh cải chua sườn non - made with pickled mustard greens and baby back pork ribs
  - Canh cải chua cá - made with pickled mustard greens and fish
  - Canh cải chua ruột non or canh cải chua lòng heo - made with pickled mustard greens and pork intestines
  - Canh cải chua nấu với bắp bò - made with pickled mustard greens and beef shank
- Canh chua Thái or canh chua Thái Lan - an adaptation of Thai tom yum

== See also ==
- List of fish dishes

== See also ==
- Samlar machu
- Hot and sour soup
- Hot pot
- Vietnamese cuisine
- Penang Asam Laksa
