= Mắm cáy =

Vietnamese fish sauce

- Type: Condiment
- Place of origin: Vietnam
- Main ingredients: Fermented crab
- Similar dishes: Mắm tôm

Mắm cáy is a type of fermented fish sauce made from the cáy, a small crab primarily found along the coastal regions of Vietnam. Mắm cáy has a reddish-brown color and a distinctive flavor, and it is a rustic dish from the Red River Delta.

Many northern localities in Vietnam are famous for this type of sauce, including Hải Phòng, Hải Dương, Quảng Ninh, Thanh Hoá, Thái Bình, Hà Nam, Phú Thọ... is considered a unique feature of Vietnamese cuisine.

== Dishes using Mắm cáy ==
Mắm cáy can be used as a seasoning in soups with various leafy greens or mixed with minced garlic, chili, monosodium glutamate, and lime juice to create a dipping sauce for boiled animal and plant dishes, salads, or pickles, or it can be eaten directly with rice. The most popular uses include:

- Dipping boiled vegetables: The most common use of mắm cáy is as a dipping sauce for cooked vegetables such as (water spinach, sweet potato leaves, amaranth, ...), pickled vegetables, and salted eggplants dipped in mắm cáy.
- Bún mắm cáy: Noodles served with mắm cáy, boiled pork belly, Vietnamese pork sausage, and some Vietnamese mint.
