= Katong laksa =

Singaporean noodle dish

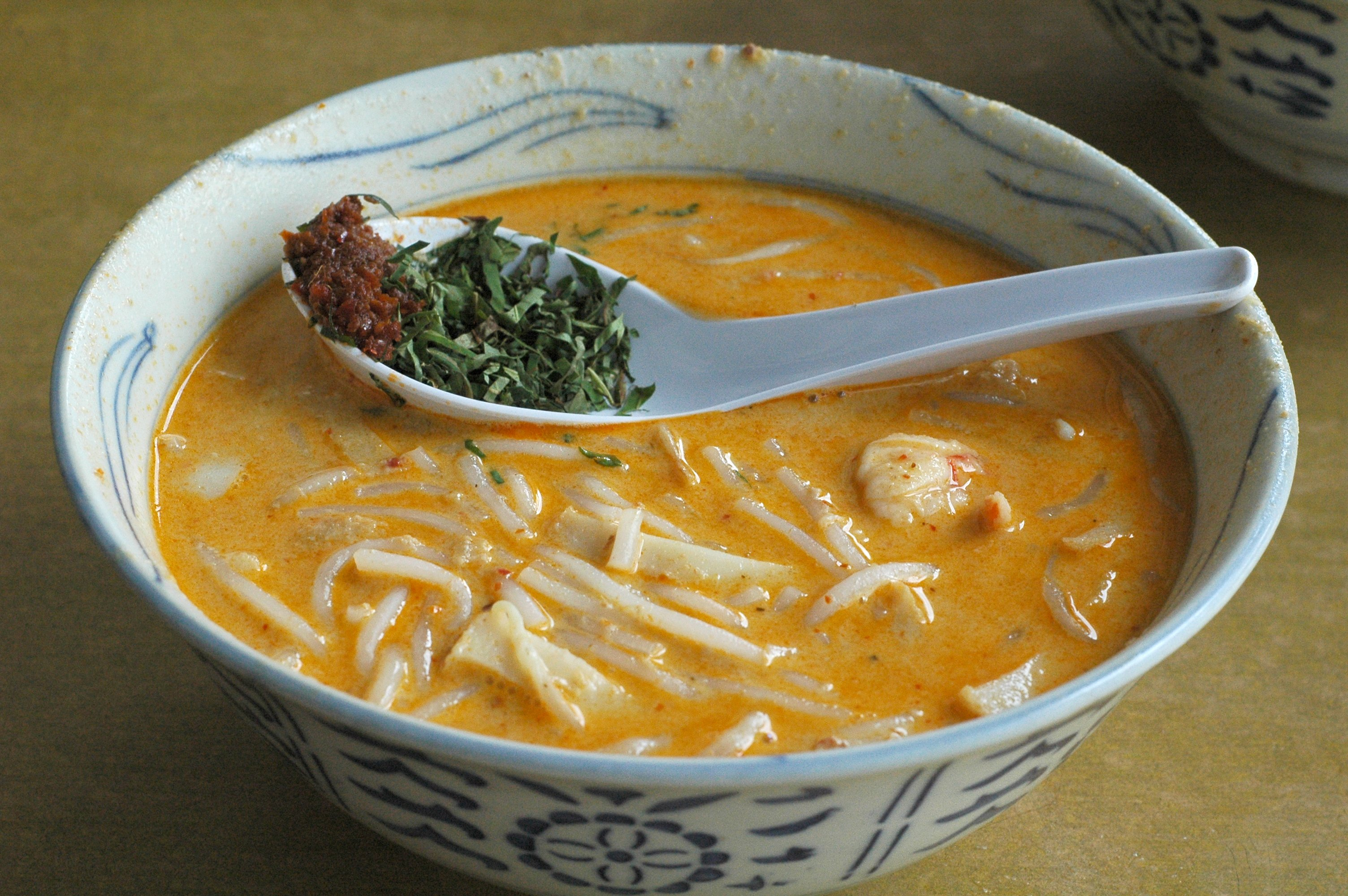
- Course: Main course
- Place of origin: Singapore
- Created by: Peranakans
- Serving temperature: Hot
- Main ingredients: Coconut milk, rice noodles, fried tau pok (fried tofu puffs), chili, dried shrimp, prawns, laksa leaf, and fish cake

Katong laksa is a variant of laksa lemak inspired by the Peranakans who live in the precinct of Katong in Singapore. It has an orange-yellow-coloured spicy soup stock, flavoured with coconut milk and dried shrimp, topped with ingredients like cockles, prawns and fish cake. The defining feature of Katong laksa is that the entire dish can be eaten with a spoon alone, without chopsticks or a fork, as the noodles are normally cut up into smaller pieces.

== Origin ==
The term "laksa" may have derived from the Chinese word 辣沙 (Cantonese: [làːt.sáː]), meaning "spicy sand" due to the ground dried shrimp which give a sandy or gritty texture to the sauce. The name "katong" was used to refer to an exotic species of sea turtle that has since gone extinct. It can also mean the rippling effect of the sea mirage when looking at a shoreline. Katong is a residential precinct located in the estate of Marine Parade in central Singapore. Katong laksa was so named due to its origins in the area.

The dish was first popularised by brothers Ng Juat Swee, also known as "Janggut", and Ng Chwee Seng, who started hawking Peranakan-style laksa on the streets in the 1940s but moved to a stall in the Hock Tong Hin coffee shop at 49 East Coast Road in 1950. In 1963, the stall was registered under the name "Marine Parade Laksa".

=== The Katong laksa war ===
In 1998, the Ngs were forced out by rising rents, with Nancy Lim (later Nancy Koh) opening 328 Laksa at the same location. Janggut's niece Ng Sway Hong and nephew Ng Kok Soon opened Janggut Laksa at 57 East Coast Road. A year later, Lim was evicted, moving 328 Laksa just down the street to 51 East Coast Rd, while 49 East Coast Rd's landlord Mrs Teo opened a new shop called Famous 49 Laksa.

By 1999, the "Katong laksa war" was in full swing, with five competing laksa shops along the same stretch of East Coast Road, many of which had names with “Katong laksa” in it.

As of 2025, Famous 49 Laksa remains at 49 East Coast Road, 328 Katong Laksa remains at 51 East Coast Road, and Janggut Laksa is now across the street in Roxy Square at 50 East Coast Road.

== See also ==
- List of noodle dishes
- Rice noodles
- Singaporean cuisine
