= Curry mee =

Southeast Asian noodle dish

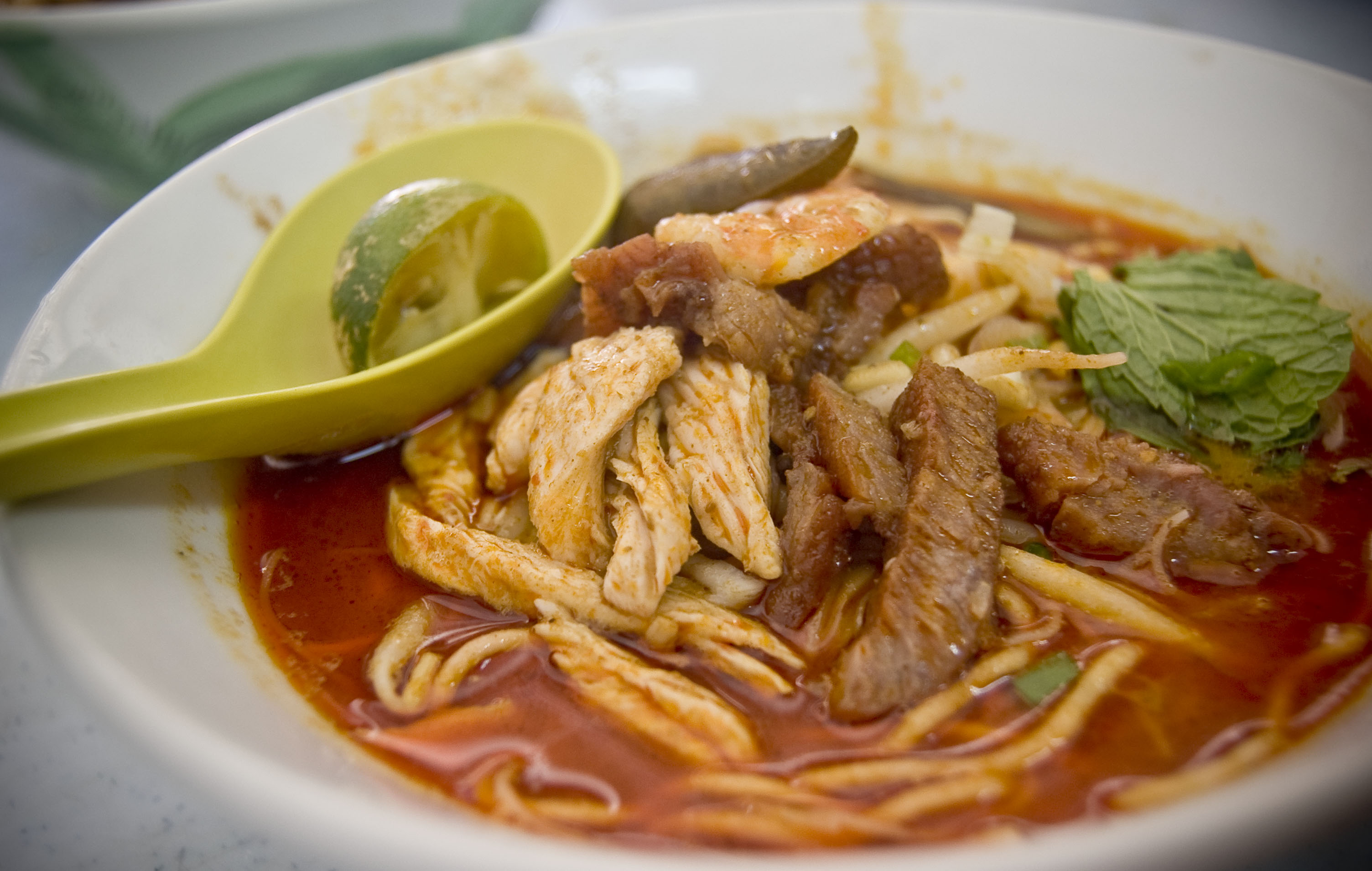
- Alternative names: mie kari
- Type: Noodle soup
- Region or state: Malaysia
- Associated cuisine: Malaysia
- Main ingredients: Noodles, sambal (chilli paste), coconut milk, herbs

Curry mee (Note: mi kari; simplified Chinese: 咖喱面; traditional Chinese: 咖喱麵; pinyin: Gālímiàn; Jyutping: Gaa3 Lei1 Min6; Pe̍h-ōe-jī: Ka-lí-mī) is a spicy noodle soup associated particularly with Malaysian Chinese cuisine. It is commonly prepared with yellow noodles or rice vermicelli in a spiced coconut-milk broth and may contain ingredients such as tofu puffs, cockles, cuttlefish, prawns, chicken and pork products.

The term overlaps with curry laksa in parts of Malaysia, and curry mee is also known as curry laksa in some Malaysian usage. Coconut-based laksa dishes are likewise found in Singapore, although their names, ingredients and preparation vary by region.

== Preparation ==
A typical preparation of curry mee consists of thin yellow noodles or rice vermicelli immersed in a spiced broth enriched with coconut milk, accompanied with chilli or sambal relish. Potential toppings for curry mee include chicken, prawns, cuttlefish, cockles, boiled eggs, pieces of deep fried tofu puffs, fried foo chuk, green beans, bean sprouts and mint leaves.

Chinese-style preparations often include pork products, such as fried lard croutons and cubes of pig blood curd. Curry mee prepared for Muslim customers excludes pork products in compliance of halal dietary laws.

=== Variants ===
Two common forms are found in the northern Malaysian state of Penang: a bright orange chicken-curry version and a pale, thin coconut-broth version known as white curry mee. Its capital city of George Town is famous for its curry mee, which is considered a staple favourite among local residents. A notable stall in the Ayer Itam area, which was operated by a pair of sisters for over 70 years, is renowned for its version of the dish and its founders have become local cultural icons.

Some versions of the dish are prepared with gravy which is drier and thicker in consistency. The city of Ipoh in Perak state is known for its dry curry noodles, which are often topped with pieces of cooked chicken, char siu or roast pork.

Curry mee is also available as a flavour for commercial instant noodles. Unusual variants which trended on social media involve boiling Maggi brand instant curry mee together with Milo powder or serving it with KitKat chocolate bars.

In Bandung of Indonesia, mie kari consists of beef, potatoes, boiled egg, soybean, emping, bawang goreng, and sweet soy sauce. The ingredients of mie kari are the same as lontong kari dish but the lontong is replaced with noodles.

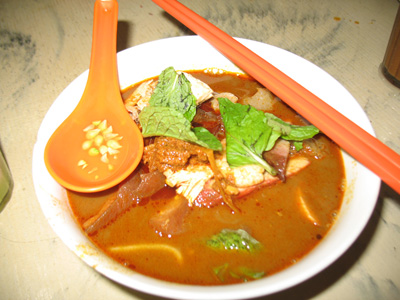
Ipoh-style curry mee with soupy consistency

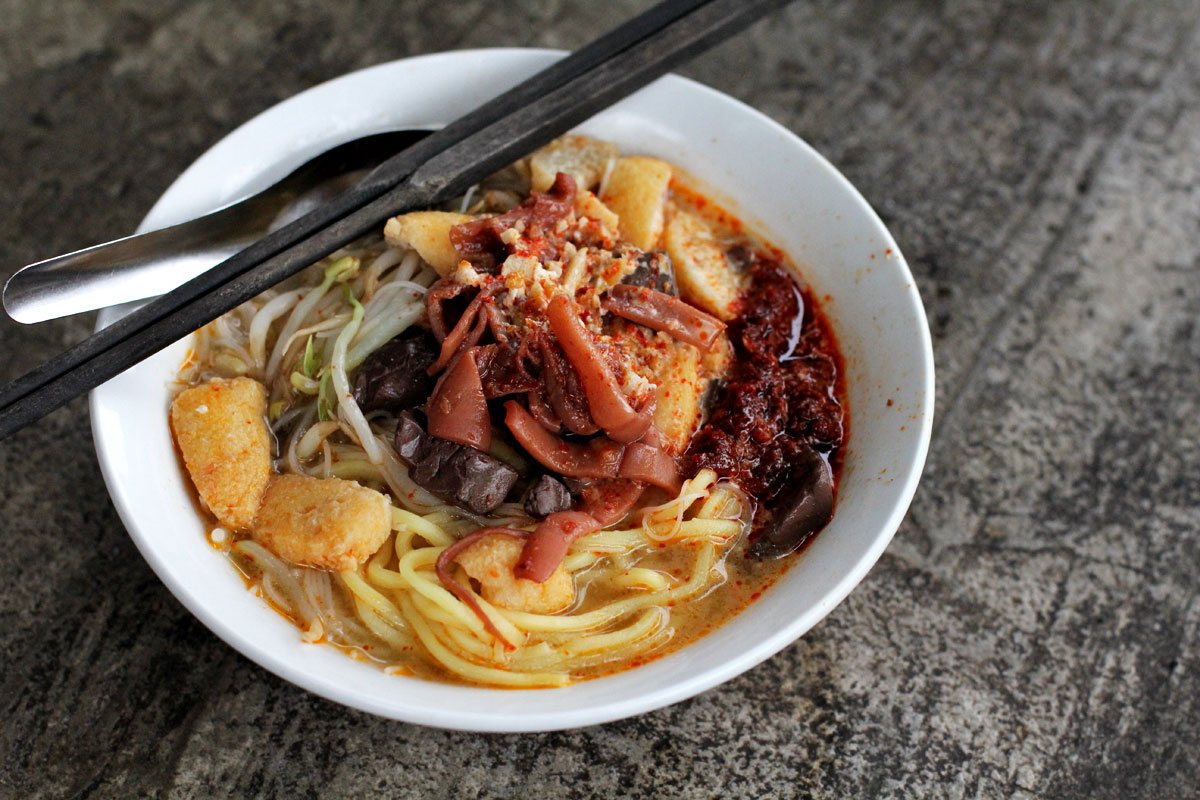
White curry mee from the Lim Sisters' Ayer Itam stall.

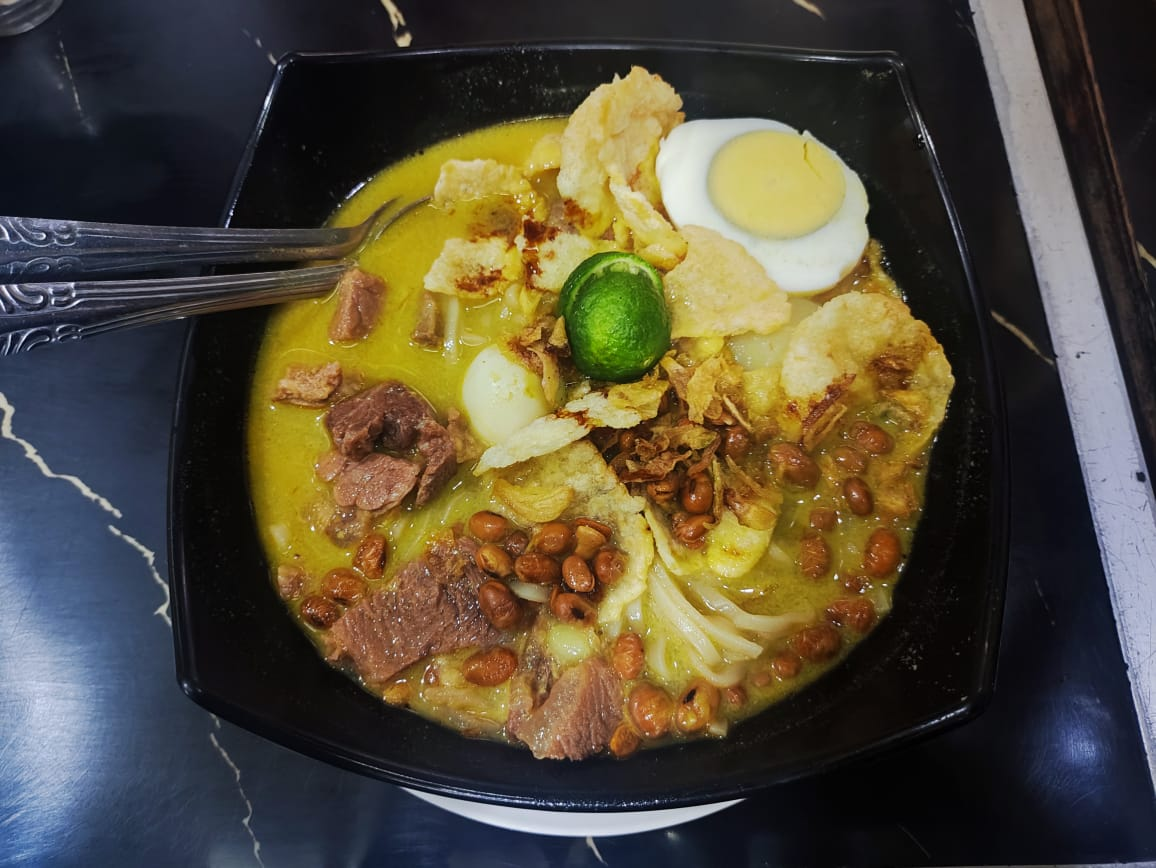
Bandung-style mie kari

== See also ==
- Laksa - spicy noodle dish found in Southeast Asia
- Khao soi - a curry noodle dish in northern Thailand
- Mie aceh – found in Aceh Province, Indonesia
