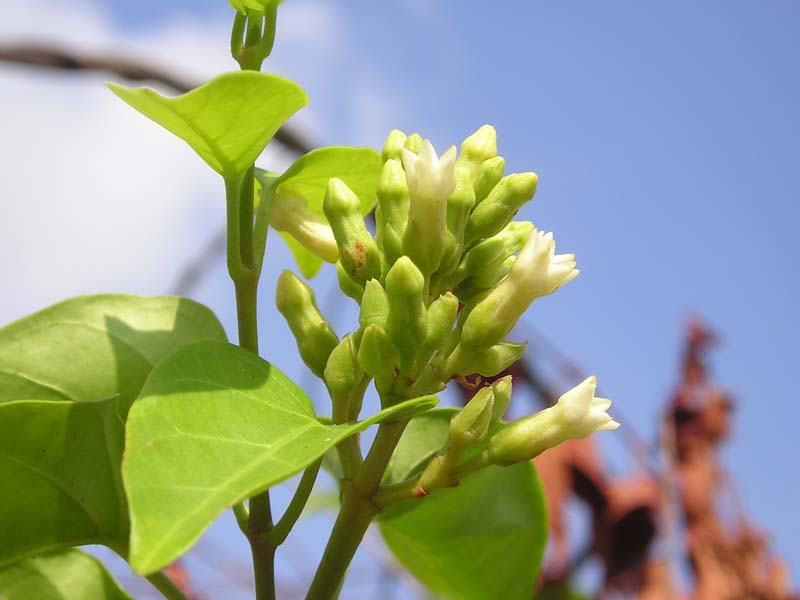
- Aganonerion polymorphum

Scientific classification
- Kingdom: Plantae
- Clade: Tracheophytes
- Clade: Angiosperms
- Clade: Eudicots
- Clade: Asterids
- Order: Gentianales
- Family: Apocynaceae
- Genus: Urceola
- Species: U. polymorpha

Binomial name
- Urceola polymorpha (Pierre ex Spire) D.J.Middleton & Livsh. (2018)

Synonyms
- Aganonerion polymorphum Pierre ex Spire (1906)

= Urceola polymorpha =

Genus of plants

Urceola polymorpha is a species of flowering plant in the dogbane family (Apocynaceae). It is native to Indochina (Thailand, Laos, Cambodia, and Vietnam).

This plant is a perennial herb with glabrous climbing stems of 1.6–4.0 m long. Its leaves are ovate glabrous with short petioles, and are 2.5–10 cm long and 2–5 cm wide. The tips of the leaves are sharpened while the base is cordate. Its flowers are umbels, with follicles that are 8–15 cm long and 5–8 mm wide.

Urceola polymorpha is used medicinally and as food, appearing for example in a traditional Vietnamese soup called canh chua. In Vietnamese, the plant is called lá giang, literally "river leaf." In Cambodia, it is called /vɔə tʰnɜŋ/ (វល្លិថ្នឹង) or /kaɔt prɷm/ (កោតព្រំ).

The species was first described in 1906 as Aganonerion polymorphum. In 2018 it was reclassified into genus Urceola as Urceola polymorpha.
