= Laksa =

Spicy noodle dish from Southeast Asia

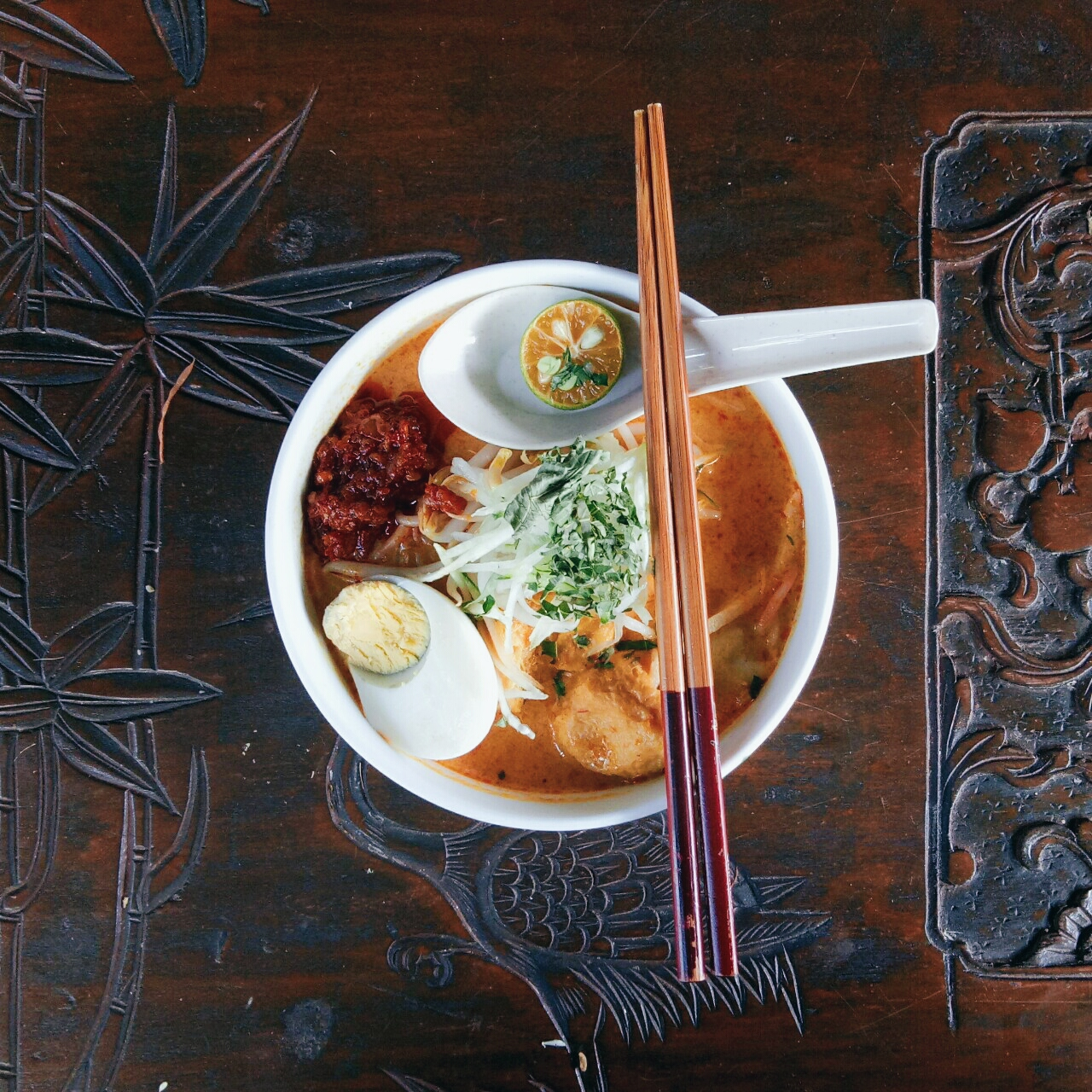
- A typical serving of Peranakan-style laksa, with a coconut soup base
- Type: Noodle dish
- Course: Breakfast, lunch or dinner
- Place of origin: Maritime Southeast Asia
- Associated cuisine: Indonesia, Malaysia, Singapore
- Created by: Peranakan Chinese
- Serving temperature: Hot
- Main ingredients: Noodles; herbs; coconut milk; tamarind; spice paste

Laksa (Jawi: لقسا; Chinese: 叻沙) is a spicy noodle dish popular in Southeast Asia. Laksa consists of various types of noodles, most commonly thick rice noodles, with toppings such as chicken, prawns or fish. Most variations of laksa are prepared with a rich and spicy coconut curry soup or a broth seasoned with a souring ingredient like tamarind or asam gelugur.

Originating from Peranakan Chinese cuisine, laksa recipes are commonly served in Singapore, Indonesia, and Malaysia.

== Etymology ==
The word laksa is borrowed from Malay and derives from the Persian word lāḵisha, literally meaning "slippery", which was used to refer to noodles. An early mention of laksa in the English language can be found in a Royal Geographical Society journal from 1846. According to Denys Lombard in the book Le carrefour Javanais. Essai d'histoire globale II (The Javanese Crossroads: Towards a Global History, 2005), one of the earliest record of the word laksa to describe noodles was found in the Javanese Biluluk inscription dated from 1391 of Majapahit era that mentions the word hanglaksa. In Kawi, hanglaksa means "vermicelli maker".

== Origin ==
Laksa is a dish of Peranakan Chinese origin, with a variety of ingredients and preparation processes that vary greatly by region. Because laksa has different varieties across the region, it is difficult to pinpoint the exact origin of the dish. Nevertheless, a number of laksa recipes have been developed along the trade channels of Southeast Asia—where the ports of Singapore, Penang, Medan, Malacca, Palembang, and Batavia (now Jakarta) are the major stops along the historic spice route. The intensive trade links among these port cities enable exchanges of ideas to take place, including sharing recipes.

There are various theories about the origins of laksa. One goes back to the 15th-century Ming Chinese naval expeditions led by Zheng He, whose armada navigated Maritime Southeast Asia. Overseas Chinese migrants had settled in various parts of Maritime Southeast Asia, long before Zheng He's expedition. However, it was after this that the number of Chinese migrants and traders significantly increased. These Chinese men intermarried into the local populations, and together they formed mixed-race communities called the Peranakan Chinese or Straits Chinese.

In Malaysia, the earliest variant of laksa is believed to have been introduced by the Peranakan Chinese in Malacca. In Singapore, the dish is believed to have been created after interaction between the Peranakan Chinese with local Singaporean Malays.

In traditional Sundanese community of Baduy in Banten province, there is a harvest ceremony involving the making of laksa, called ngalaksa ceremony. Ngalaksa is a Sundanese traditional harvest thanksgiving ceremony, in which a traditional noodle-like laksa dish made of rice flour is prepared and consumed communally. In old Sundanese language the term laksa also means "noodle", which is the same meaning as in Javanese Kawi counterpart.

In Indonesia, the dish is believed to have been born from the mixing of the cultures and cooking practices of local people and Chinese immigrants. Historians believe laksa is a dish that was born from actual intermarriage. In early coastal pecinan (Chinese settlement) in maritime Southeast Asia, it was only Chinese men that ventured abroad out from China to trade. When settling down in the new town, these Chinese traders and sailors set out to find local wives, and these women began incorporating local spices and coconut milk into Chinese noodle soup served to their husbands. This creates the hybrid Chinese-local (Malay or Javanese) culture called Peranakan culture. As Peranakan Chinese communities have blended their ancestors' culture with local culture, Peranakan communities in different places now demonstrate diversity according to the local flavour.

== Ingredients ==
A wide variety of laksa exists in Southeast Asia, with regional and vendor-specific differences. Laksa can be broadly categorized by its two main ingredients: noodles and soup. Most preparations of laksa are garnished with herbs. Two of the most widely used herbs are mint and Vietnamese coriander, known in Malay as daun kesum or by its colloquial name daun laksa "laksa leaf". Another popular garnish used for many laksa recipes is the unopened flower bud of the torch ginger, usually sliced or shredded.

=== Noodles ===
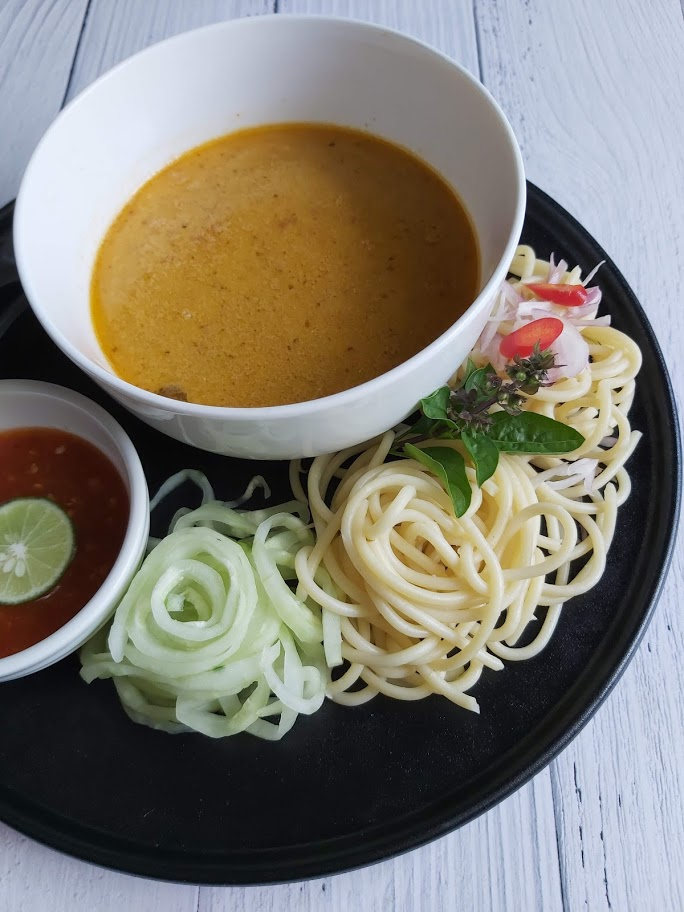
Laksa Johor is notable for its use of cooked spaghetti.

Thick rice noodles, also known as "laksa noodles" are most commonly used, although thin rice vermicelli (米粉 "bee hoon") are also common. Some laksa variants might use fresh rice noodles handmade from scratch, other types of noodles; Johor laksa for example uses wheat-based spaghetti, while Kelantanese laksam is served with wide strips of rice noodle rolls similar in texture to shahe fen.

=== Soup ===
The type of Laksa is generally based upon the soup base employed in its recipe; either rich and savoury coconut milk, fresh and sour asam (tamarind, tamarind slice), or a combination of those two.

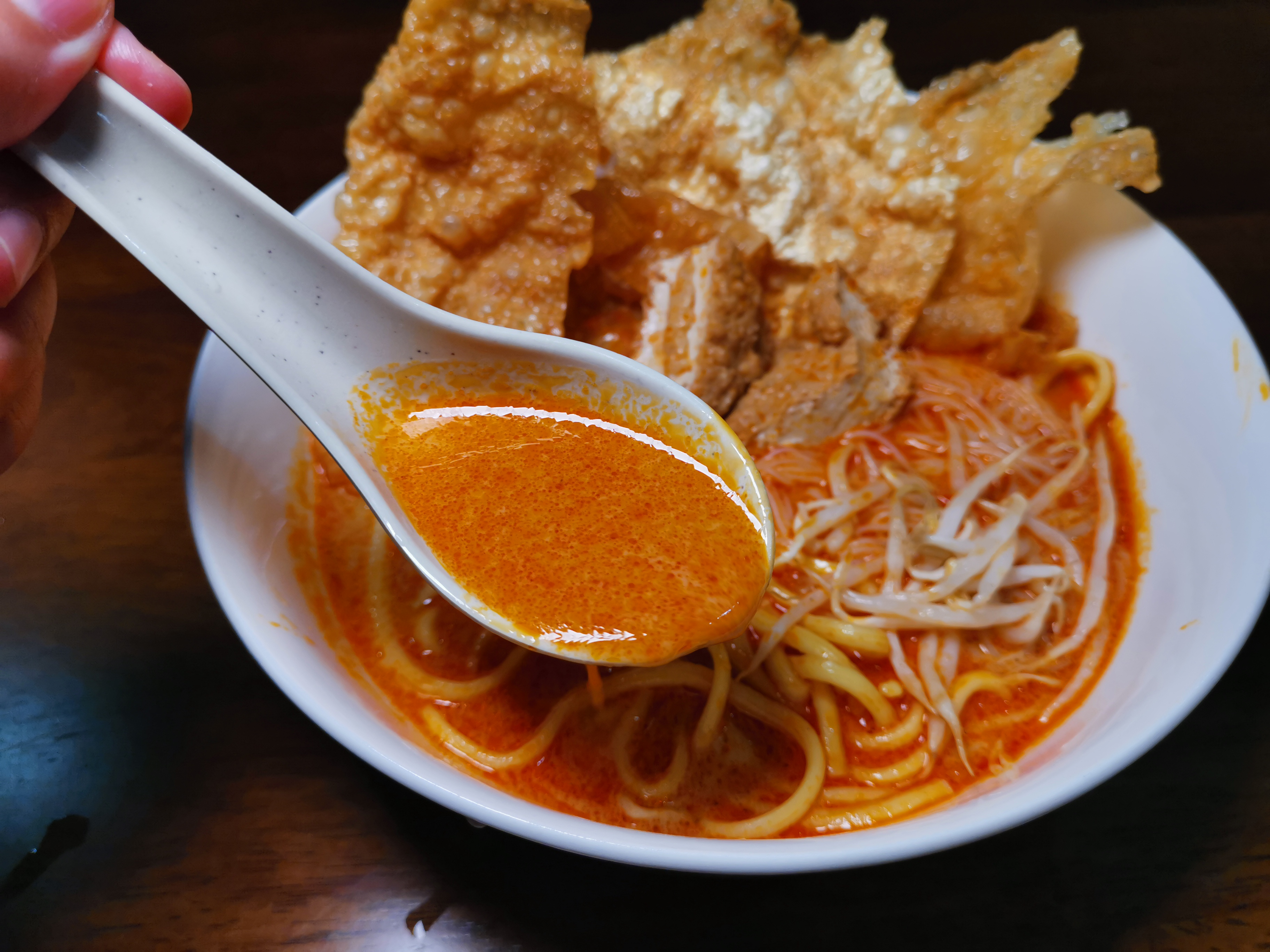
Coconut milk adds a distinctive richness or lemak quality to laksa broth.

Laksa with a rich and strongly spiced coconut gravy is typically described in Malaysia and Singapore as Laksa Lemak or Nyonya Laksa (Laksa Nyonya). Lemak is a Malay culinary description that specifically refers to the presence of coconut milk which adds a distinctive richness to a dish, whereas Nyonya alludes to the dish's Peranakan origins and the role of women in Peranakan cuisine. "Laksa" is also an alternate name used for curry mee, a similar coconut soup noodle dish widely popular within the region which is sometimes known as curry laksa. The most common toppings for the various versions of coconut soup laksa include eggs, deep-fried tofu, beansprouts, and herbs, with a spoonful of sambal chilli paste on the side as a relish.

The Malay word asam refers to any ingredient that makes a dish taste sour (e.g. tamarind (Malay: Asam Jawa) or tamarind slice (Malay: Asam Gelugor), which comes from a different tree despite its name). The main ingredients for tamarind-based laksa typically include shredded fish, normally mackerel (ikan kembung), and finely sliced vegetables including cucumber, onions, red chillies, pineapple, mint leaves, laksa leaves, and shredded torch ginger flower. Preparations for tamarind-based laksa usually produce tangy, spicy, sour flavours. This type of Laksa is normally served with either thick rice noodles ("laksa") or thin rice noodles ("mee hoon") and topped off with otak udang or hae ko (Penang Hokkien: 蝦膏; hêe-ko), a thick sweet shrimp paste.

In Indonesia, most laksa variants are coconut milk-based soups. Common spices include turmeric, coriander, candlenut, lemongrass, garlic, shallot, and pepper cooked in coconut milk. Widely available daun kemangi (lemon basil leaf) is commonly used instead of daun kesum commonly used in Malaysia and Singapore. Thin rice vermicelli ("bee hoon") is most commonly used, instead of thick rice noodle ("laksa"). Some recipes might even add slices of ketupat or lontong rice cake.

== Regional variations ==
=== Singapore ===
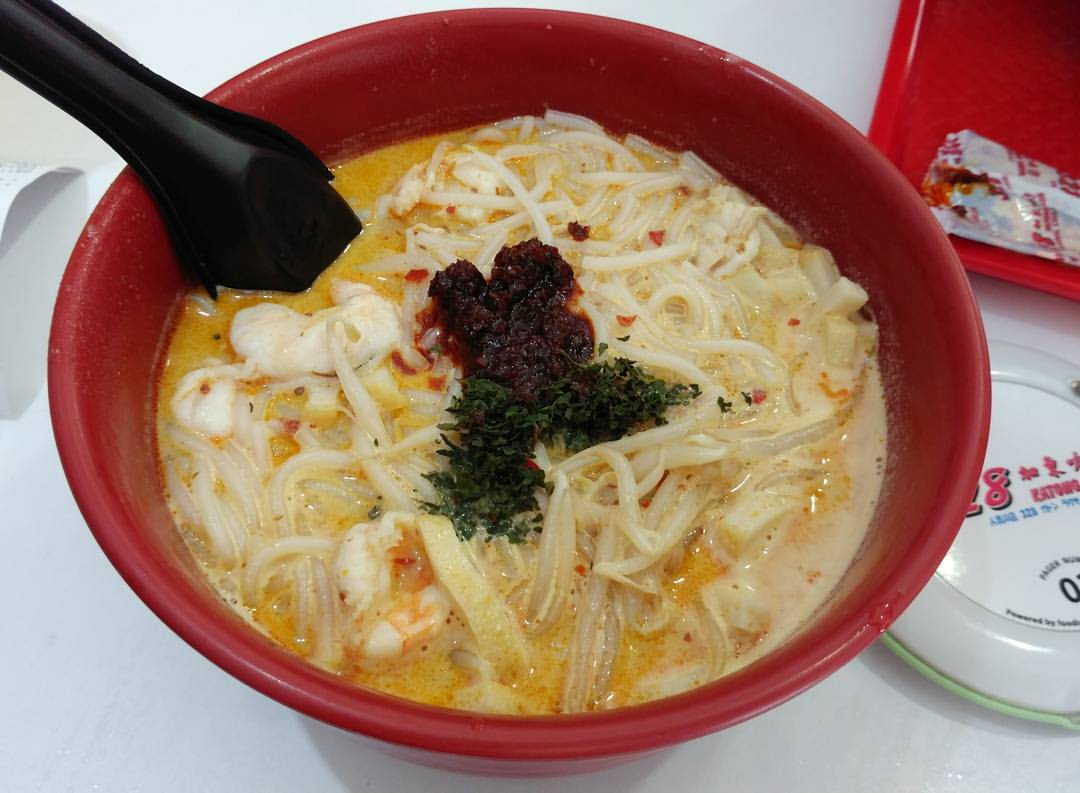
A typical bowl of Katong Laksa in Singapore

- Katong Laksa (Chinese: 加东叻沙; Laksa Katong), from the Singaporean residential neighbourhood of Katong, is a variant of Singapore-style Laksa Lemak or Singapore Laksa (Chinese: 新加坡叻沙; Laksa Singapura). The noodles in Katong Laksa are normally cut into smaller pieces so that the entire dish can be eaten with a spoon alone, without chopsticks or a fork. Another hallmark feature of this laksa is the gravy thickened not just with coconut milk but ground dried shrimp, which gives the soup its characteristic "sandy" texture.
- Siglap Laksa (Laksa Siglap) from the neighbourhood of Kampung Siglap resembles Johor laksa but it is eaten with laksa noodles instead of spaghetti. The laksa is accompanied by cucumber, bean sprouts, laksa leaves and a dollop of sambal.

=== Indonesia ===
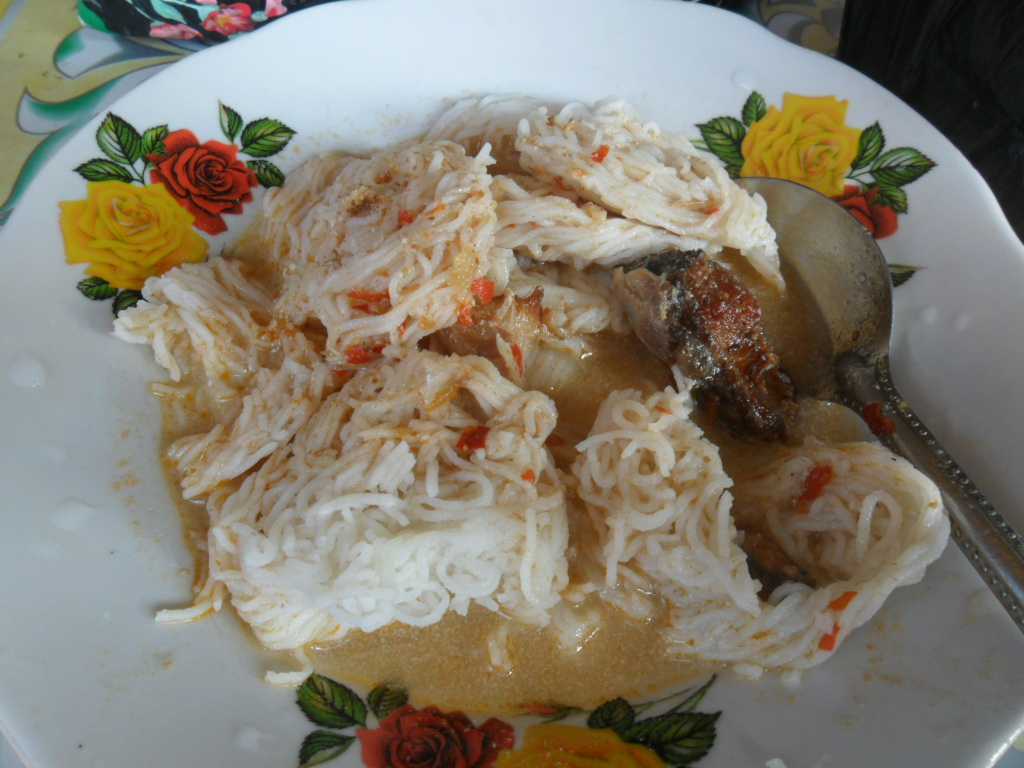
Banjar Laksa, a specialty of Banjarmasin

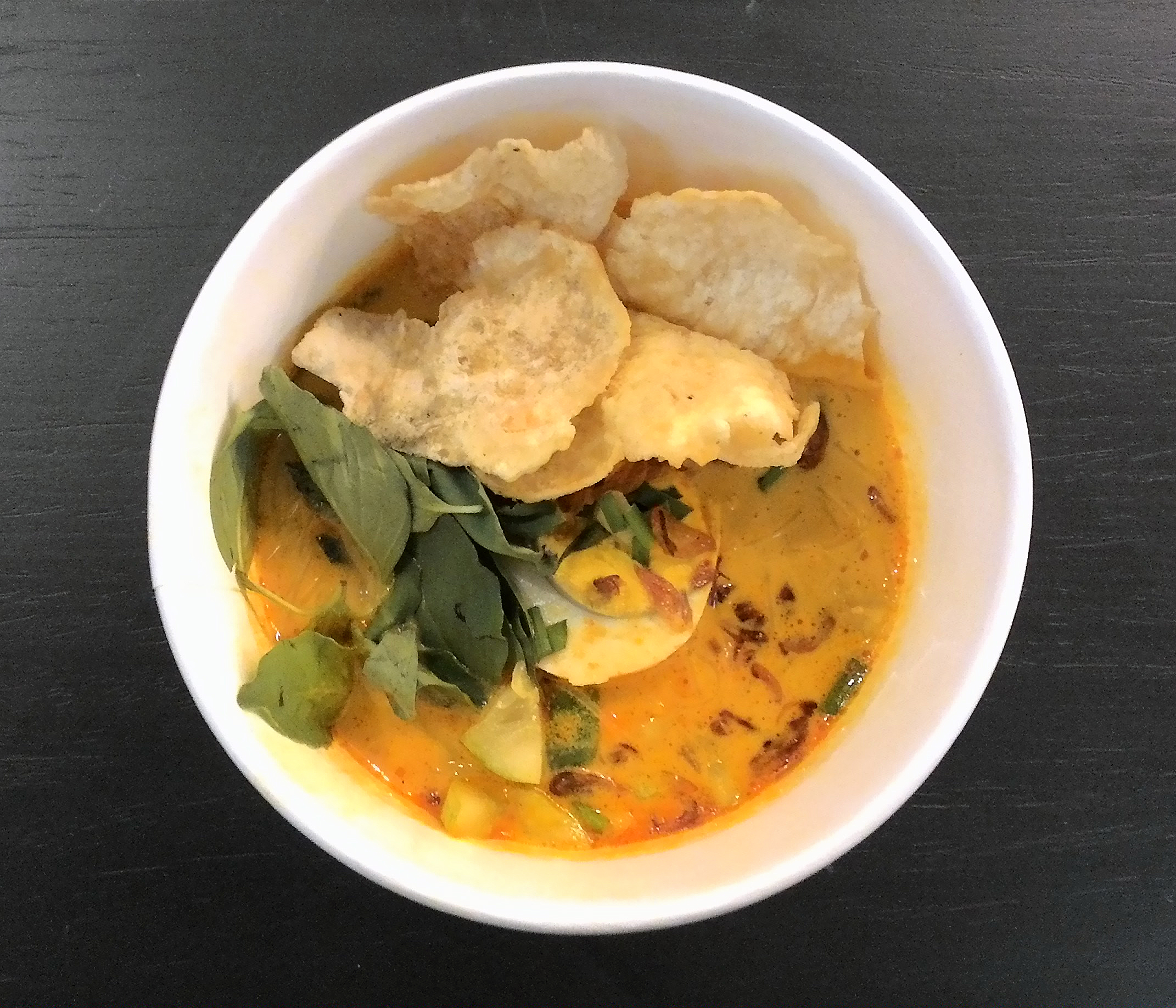
Betawi Laksa served with emping cracker

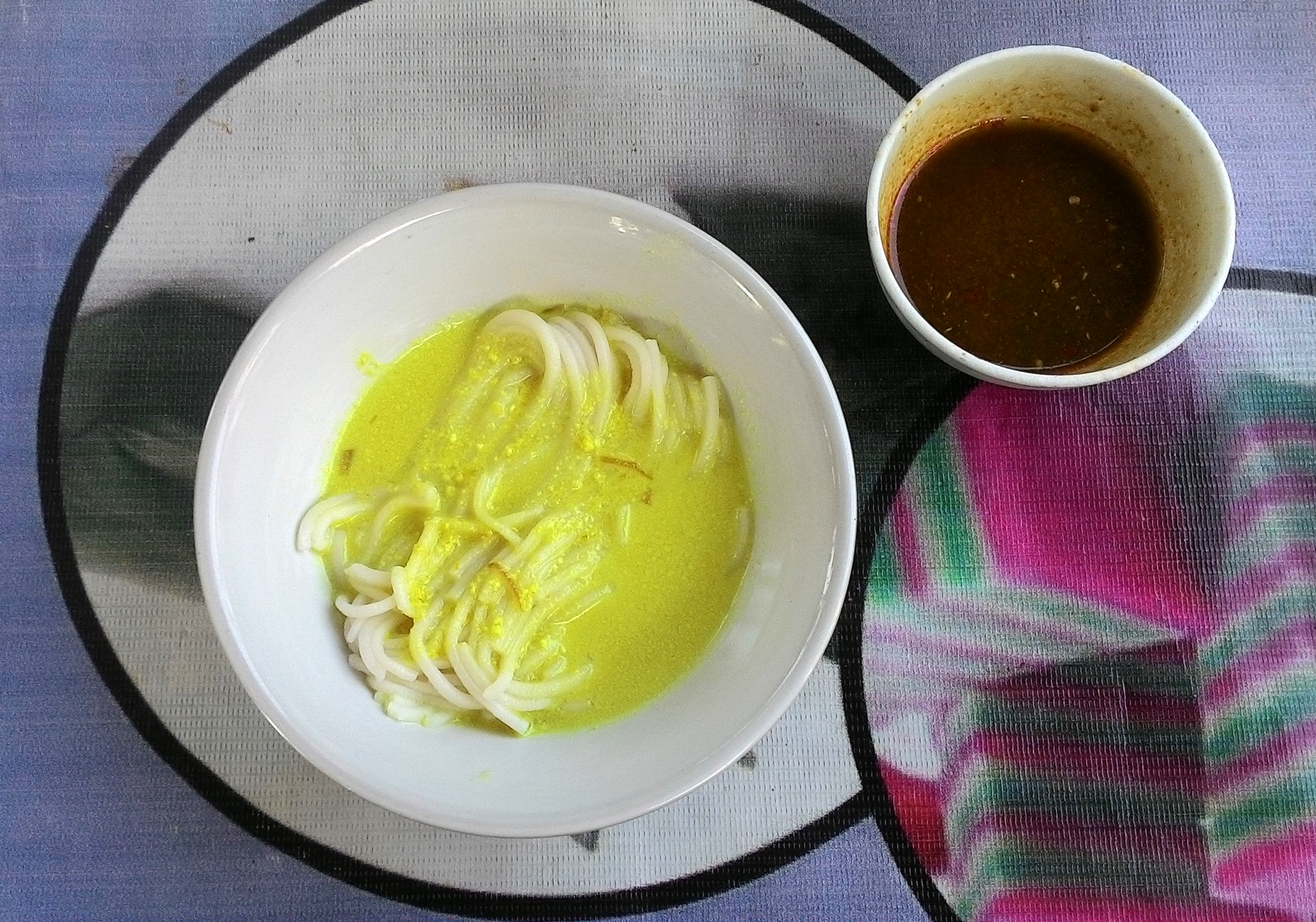
Lakso, a specialty of Palembang

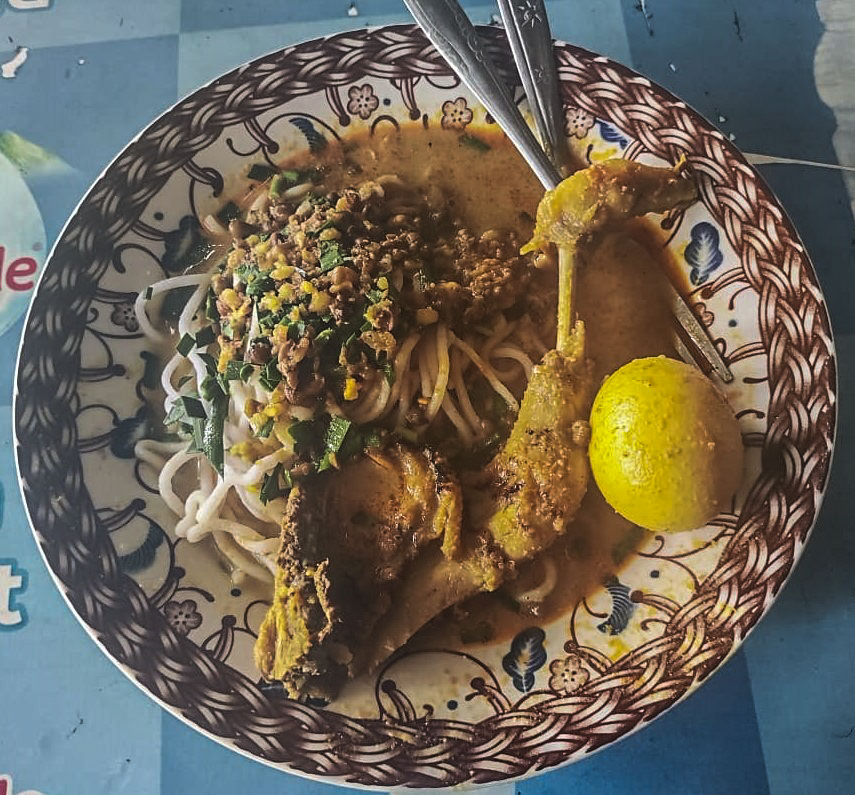
Laksa Tangerang, a specialty of Tangerang

- Baduy Laksa (Laksa Baduy) possibly is one of the oldest and the most traditional laksa variant in Indonesia. Unlike commonly known laksa recipes as a spicy noodle soup dish, laksa baduy's form is more akin to lontong and lepet rice cake. Laksa baduy is a type of traditional food in a form of wide noodles similar to kwetiau made from rice flour. The rice flour dough is boiled in water spiced with papagan combrang (kecombrang or torch ginger), then made into noodles. Baduy laksa is wrapped in congkok leaf (Molineria capitulata leaf) or in upih (betel nut stems). Laksa baduy is treated as a traditional dish prerequisite for ngalaksa ceremony conducted by Baduy people, thus not widely available nor commonly sold.
- Banjar Laksa (Laksa Banjar) is a laksa variant from Indonesian city of Banjarmasin that has snakehead (ikan haruan) as one of its ingredients. Similar to Palembang Lakso, instead of rice noodle or vermicelli, Banjar Laksa uses steamed noodle-like balls, made from rice flour paste, served in a thick yellowish soup made from coconut milk, ground spices, and snakehead fish broth. Sprinkles of fried shallots (bawang goreng) and hard-boiled duck egg might also be added.
- Betawi Laksa (Laksa Betawi) is a laksa variant from Jakarta, Indonesia, is similar to Bogor Laksa. However, Betawi Laksa is accompanied with basil leaves, chives, rice vermicelli, and perkedel. The thick yellowish coconut milk based soup contains ground (dried shrimp) to give it unique taste.
- Bogor Laksa (Laksa Bogor) is perhaps the most famous laksa variant in Indonesia from Bogor, West Java. The thick yellowish coconut milk-based soup is a mixture of shallot, garlic, candlenut, turmeric, coriander, lemongrass and salt. It has a distinct earthy and nutty flavour acquired from oncom (orange-coloured fermented beans cake, similar to tempe but made of different type of fungi mixed with soy pulp) and is served with ketupat as well as sambal cuka (ground chilli in vinegar).
- Cibinong Laksa (Laksa Cibinong) from Cibinong, a town between Bogor and Jakarta is similar to Bogor Laksa, however no oncom is added. The soup is a mixture of spices in coconut milk and it is served with bean sprout, rice vermicelli, hard-boiled eggs, cooked shredded chicken, fried shallots, and Indonesian lemon-basil leaves.
- Laksa Ambon from Ambon, Maluku, a spicy stir-fried cellophane noodles. It could be served as a condiment of nasi kuning ambon.
- Laksa Medan, a laksa dish from Medan, North Sumatra. The main ingredients of the soup are fish and kecombrang.
- Laksa Tambelan from the Indonesian islands of Tambelan uses flaked sauteed ikan tongkol asap instead of fresh fish. The dish consists of sagoo noodles, that is served in spicy coconut-based stock made of kerisik (sauteed grated coconut, pounded or blended into paste).
- Laksa Tangerang is a laksa variant from Tangerang, Indonesia. The main ingredients of Tangerang Laksa are chicken stock, mung beans, potatoes and chives. Tangerang Laksa consists of handmade noodles from the flour of boiled white rice and a thick yellow gravy similar to Bogor Laksa. Additionally, grated coconut and green beans are also added to give a sweet taste effect. Tangerang Laksa is valued for a balanced consistency of its coconut milk soup, which is not too thick or too watery.
- Lakse Kuah is a specialty of Indonesian island of Natuna, is similar to Terengganu Laksa Kuah Merah. The dish consists of noodles made of sago and mashed tongkol flesh and served in spicy coconut milk gravy made of the spice mixture. Lakse Kuah is usually served with sambal terasi and daun salam.
- Palembang Laksan (Laksan Palembang) is a specialty of Indonesian city of Palembang. It consists of sliced fishcake that is served in coconut milk-shrimp broth based soup, sprinkled with fried shallots.
- Palembang Celimpungan (Celimpungan Palembang) is also a specialty of Palembang. The dish consists of a gravy similar to Laksan with a ball or oval-shaped fishcakes.
- Palembang Burgo (Burgo Palembang) is a laksa variant from Palembang. Burgo itself refers to its filling, made from rice flour and sago flour that is processed to resemble a thin omelette. The broth is pale white, made from coconut milk and various spices. It is usually accompanied with fish sauce, boiled eggs, and fried onions.
- Palembang Lakso (Lakso Palembang) is a laksa variant from Palembang. Unlike Laksan, Lakso consists of noodle-like steamed sago paste but served in Burgo-like coconut milk soup with only an addition of turmeric and sprinkled with fried shallots.

=== Malaysia ===
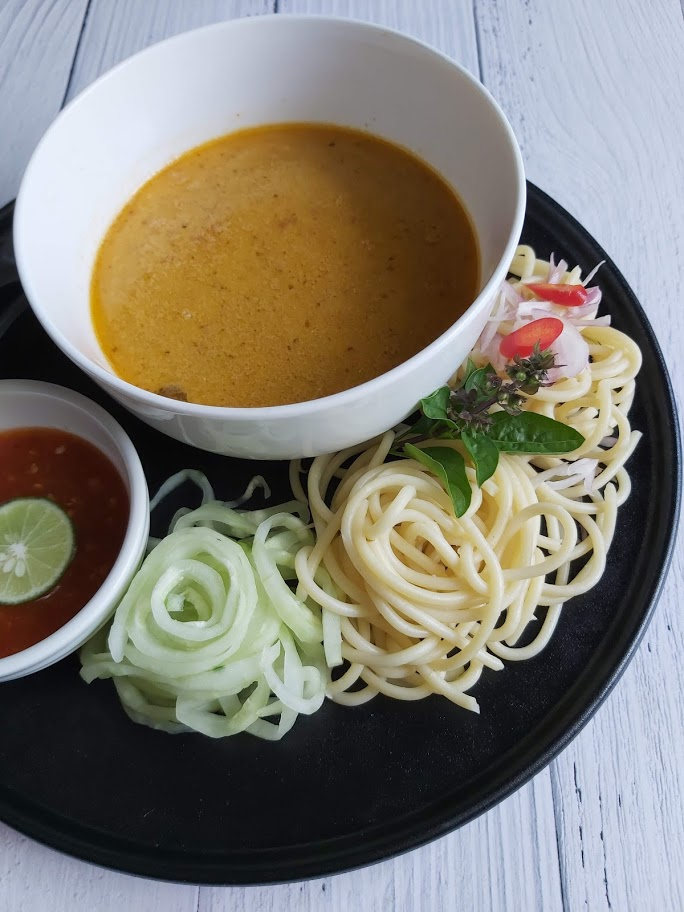
Laksa Johor

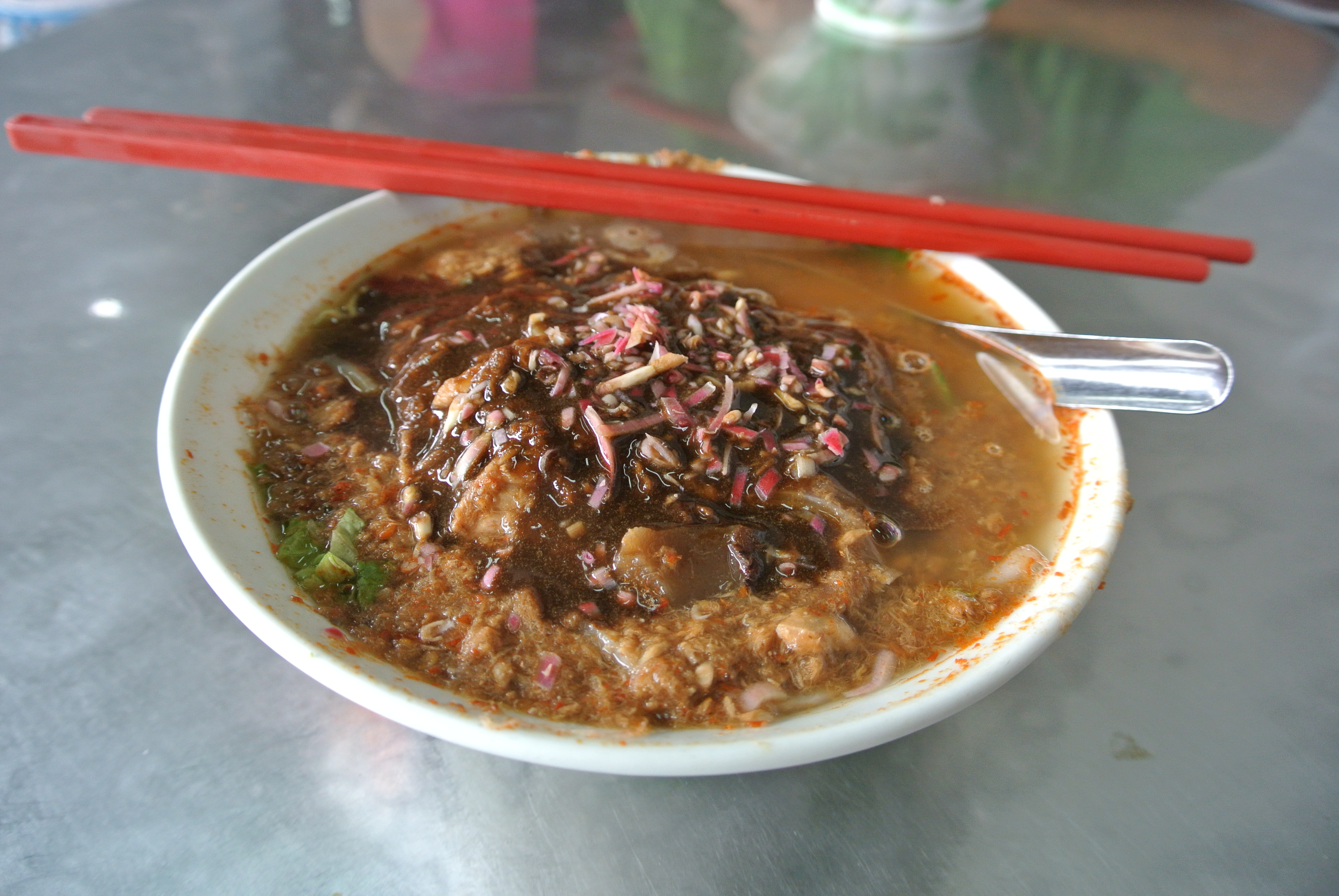
A bowl of Penang Laksa from the Air Itam area.

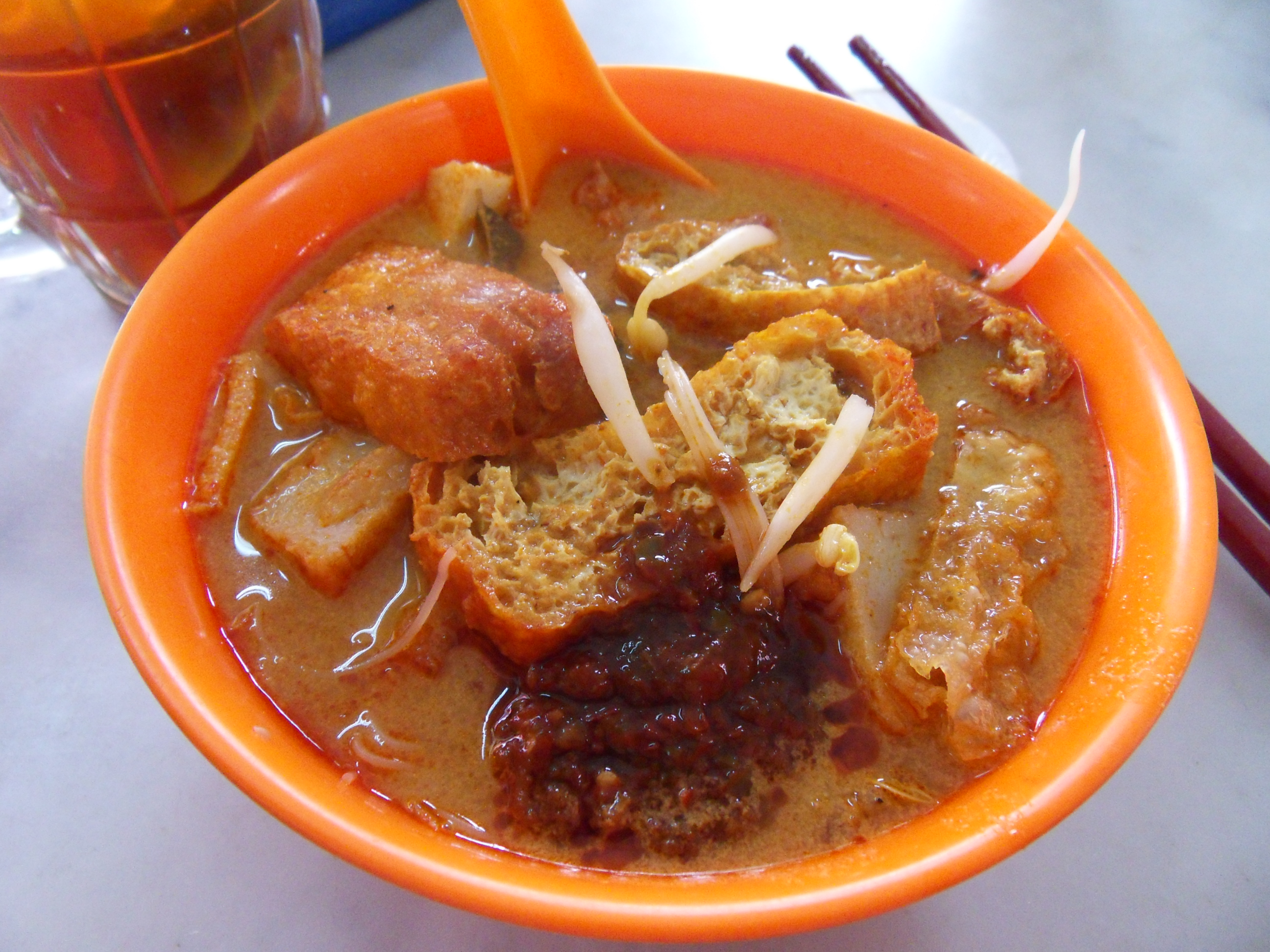
A typical bowl of curry laksa in Kuala Lumpur

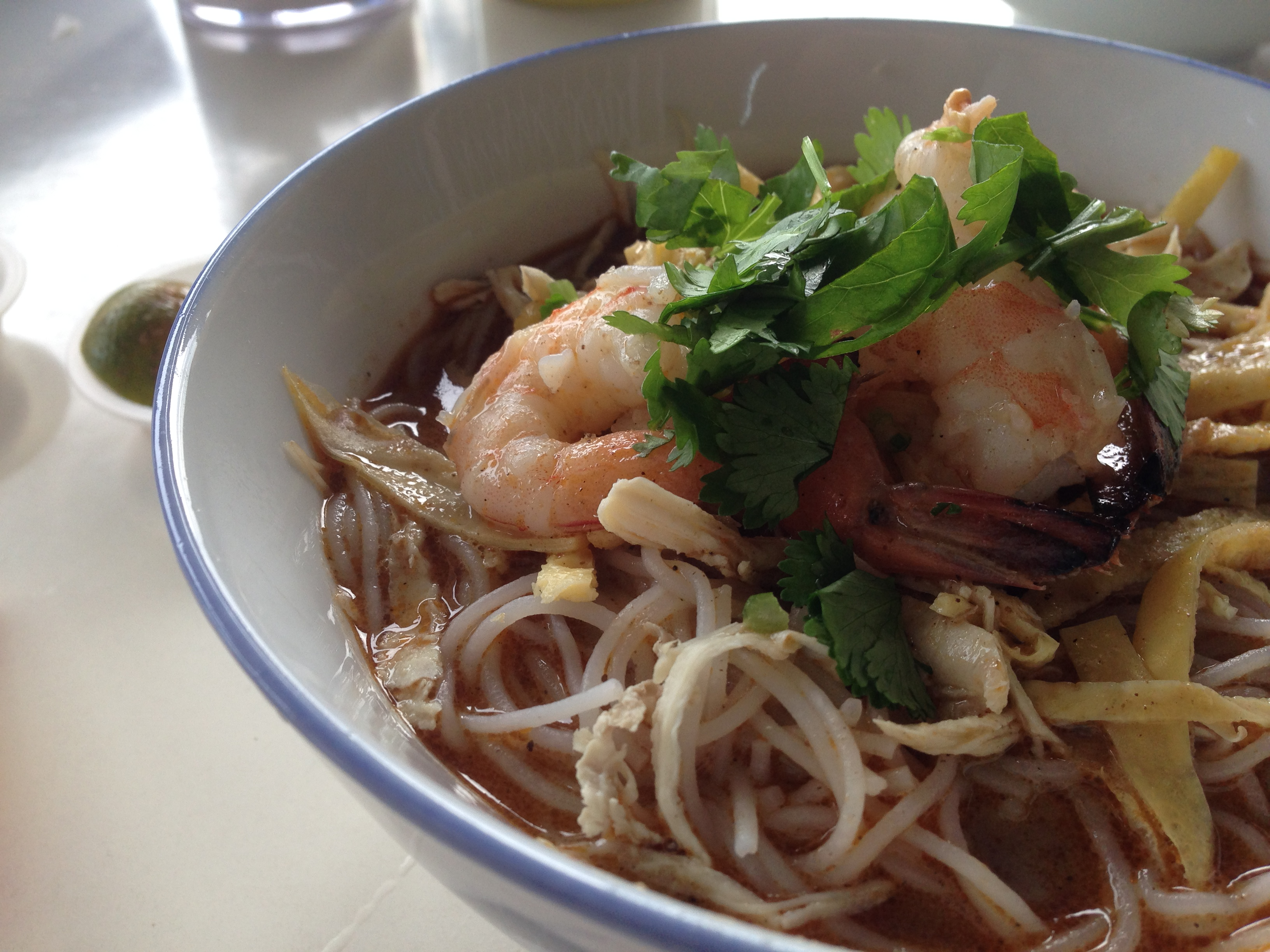
Laksa Sarawak, a specialty of Kuching

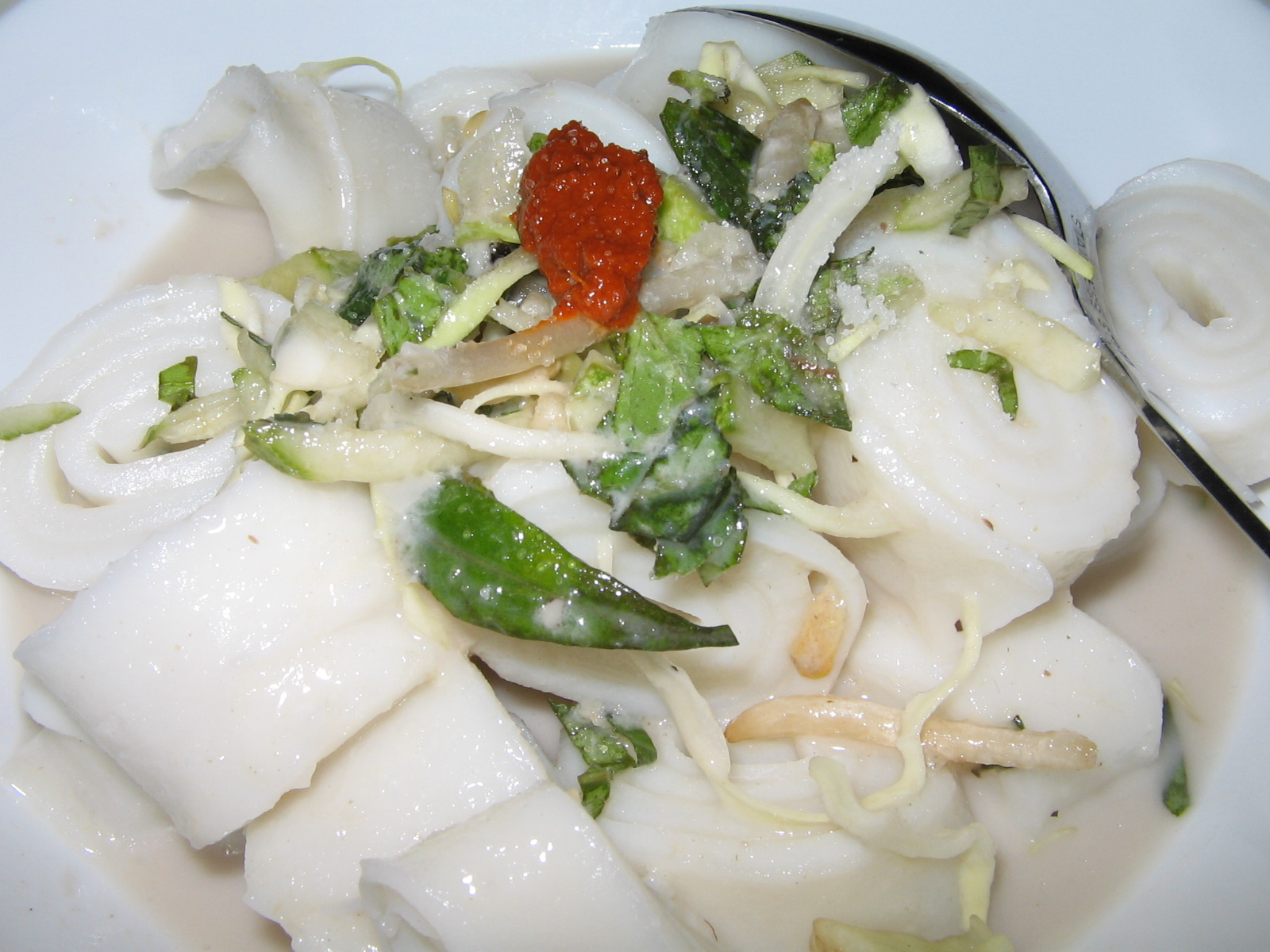
Laksam, a variant dish found in the northeastern states of Malaysia and Southern Thailand

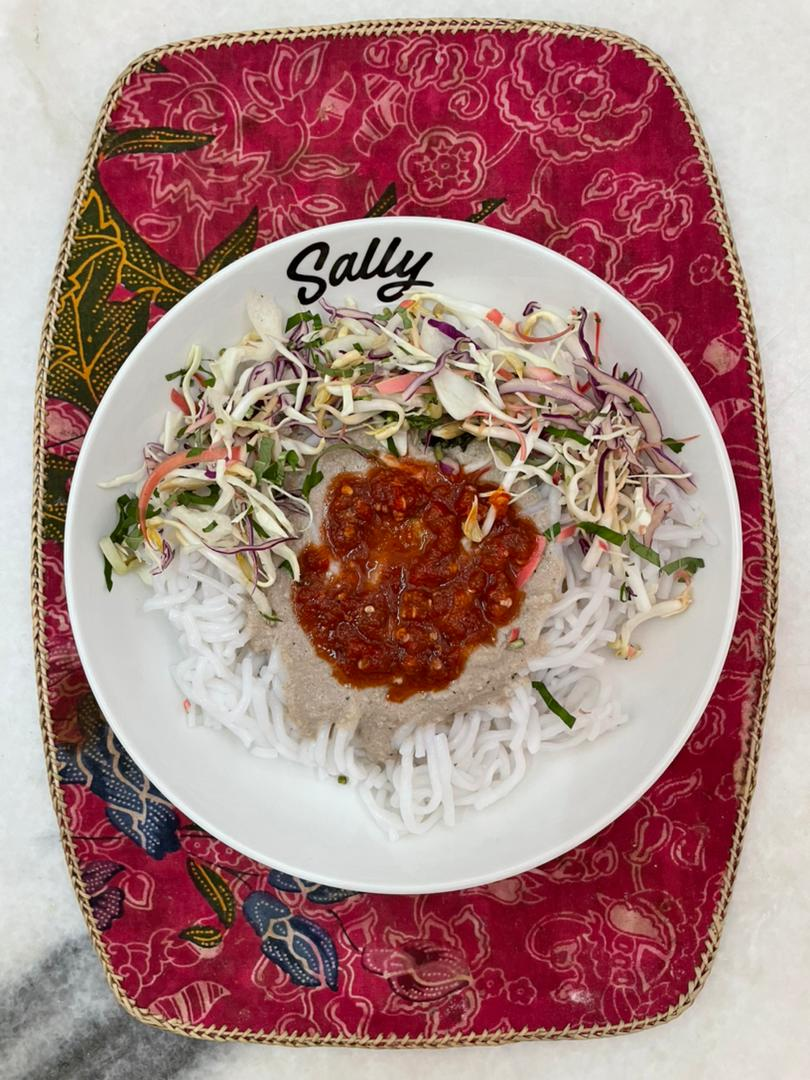
Laksa Kelantan, a specialty of Kelantanese cuisine

- Johor Laksa (Laksa Johor) from Johor state in southern Malaysia resembles Penang Laksa but differs greatly because it is eaten with spaghetti and the broth is made of grilled wolf herring (parang), concentrated coconut milk, onion and spices. The uniqueness of Johor Laksa is its use of spaghetti and the concentration of its gravy. Johor Laksa is usually served during the festive season and special occasions. People in Johor formerly used their hands to eat this dish, believing it to be tastier.
- Penang Laksa (Laksa Pulau Pinang), also known as Asam Laksa, a specialty of the Malaysian island of Penang. The soup is made with mackerel and its unique feature is the asam or tamarind which gives a sour, appetising taste. The fish is poached and then flaked. Other ingredients which give Penang Laksa its distinctive flavour include mint, pineapple slices and otak udang.
- Kedah Laksa (Laksa Kedah) is similar to Penang Laksa. The soup is usually made with eel instead of mackerel and quite differs, by the use of asam Gelugur instead of asam Jawa that is commonly used in Penang Laksa. As the main rice-producing state in Malaysia, Kedah Laksa uses rice flour to make laksa noodles. Sliced boiled eggs are usually added to the dish.
- Laksa Ikan Sekoq (Laksa Ikan Seekor) has the same base as Kedah Laksa but is served with a whole fish instead of chunks of fish meat.
- Teluk Kechai Laksa (Laksa Teluk Kechai) has the same base as Kedah Laksa but is served with a dollop of coconut sambal.
- Perlis Laksa (Laksa Perlis) is very similar to Kedah Laksa. Perlis Laksa gravy is quite concentrated because each ingredient such as mackerel, selayang fish, touch ginger and laksa leaf are blended together. The quantity of fish used is also more than laksa in other states. The broth is brighter and not reddish (i.e. chilli red) like Kedah Laksa.
- Ipoh Laksa (Laksa Ipoh), a specialty of the Malaysian city of Ipoh, is similar to Penang Laksa but has a sourer rather than sweet taste, and contains prawn paste. The garnishes used in Ipoh Laksa can differ slightly from those used in Penang Laksa.
- Kuala Kangsar Laksa (Laksa Kuala Kangsar), also known as Perak Laksa (Laksa Perak), consists of handmade wheat noodles and light broth. The soup is rather lighter than the Penang laksa and Kedah Laksa and very different from Ipoh Laksa especially in terms of presentation, taste, and smell.
- Sarang Burung Laksa (Laksa Sarang Burung) has the same base as Kuala Kangsar Laksa but served with a 'nest' made of fried eggs placed on top of laksa.
- Pangkor Mee Laksa (Laksa Mi Pangkor), a specialty of the Malaysian island of Pangkor and the surrounding mainland area of Perak. It consists of specialty-made white noodle topped with a clear seafood stock made from fish, crab, squid or shrimp boiled with dried tamarind apples and salt. Sambal and sautéed vegetables such as long beans and carrots are also added to the laksa. The dish is a must-have during festive seasons.
- Curry Laksa in Selangor and Kuala Lumpur, or the Klang Valley region, includes deep-fried tofu, cockles, long beans and mint as signature ingredients. It is typically served with yellow alkalised egg noodles (mee) and/or rice vermicelli (bee hoon).
- Sarawak Laksa (Laksa Sarawak) comes from the Malaysian state of Sarawak. Its uniqueness lies in the spices mixes that are not found in laksa dishes in other states. In addition to those spices, the basic ingredients of Sarawak Laksa are rice vermicelli, chicken, omelette, bean sprouts, shrimp and coriander sprouts. The broth is made from a mixture of sambal belacan, coconut milk, tamarind juice, garlic, galangal and lemongrass. Famous celebrity chef Anthony Bourdain called Sarawak Laksa as “Breakfast of the Gods”.
- Laksam, also known in Thailand as Lasae (Thai: ละแซ), is made with thick flat white rice flour noodles served with a rich, full-bodied white gravy of boiled fish and coconut milk. A specialty of the northeastern Malaysian states of Kelantan and Terengganu, Laksam is traditionally eaten with hands rather than utensils due to the gravy's thick consistency.
- Siamese Laksa (Laksa Siam) is similar to Penang Laksa with basically the same ingredient but more creamy and less tangy soup due to the addition of coconut milk and different varieties of herbs. Siamese Laksa like most other Curry Laksa, its spice paste need to be sautéed to bring out its fragrance, a step omitted while preparing Penang Laksa.
- Kelantan Laksa (Laksa Kelantan), from Kelantan state in northeastern Malaysia, is similar to Laksam, but instead of the thick Laksam noodles, Kelantan Laksa uses the same laksa noodles as Penang Laksa. It is served with ulam, belacan and a pinch of salt, and made slightly sweeter with palm sugar.
- Terengganu Laksa Kuah Putih (Laksa Terengganu Kuah Putih) is the easiest laksa recipe, famous in the Malaysian state of Terengganu. Laksa Kuah Putih gets its name from the coconut milk's thick, creamy white gravy. The main ingredient of Laksa Kuah Putih is minced and boiled mackerel, while the gravy is made of coconut milk mixed with hot water and usually without cooking. This is then seasoned with black pepper, onion, and minced fish, then served with ulam (raw vegetables) and blended chilli on the side.
- Terengganu Laksa Kuah Merah (Laksa Terengganu Kuah Merah) is similar to Johor Laksa. The gravy is prepared with spices and resembles Johor Laksa gravy. Laksa Kuah Merah is also served with laksa noodles and ulam on the side, similar to Laksa Kuah Putih.
- Pahang Laksa (Laksa Pahang) from the Malaysian state of Pahang is similar to Laksa Terengganu Kuah Merah but with uses salted fish, coriander, fennel, and cumin instead of the complex spice mix uses in Laksa Terengganu Kuah Merah.
- Island Laksa Kuah Lemak (Laksa Pulau Kuah Lemak), a specialty of the islands off the east coast of Johor, Malaysia, and the surrounding mainland area. This variant resembles Laksa Terengganu Kuah Putih, but has smoked fish instead of fresh fish.
- Island Laksa Kuah Kari (Laksa Pulau Kuah Kari), a specialty of the islands off the east coast of Johor, Malaysia, and the surrounding mainland area. The soup resembles Laksa Terengganu Kuah Merah but with the use of smoked fish instead of fresh fish.
- Kerabu Laksa is a salad dish that uses the elements of laksa such as Torch ginger, cucumber, mint, pineapple, onions, and chillies. The recipe has its origin in the Peranakan community in Terengganu.
- Fried Laksa (Laksa Goreng) is a modern adaptation of soupy laksa. The laksa noodles is fried with laksa gravy, similar to mee goreng and bihun goreng.

==== Summary table ====
The general differences between types of laksa in Malaysia; Sarawak Laksa, Nyonya Laksa, Curry Laksa, Laksa Kuah Merah, Laksa Kuah Putih and Asam Laksa are as follows:

Ingredients	Sarawak Laksa	Nyonya Laksa (Malacca version)	Curry Laksa (Klang Valley version)	Laksa Kuah Merah (Terengganu version)	Laksa Kuah Putih (Terengganu version)	Asam Laksa (Penang version)
Coconut milk	Used	Used	Used	Used	Used	Not used
Curry powder	Not used	Not used	Used	Used	Not used	Not used
Bean curd puff	Not used	Used	Used	Not used	Not used	Not used
Egg	Omelette	Hard-boiled egg	Hard-boiled egg	Not used	Not used	Not used
Topping (Vegetables)	Bean sprouts, and coriander or finely-chopped laksa leaf	Bean sprouts and cucumber	Bean sprouts and long beans	Bean sprouts, long beans and other ulam	Bean sprouts, long beans and other ulam	torch ginger, cucumber, mint, pineapple, onions, and chillies
Topping (Protein)	Shrimps and shredded chicken	Shrimps	Fish stick, shrimps, cockles	None	None	Shredded fish
Noodles	Vermicelli only	Laksa noodles, vermicelli or yellow noodles	Laksa noodles, vermicelli or yellow noodles	Laksa noodles only	Laksa noodles only	Laksa noodles only
Broth	Chicken and shrimp-based	Shrimp-based	Shrimp-based	Fish-based	Fish-based	Fish-based
Condiment	Sambal belacan and Calamansi	Sambal belacan	None	Sambal belacan	Sambal belacan	Otak udang
Laksa variants of similar type	(none)	Katong Laksa	Curry Mee	Siamese Laksa; Johor Laksa; Siglap Laksa; Pahang Laksa; Laksa Pulau Kuah Kari	Laksa Kelantan; Laksam; Laksa Pulau Kuah Lemak	Kedah Laksa; Laksa Ikan Sekoq; Teluk Kechai Laksa; Perlis Laksa; Ipoh Laksa; Kuala Kangsar Laksa; Sarang Burung Laksa; Pangkor Mee Laksa

== Popularity ==
Several laksa variants have gained popularity in Malaysia, Singapore, and Indonesia; and subsequently international recognition. In July 2011, CNN Travel ranked Penang Asam Laksa seventh out of the 50 most delicious foods in the world. A later online poll by 35,000 participants, published by CNN in September 2011, ranked it at number 26th. Singaporean-style Laksa on the other hand ranked on CNN "World's 50 best foods" at number 44th. In 2018, the Kuala Lumpur variant has been named the second-best food experience in the world on Lonely Planet's Ultimate Eat list.

In Indonesia, laksa is a traditional comfort food; the spicy warm noodle soup is much appreciated on cold, rainy days. However, its popularity is somewhat overshadowed by soto, a similar hearty warm soup dish, which is often consumed with rice instead of noodles. In modern households, it is common practice to mix and match laksa recipes; if traditional laksa noodle are not available, Japanese udon noodles might be used instead.

Laksa is a popular dish in Australia with the Curry Laksa being the most popular form. First appearing on the menus of eateries in cities like Adelaide in the 1970s, the coconut soup laksa variant is considered to have been normalized as one of Australia's 'borrowed' foodways since the 2010s. In Darwin, laksa is commonly found in local markets and is the city's most famous dish. The Darwin International Laksa Festival was first held in November 2019. Alongside the noodle soup dish, variants include laksa ice cream, laksa chocolate, laksa pies and laksa dumplings.

== Malaysian Tourism Board controversy ==
In 2009, as part of a national food branding exercise, Malaysian Minister of Tourism Ng Yen Yen attempted to claim ownership for regional dishes such as Laksa, Hainanese chicken rice, and bak kut teh, and she claimed others have “hijacked their dishes”. This led to discontent with regional neighbours such as Singapore and Indonesia. Ng later clarified she was misquoted on her intention to patent the foods, and that a study on the origins of the foods would be conducted “and an apology conveyed if it was wrongly claimed.” To date, the results of the study have never been made public.

== See also ==
- Mie Aceh, spicy noodle dish from Aceh
- Mie celor, savoury noodle dish from Palembang
- Sopa de lacassá, a Macanese derivative of laksa
- Soto mie, an Indonesian noodle soup dish
- Mohinga, a Burmese fish noodle soup
- Ohn no khao swè, Burmese version of coconut chicken noodle soup
- Khanom chin nam ya, a Central Thai noodle dish
- Khao soi, a northern Thai noodle dish
- Khow suey, a noodle dish originally from the Shan state in Burma
- Khao poon, a dish in Laos also known as Lao laksa
- Rice noodles
