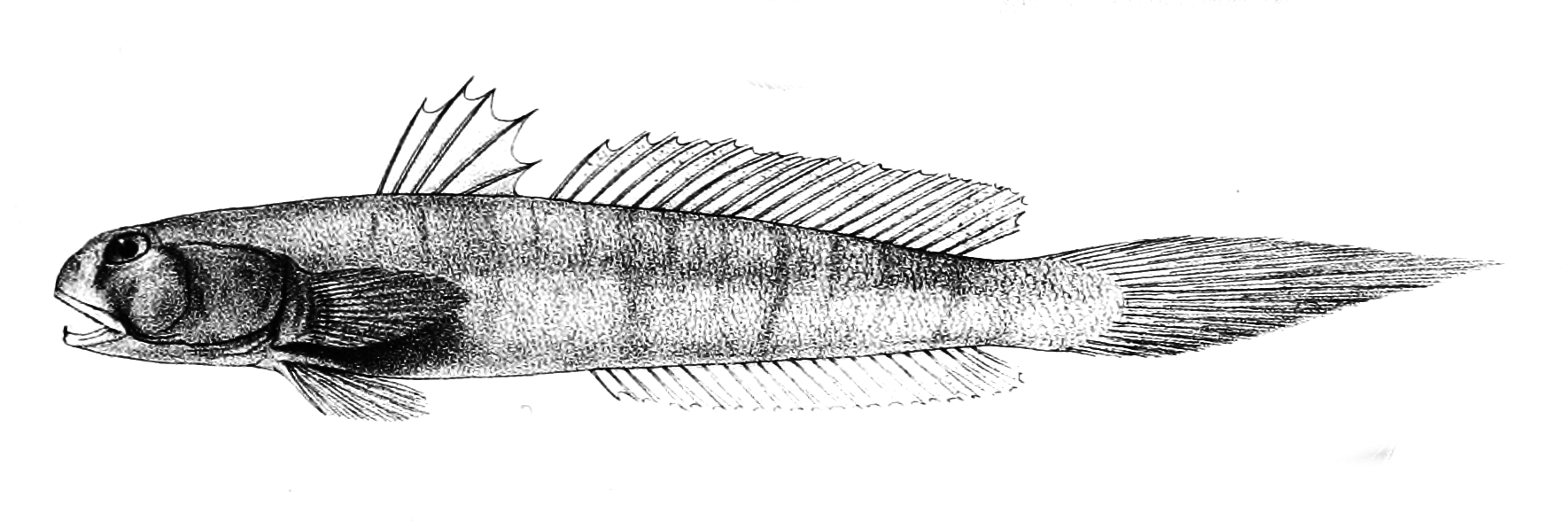

Scientific classification
- Kingdom: Animalia
- Phylum: Chordata
- Class: Actinopterygii
- Order: Gobiiformes
- Family: Oxudercidae
- Subfamily: Oxudercinae
- Genus: Apocryptes; Valenciennes, 1837
- Species: A. bato

Binomial name
- Apocryptes bato (F. Hamilton, 1822)

Synonyms
- For genus Apocryptes: Gobileptes Swainson, 1839; For species A. bato: Gobius bato F. Hamilton, 1822; Apocryptes batoides F. Day, 1876; Parapocryptes batoides (F. Day, 1876)

= Apocryptes =

Genus of fishes

Apocryptes bato is a species of mudskipper native to India, Bangladesh and Myanmar where it can be found in tropical rivers, estuaries and coastal waters of the Indian Ocean. This species can reach a length of 26 centimetres (10 in) TL. It is of minor importance to local commercial fisheries. It is currently the only known member of its genus.
