= Urceola (fungus) =

Scientific classification
- Kingdom: Fungi
- Division: Ascomycota
- Class: Leotiomycetes
- Order: Helotiales
- Family: incertae sedis
- Genus: Urceola Quél.

Genus of fungi

Urceola is a genus of fungi in the order Helotiales. The relationship of this taxon to other taxa within the order is unknown (incertae sedis), and it has not yet been placed with certainty into any family. The genus was described by French mycologist Lucien Quélet in 1886.
