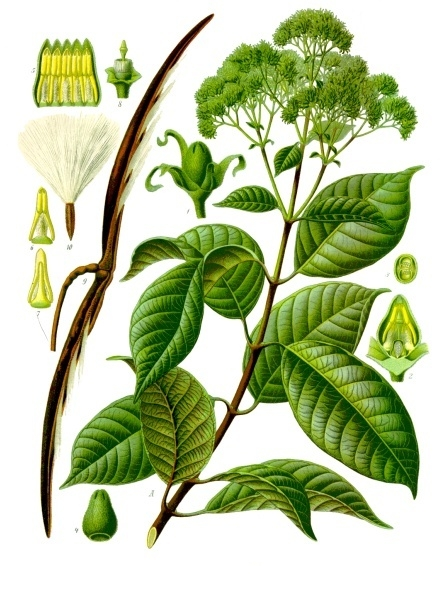
- Urceola elastica

Scientific classification
- Kingdom: Plantae
- Clade: Tracheophytes
- Clade: Angiosperms
- Clade: Eudicots
- Clade: Asterids
- Order: Gentianales
- Family: Apocynaceae
- Subfamily: Apocynoideae
- Tribe: Apocyneae
- Genus: Urceola; Roxb. (1798), nom. cons.

Synonyms
- Aganonerion Pierre ex Spire (1906); Chavannesia A.DC. (1844); Chunechites Tsiang (1937); Cudicia Buch.-Ham. ex Dillwyn (1839); Dendrocharis Miq. (1857); Ecdysanthera Hook. & Arn. (1837); Hymenolophus Boerl. (1900); Parabarium Pierre ex Spire (1905); Parameria Benth. (1876); Parameriopsis Pichon (1948); Pezisicarpus Vernet (1904); Xylinabaria Pierre (1898); Xylinabariopsis Pit. (1933)

= Urceola (plant) =

Genus of plants

Urceola is a plant genus in the family Apocynaceae, first described as a genus in 1798. It is native to China, the Himalayas, Southeast Asia, and New Guinea.

== Species ==
21 species are currently accepted:

1. Urceola brachysepala Hook.f. - Borneo, Java, W Malaysia, Sumatra, Philippines
2. Urceola densiflora (Oliv.) D.J.Middleton & Livsh. – Peninsula Malaysia (Penang) and Sumatra
3. Urceola elastica Roxb. - Borneo, Java, W Malaysia, Sumatra
4. Urceola huaitingii (Chun & Tsiang) D.J.Middleton - Guizhou, Guangdong, Guangxi, Hainan
5. Urceola javanica (Blume) Boerl. - Borneo, Java, Maluku, Sumatra, Sulawesi, New Guinea
6. Urceola laevigata (Juss.) D.J.Middleton & Livsh. – China (southern Yunnan and southern Guangxi), Indochina, and Malesia
7. Urceola laevis (Elmer) Merr. - Palawan, Sabah, Sulawesi
8. Urceola lakhimpurensis (S.K.Srivast. & Mehrotra) Karthik. & Moorthy - Assam
9. Urceola latifolia (Pierre ex Spire) D.J.Middleton - Laos, Thailand, Vietnam
10. Urceola lucida (A.DC.) Benth. & Hook.f. ex Kurz - Myanmar, Thailand, W Malaysia, Sumatra
11. Urceola malayana D.J.Middleton - Cameron Highlands of W Malaysia
12. Urceola micrantha (Wall. ex G.Don) D.J.Middleton - Fujian, Guangdong, Guangxi, Hainan, Sichuan, Taiwan, Tibet, Yunnan, Ryukyu Islands, Assam, Bangladesh, Bhutan, Arunachal Pradesh, Nepal, Cambodia, Laos, Thailand, Vietnam, Myanmar, W Malaysia
13. Urceola minutiflora (Pierre) D.J.Middleton - Cambodia, Laos, Thailand, Vietnam
14. Urceola napeensis (Quint.) D.J.Middleton - Laos, Thailand, Vietnam, Guangdong, Guangxi
15. Urceola polymorpha (Pierre ex Spire) D.J.Middleton & Livsh. – Cambodia, Laos, Thailand, and Vietnam
16. Urceola polyneura (Hook.f.) D.J.Middleton & Livsh. – southern Myanmar, Thailand, Peninsular Malaysia, Sumatra, and Borneo
17. Urceola quintaretii (Pierre) D.J.Middleton - Laos, Vietnam, Guangdong, Guangxi
18. Urceola rosea (Hook. & Arn.) D.J.Middleton - Cambodia, Laos, Thailand, Vietnam, Laos, W Malaysia, Java, Sumatra, Fujian, Guangdong, Guangxi, Guizhou, Hainan, Hunan, Sichuan, Taiwan, Yunnan
19. Urceola torulosa Hook.f. - W Malaysia, Sumatra, Borneo
20. Urceola tournieri (Pierre) D.J.Middleton - Yunnan, Nepal, Bhutan, Assam, Laos, Myanmar, Thailand, Vietnam
21. Urceola xylinabariopsoides (Tsiang) D.J.Middleton - Hainan, Vietnam
