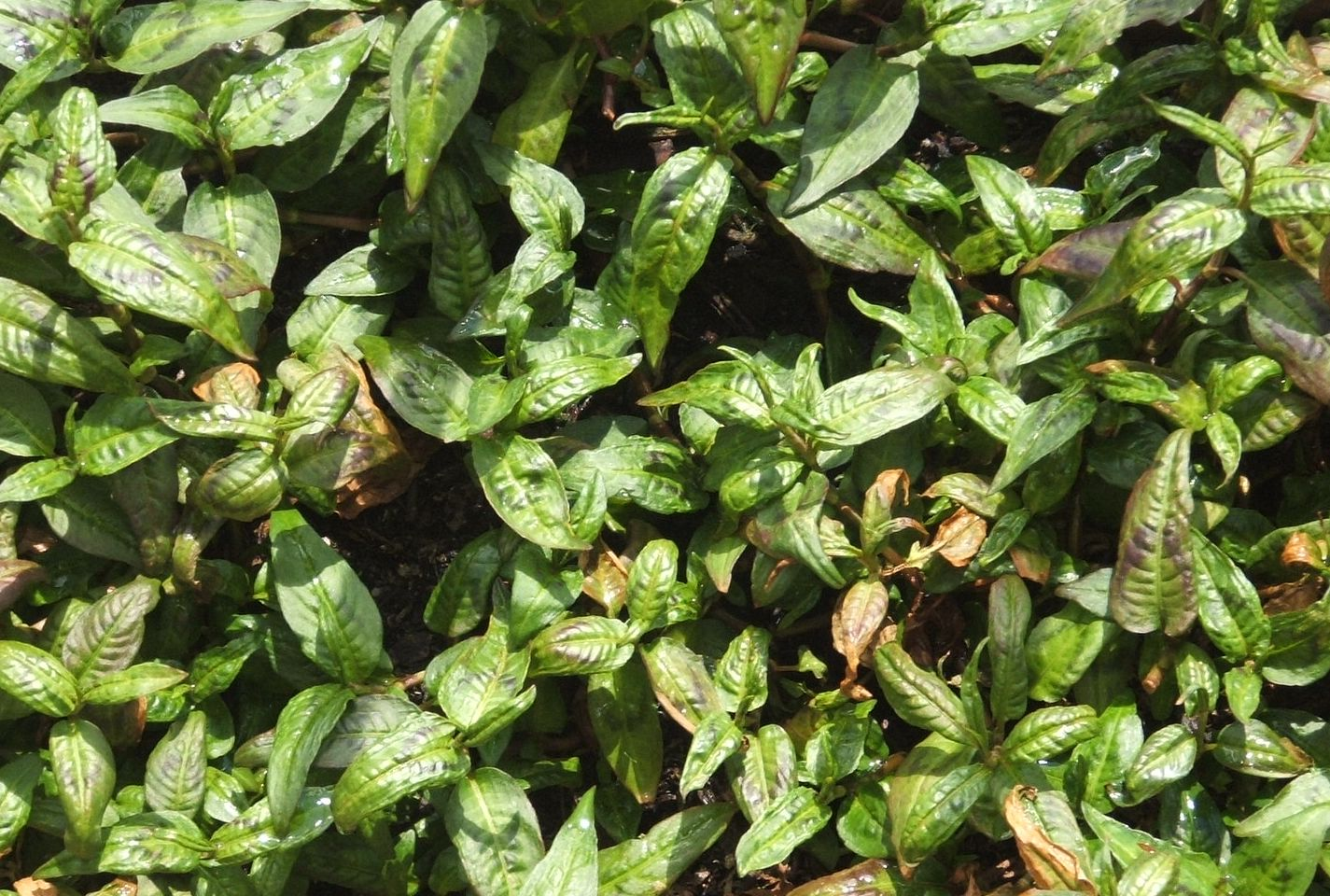

Scientific classification
- Kingdom: Plantae
- Clade: Tracheophytes
- Clade: Angiosperms
- Clade: Eudicots
- Order: Caryophyllales
- Family: Polygonaceae
- Genus: Persicaria
- Species: P. odorata

Binomial name
- Persicaria odorata (Lour.) Soják 1974

Synonyms
- Polygonum odoratum Lour. 1790

= Persicaria odorata =

Vietnamese coriander

Species of plant

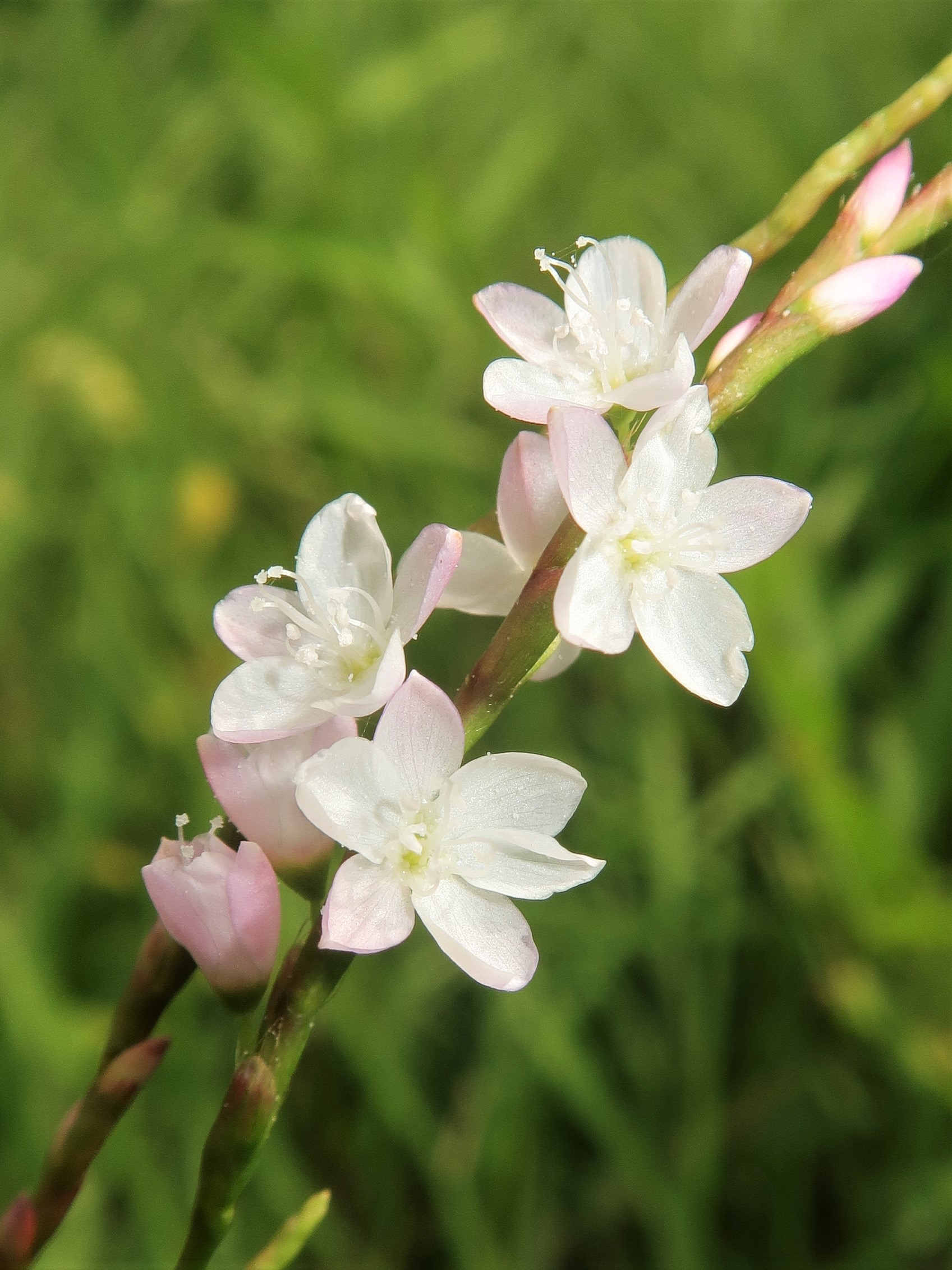
Persicaria odorata flowering

Persicaria odorata is a species of flowering plant in the family Polygonaceae. Its common names in English include Vietnamese coriander, laksa leaf, Vietnamese cilantro, praew leaf, hot mint, Cambodian mint and Vietnamese mint, Its leaves are used in Southeast Asian and Northeast Indian cooking.

Although some of its common names refer to mint, Vietnamese coriander is unrelated to the mint genus Mentha, nor is it in the mint family Lamiaceae, but its general appearance and fragrance are reminiscent of them. It is also not closely related to coriander (family Apiaceae). Persicaria is in the family Polygonaceae, collectively known as "smartweeds" or "pinkweeds". The similarities in the tastes and smells between Persicaria and coriander and mint may be an example of convergent evolution.

== Distribution ==
It is native to Cambodia, China (North-Central, South-Central and Southeast, Hainan), Japan, Korea, Laos, Malaysia, Myanmar, the Ryukyu Islands, Taiwan, Thailand, and Vietnam.

== Food uses ==
The leaf is primarily associated with Vietnamese cuisine, where it is known as rau răm and commonly eaten fresh in salads (including chicken salad) and in raw gỏi cuốn, as well as in some soups such as canh chua and bún thang, and stews, such as fish kho tộ. It is also popularly eaten with trứng vịt lộn (fertilized duck egg).

In Malaysia, Singapore and Indonesia the shredded leaf is an essential ingredient of several variations of laksa, a spicy noodle soup, so much so that the leaf is commonly nicknamed "laksa leaf" (daun laksa). The leaves are otherwise known in Malay and Indonesian as daun kesum and used in dishes like nasi kerabu and asam pedas.

In the cuisine of Cambodia, the leaf is known as chi krasang tomhom (Khmer: ជីរក្រសាំងទំហំ) and is used in soups, stews and salads. It is also used in naem (ណែម), Cambodian summer rolls.

In Laos, and certain parts of Thailand (where the leaf is named phak phai), the leaf is eaten with raw beef larb (Lao: ລາບ).

In Burmese cuisine, the leaves are called phetphe (ဖက်ဖယ်) and used in various Burmese curries. The leaves are locally known as phak phai in neighbouring Manipur, India. The Khoibu community grinds the leaves with ghost pepper and a nut locally known as "bonra" to make a spicy side dish.

In Australia, Persicaria odorata is being investigated as a source of essential oil (kesom oil). Research conducted in North East Victoria has shown that kesom oil has potential applications in the flavor and fragrance industry, particularly as a natural source of aliphatic aldehydes.

== Characteristics ==
Vietnamese coriander is a perennial plant that grows best in tropical and subtropical zones in warm and damp conditions. In advantageous conditions, it can grow up to 15–30 cm (6–12 in) in height and spread up to 60 cm (24 in). The top of its leaf is dark green, with chestnut-colored spots, while the leaf's bottom is burgundy red. The stem is jointed at each leaf. In Vietnam, it can be cultivated or found in the wild. It can grow very well outside in summer in nontropical Europe. It prefers full sun and well-drained soil. For colder climate zones, they should be brought inside for the winter and treated as a house plant. For climate zones that have milder winters, it will survive outside, although its growth may slow down. It rarely flowers outside the tropics.

== Components ==
Vietnamese coriander oil contains aldehydes such as decanal (28%), and the alcohols dodecanol (44%) and decanol (11%). Sesquiterpenes such as α-humulene and β-caryophyllene comprise about 15% of its oil.

C-Methylated homoisoflavanones (3-(4'-methoxy-benzyl)-5,7-dihydroxy-6-methyl-8-methoxy-chroman-4-one, 3-(4'-methoxy-benzyl)-5,7-dihydroxy-6,8-dimethyl-chroman-4-one, 3-(4'-hydroxy-benzyl)-5,7-dihydroxy-6,8-dimethyl-chroman-4-one, 3-(4'-hydroxy-benzyl)-5,7-dihydroxy-6-methyl-8-methoxy-chroman-4-one and 3-(4'-hydroxy-benzyl)-5,7-dihydroxy-6-methyl-chroman-4-one) can be found in the rhizomes of P. odoratum.

== Traditional uses ==
No scientific studies have measured P. odorata's effects on libido. Traditionally, in Vietnam, the herb is believed to repress sexual urges. A saying in Vietnamese states, "rau răm, giá sống" ("Vietnamese coriander, raw bean sprouts"), which refers to the common belief that Vietnamese coriander reduces sexual desire, while bean sprouts have the opposite effect. Many Buddhist monks grow coriander in their private gardens and eat it frequently, believing it helps them remain celibate.

== Cultivation ==
North American sources state Persicaria odorata can be grown outside in frost free parts of USDA Zones 9–11 in moderately fertile soil which is poor or well-drained but will remain moist to wet. It can tolerate full sun if there are breezes and boggy moist soil. However, part shade is desirable and it can be used as groundcover under trees. If winter temperatures drop below 7 °C (45 °F) overwintering indoors is possible if humidity can be maintained. Northern European sources proscribe all but summer under glass as it is hardy to H1C (minimum 5–10 °C (41–50 °F)) with West and South facing aspects preferable.

Persicaria odorata grows up to 6 to 18 inches (150 to 460 mm) tall and wide in US and UK sources state 1 by 1.5 metres (3 ft 3 in × 4 ft 11 in) are possible in 2 to 5 years.

Pests and diseases are not regarded as being problematic and it is even resistant to deer and rabbit.

== Propagation ==
Propagate by seed in autumn or spring but flowering and seed harvests are rare in non-tropical climes. In summer, propagation via semi-ripe cuttings should be straightforward. Rooting cuttings in water is so easy that North American sources recommend against overwintering indoors where humidity cannot be maintained. Rather, source fresh bunches of rau răm in early spring cost effectively from Asian supermarkets. Remove the young leaves at the very top of the stems and any large leaves along the stems. Trim the bottom off stems to the first healthy internode and place in water until 1–2 centimetres (0.39–0.79 in) roots appear below the lowest node and then plant in soil. Expect to harvest around two months later.
