= Banana fritter =

Deep-fried battered banana or plantain

Banana Fritter
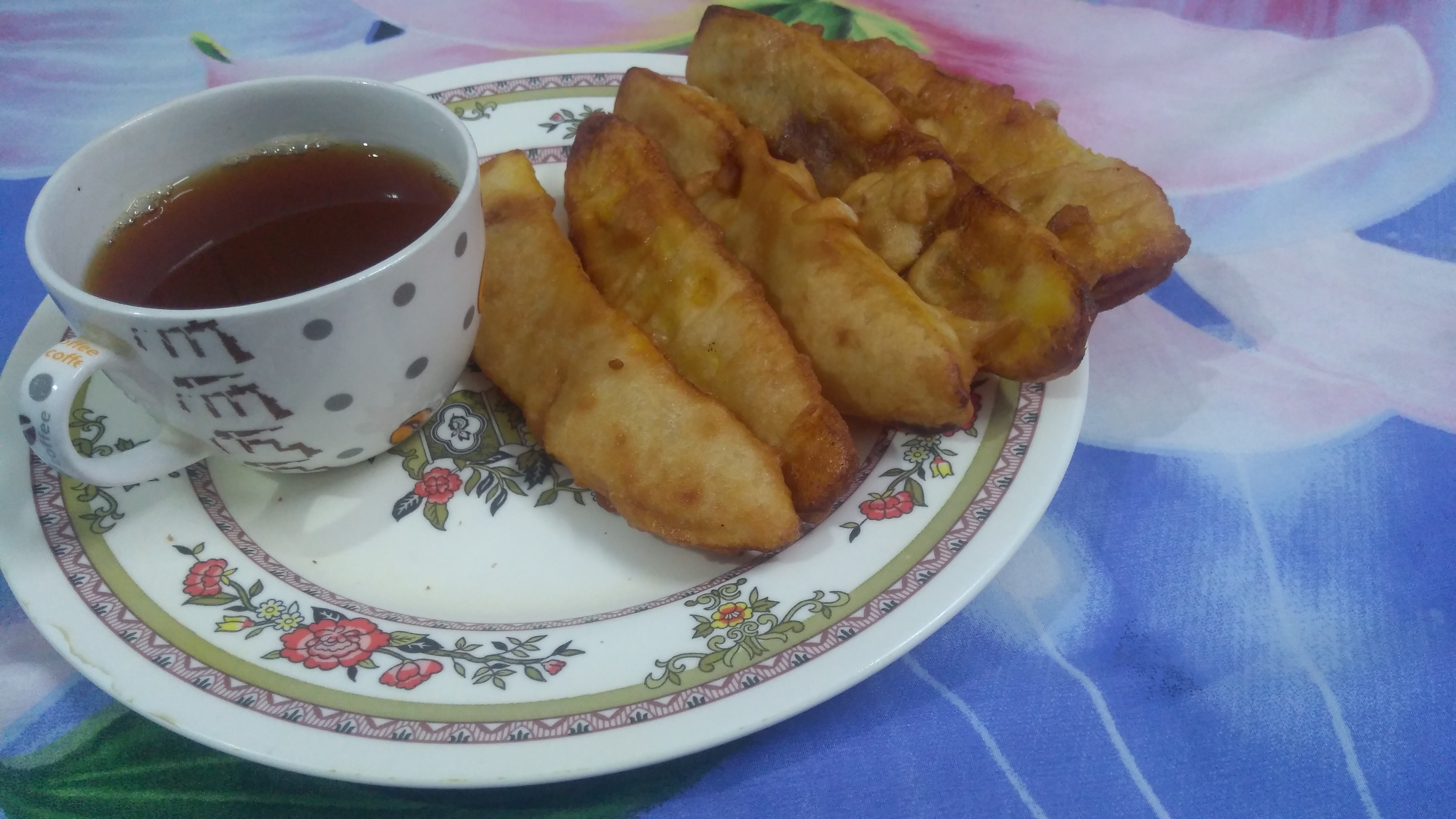
- Banana fritters served with tea in Kerala, India
- Type: Fritter
- Region or state: Southeast Asia, Madagascar, the Caribbean and the Indian subcontinent
- Main ingredients: Banana or plantain, batter

A banana fritter is a fritter made by deep frying battered banana or plantain in hot cooking oil. It is a common dish across Southeast Asia, Madagascar, and India.

== Varieties ==
=== Brunei ===
Banana fritters are a traditional snack in Brunei, where they are called cucur pisang. They are similar to pisang goreng in Indonesia and Malaysia. Cucur pisang madu, a variant of cucur pisang made with honey, are popular as a light afternoon meal (minum petang).

=== Cambodia ===
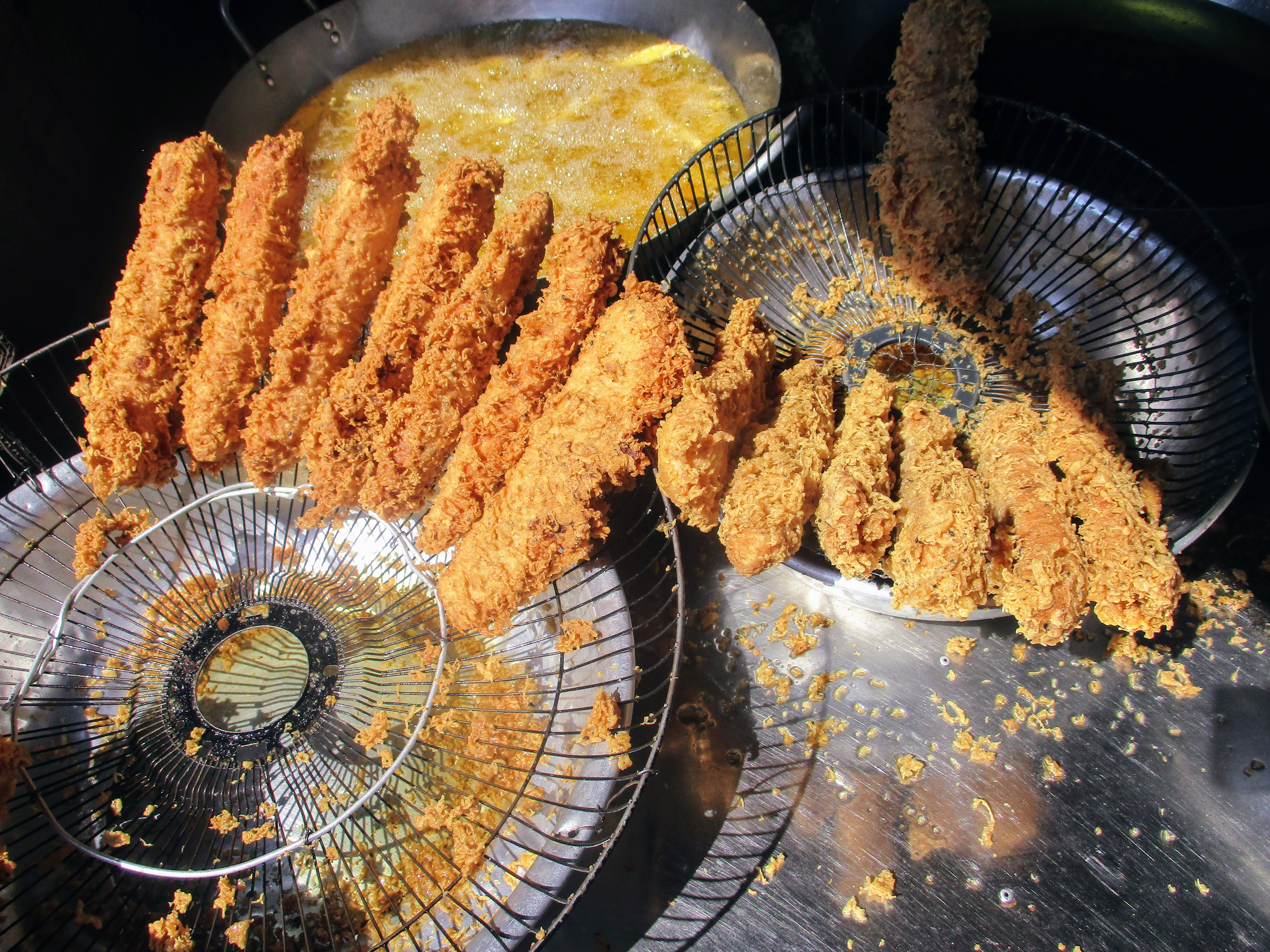
Cambodian banana fritters at a market in Siem Reap

In Khmer, banana fritters are called num chek chien (នំចេកចៀន; lit. 'fried banana cake'). They are made by dipping flattened bananas in a thick mixture of rice flour, sesame seeds, egg whites and coconut milk seasoned with salt and sugar and deep frying them in hot oil until crispy and golden. The Cambodian banana fritters are more savoury than sweet and are often eaten as a snack with coconut ice cream as a popular accompaniment. A famous banana fritter shop in Cambodia is Chek Chean Pises operating since 2000 that has two locations in Phnom Penh – at Mao Tse Tong Boulevard and Kampuchea Krom Boulevard.

=== India ===
==== South India ====
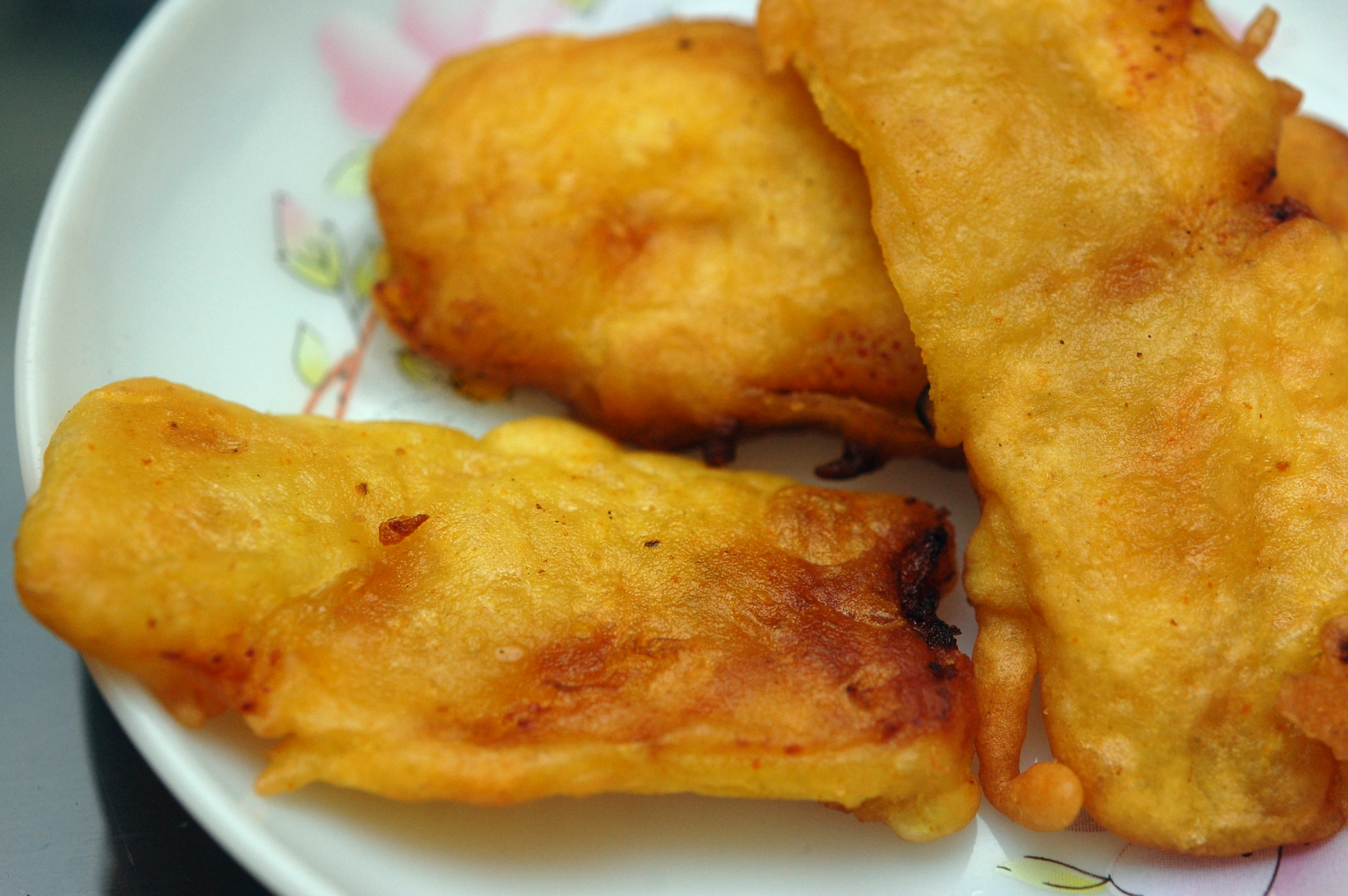
Vazhakkappam in Kerala, India

Vazhakkappam or pazham pori (Malayalam: പഴം പൊരി), also known as ethakka appam, is a fritter food with ripened banana or plantain and maida flour. A popular food item in South Indian cuisines, especially in Kerala, it is generally eaten as a breakfast or a snack. It is called as balekayi bajji (ಬಾಳೆಕಾಯಿ ಬಜ್ಜಿ) in Kannada, vazhakkay bajji in Tamil, and aratikaya bajji (అరటికాయ బజ్జి) in Telugu.

Pazham pori is principally made from bananas or plantain. Plantains are slit lengthwise after peeling and is dipped into a batter made from all-purpose flour, salt, turmeric powder and sugar. This is then deep-fried in oil until golden brown. In the other South Indian states of Karnataka and Tamil Nadu, it is however prepared using besan flour.

In the state of Kerala, banana fritters hold particular cultural and culinary significance and are commonly referred to as pazham pori or ethakka appam. They are typically prepared using ripe nendran bananas, which give the fritters a distinctive flavor and texture. Unlike many other types of fritters, they are traditionally served on their own often as an evening snack accompanied by tea and are not typically paired with curries or side dishes.

Pazham pori is served usually along with tea or chai as a snack in the evening. In some restaurants in Kerala pazham pori is served along with beef.

=== Indonesia ===
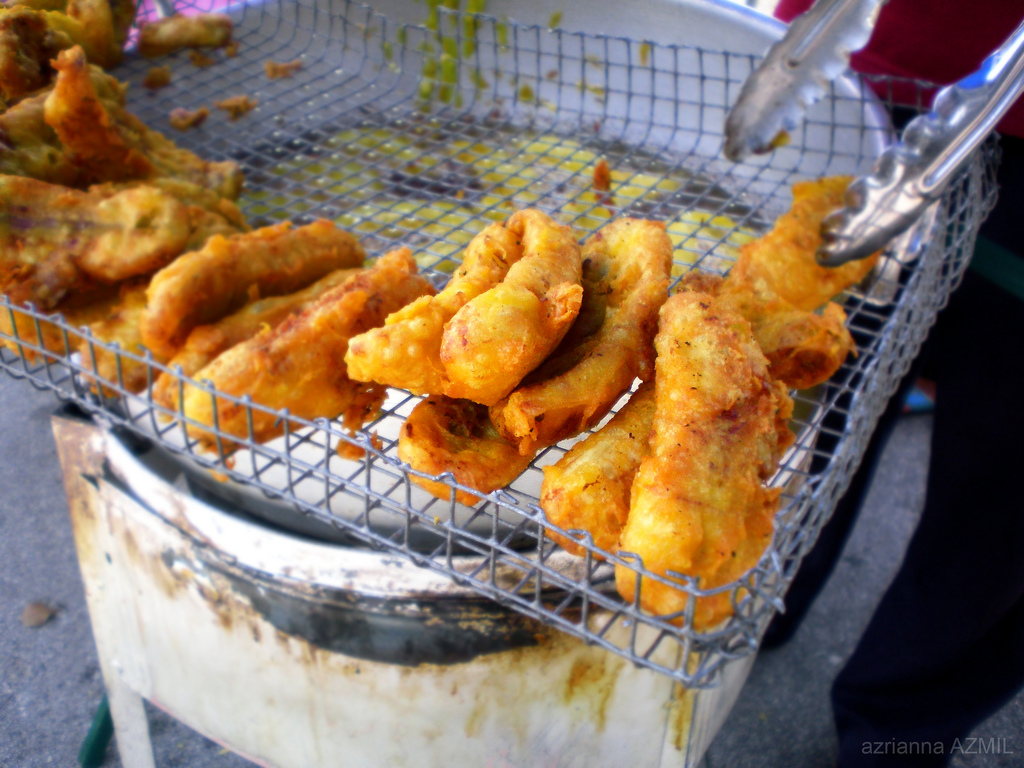
Indonesian roadside gorengan (fritter) peddler offering pisang goreng.

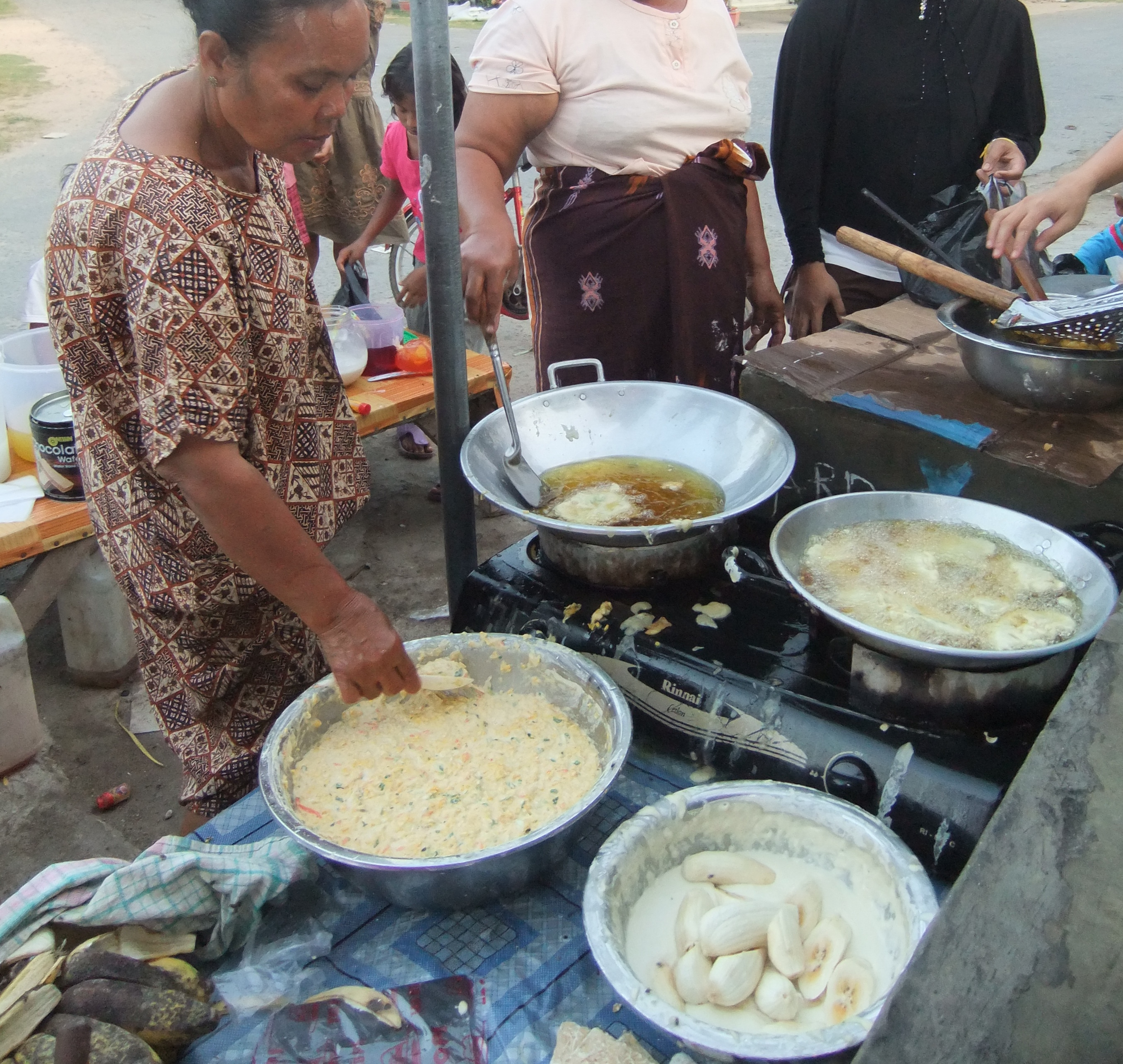
Frying pisang goreng in Karimun Jawa

In Indonesia, banana fritters are commonly known as pisang goreng. They are often sold by street vendors, In Indonesia pisang goreng are deep fried in ample of cooking oil; they might be coated with batter or not.

Plantain is often used instead of banana. Traditionally, some cultivars of banana such as pisang raja, pisang tanduk and pisang kepok are the most popular kinds of banana used for pisang goreng. These banana cultivars have a mild sweet and sour flavor and firm texture that will not crumble upon being fried. Pisang raja however, has a softer texture and a fragrant aroma. The banana is often battered and then deep fried in ample palm oil. Pisang goreng might be battered or plain deep fried. The batter most commonly uses a combination of flour, either wheat, rice flour, tapioca or bread crumbs. Several recipes might add coconut milk or milk and vanilla extract into the batter to add aroma. Most traditional street vendors will then sell them as is, without any additional ingredients or toppings. However, more upscale coffee shops, cafes and restaurants serve more sophisticated pisang goreng sprinkled with powdered sugar, cinnamon sugar, cheese, jam, condensed milk, chocolate or vanilla ice cream.

In Indonesia, it is consumed as a snack to accompany tea or coffee, either in the morning or late afternoon break. Traditional warung kopi (local coffee shops) often offer pisang goreng and other snacks, including fritters and kue to accompany coffee or tea.

Banana fritters along other kinds of fritters are sold on travelling carts or by street vendors throughout Indonesia. Other than pisang goreng, various kinds of ingredients are battered and deep fried such as tempeh, mendoan, tofu (tahu goreng), oncom, sweet potato, cassava chunk, cassava tapai, tapioca (cireng), vegetables (bakwan) and breadfruit.

Every region in Indonesia has developed various recipe for pisang goreng with a variety of different names, ingredients and cooking techniques. In Bali for example, pisang goreng is called godoh biu, in West Java it is called cau goreng, in Java gedhang goreng, in Sibolga pisang rakit and in Pontianak pisang kipas.

Pisang goreng is usually sold together with other gorengan fritters including fried tofu and tempeh. However, Pisang goreng Pontianak are widely popular in Indonesia with certain retail outlets exclusively selling only this type of banana fritters.

==== Pisang goreng variants ====
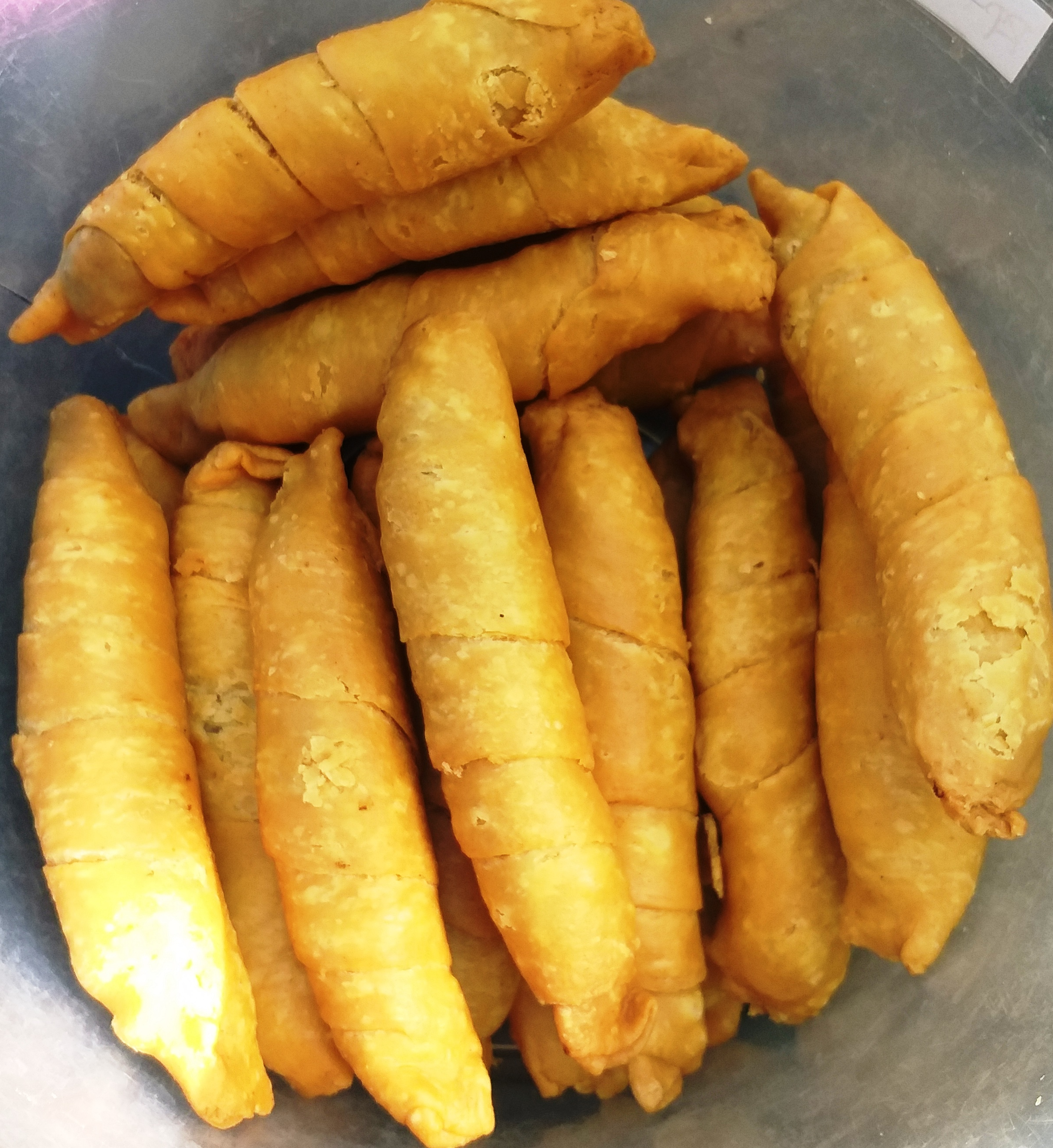
Pisang molen

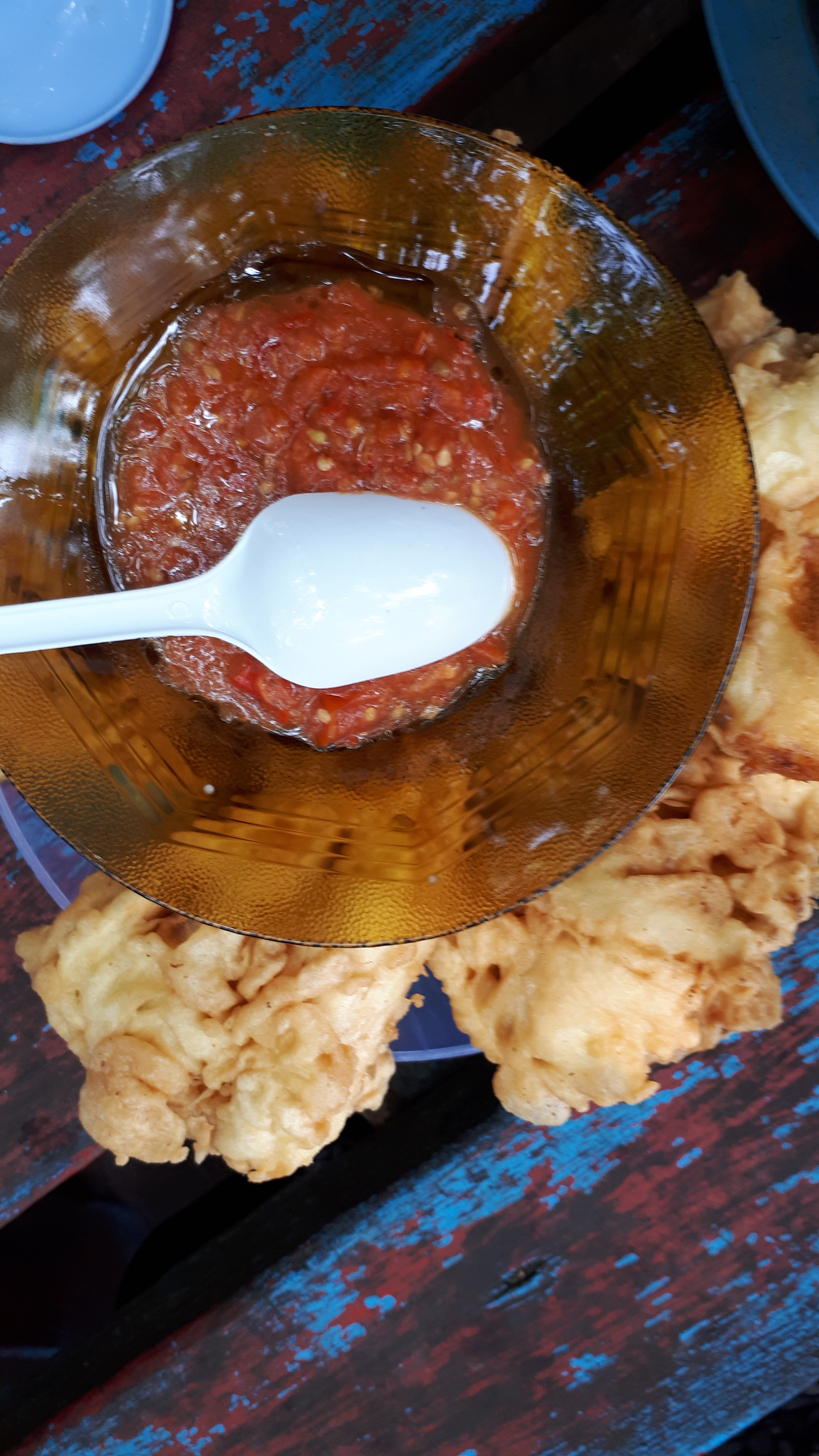
Pisang goreng Manado, unusually served with spicy sambal roa

Indonesia has many varieties of pisang goreng, including:

Pisang goreng kipas or Pisang goreng Pontianak
Refers to banana cut in the shape of a fan, battered, and deep fried. The term pisang goreng Pontianak is often used interchangeably with pisang goreng kipas, as both have a similar fan-like shape, but the former is often filled or served with kaya jam.
Pisang goreng pasir
Literally meaning "sandy fried banana", bread crumbs are added to the batter, resulting in grainy, crispy crumbs on the skin, giving it a similar texture to croquette.
Pisang goreng kremes
Javanese pisang goreng kremes is quite similar to pisang goreng pasir, but with a different batter composition and a different frying technique. The batter coating is made of rice flour, vanilla extract, and coconut milk, deep fried in an ample of hot cooking oil, creating crispy and crunchy kremes granules in the coating, and resulting in a sweet, fragrant aroma.
Pisang goreng madu
Literally meaning "honey fried banana", honey is added into the batter, and prior to serving honey is drizzled upon the fried banana. The color is rather dark due to the caramelised honey.
Pisang molen
Derived from Dutch influence in Indonesia, pisang molen literally means "milled banana". Unlike other batter-coated pisang goreng, pisang molen is wrapped around in tape-shaped thin pastry dough prior to frying, creating a crunchy texture on the outside similar to pastry skin, while the banana inside remains moist and soft.
Pisang cokelat
Often colloquially abbreviated as piscok, it is a thin crepe skin filled with banana and chocolate sprinkles or chocolate condensed milk, folded and deep fried in a similar fashion to making spring rolls. It is almost identical to the Filipino turon.
Pisang embal
Kei pisang goreng is similar to other batter-coated pisang goreng, but using embal (tapioca or cassava starch) in its batter. It served with sambal.
Pisang nugget
Small nugget-shaped fried banana. Its texture is akin to pisang goreng pasir in that it is coated in bread crumbs, however it is much smaller in size, similar in shape to chicken nuggets.
Pisang goreng telanjang
Literally meaning "naked fried banana", it is fried without any batter. Salted butter or margarine are added, and it may be topped with grated cheddar cheese. Pisang raja and pisang tanduk are the most suitable banana cultivars to be fried without batter.
Pisang goreng Manado
Manado pisang goreng is similar to other batter-coated pisang goreng, except it is served with sambal roa, a spicy chili paste made of smoked roa fish and fresh chilies.

Pisang goreng

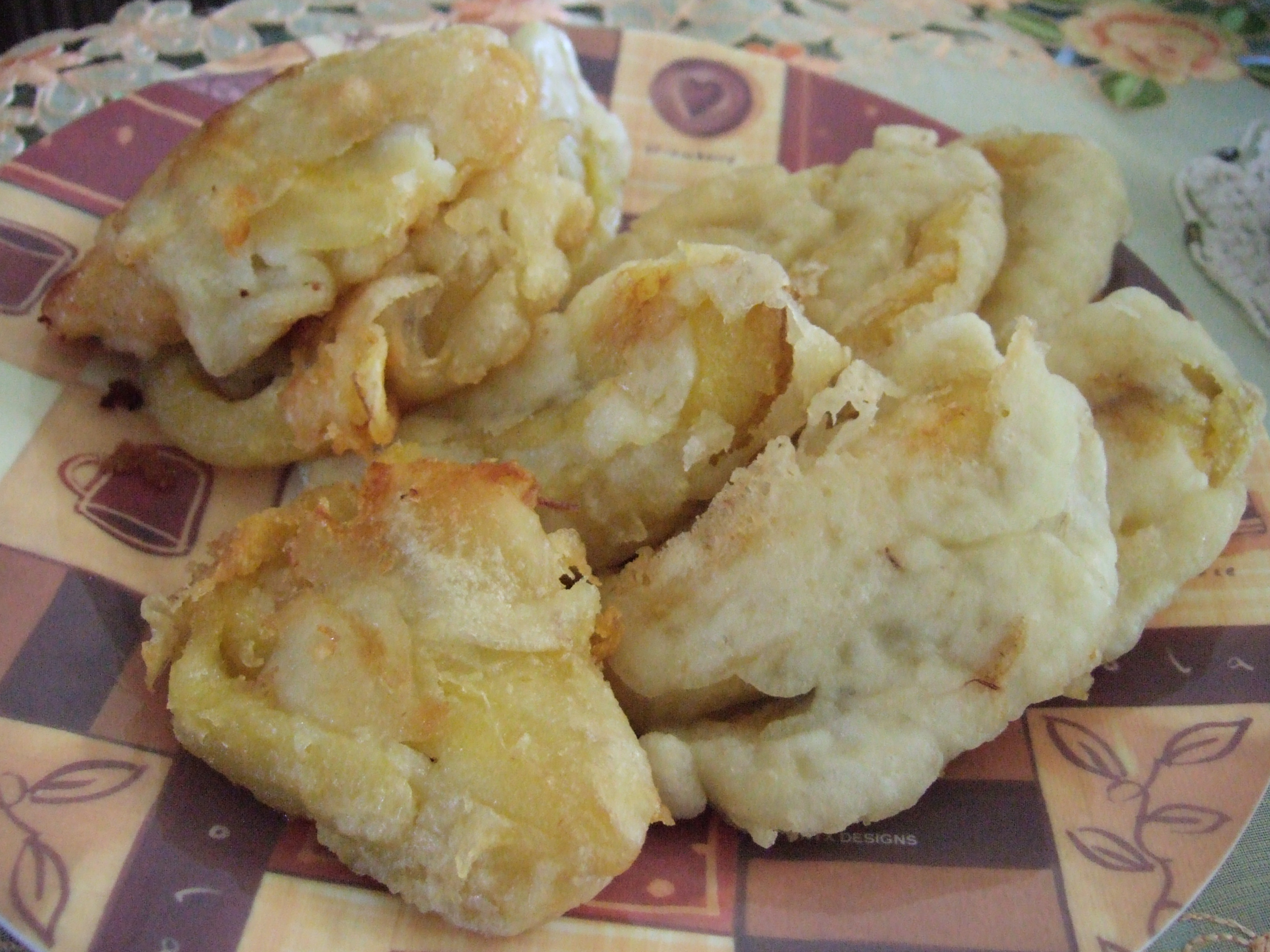
Pisang goreng with paler batter.

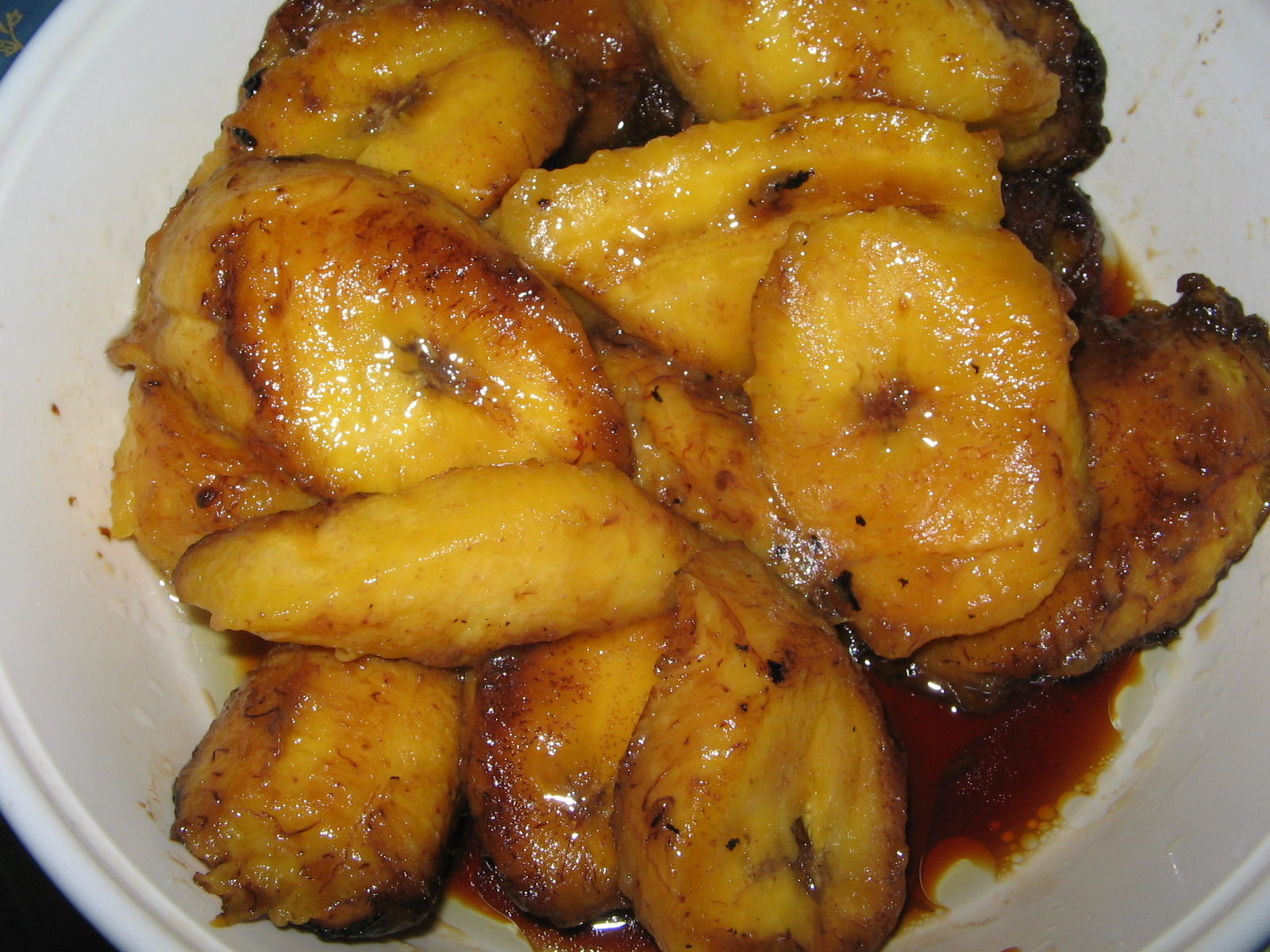
Pisang tanduk goreng without batter.

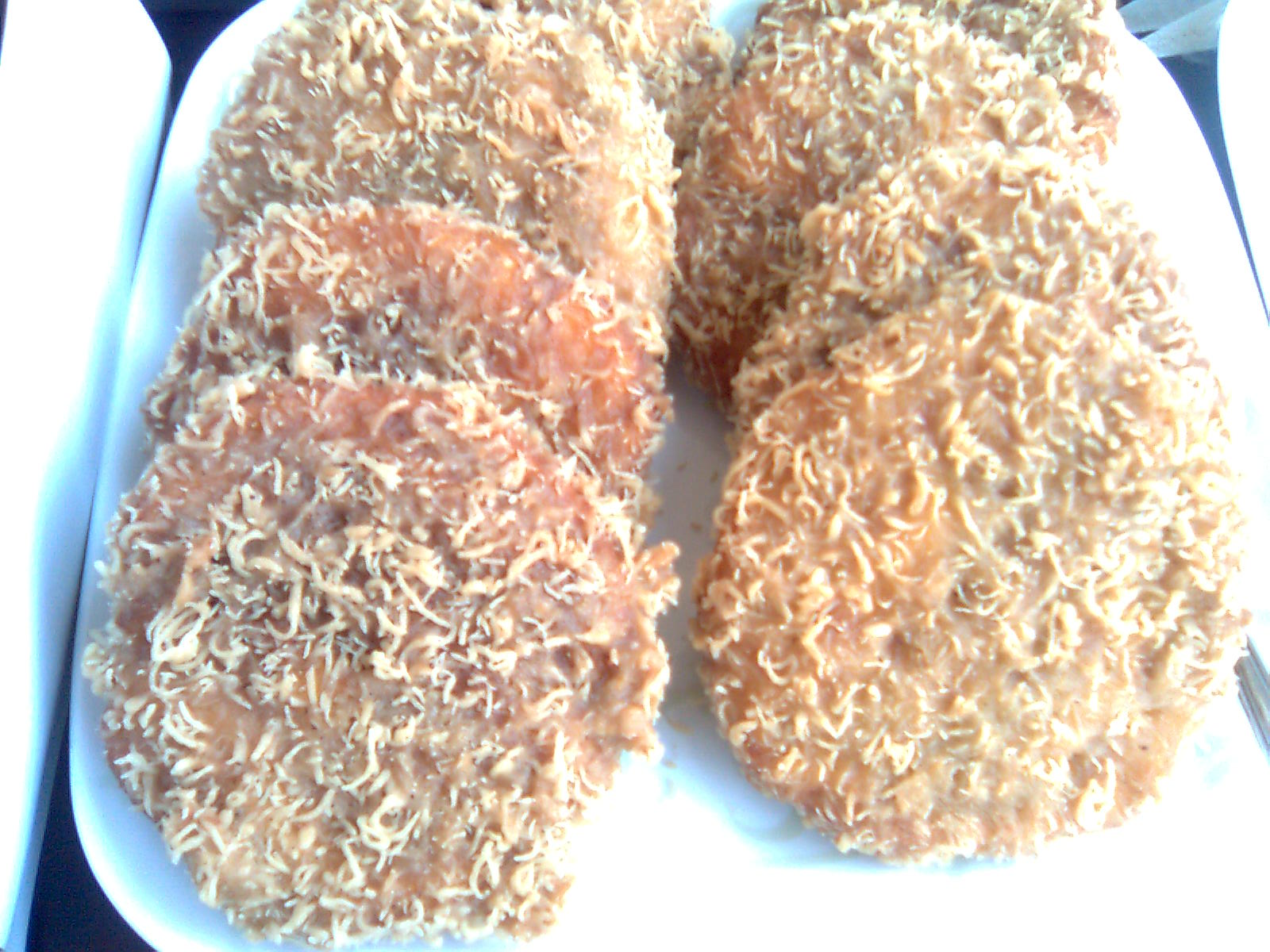
Disc-shaped flat pisang goreng.

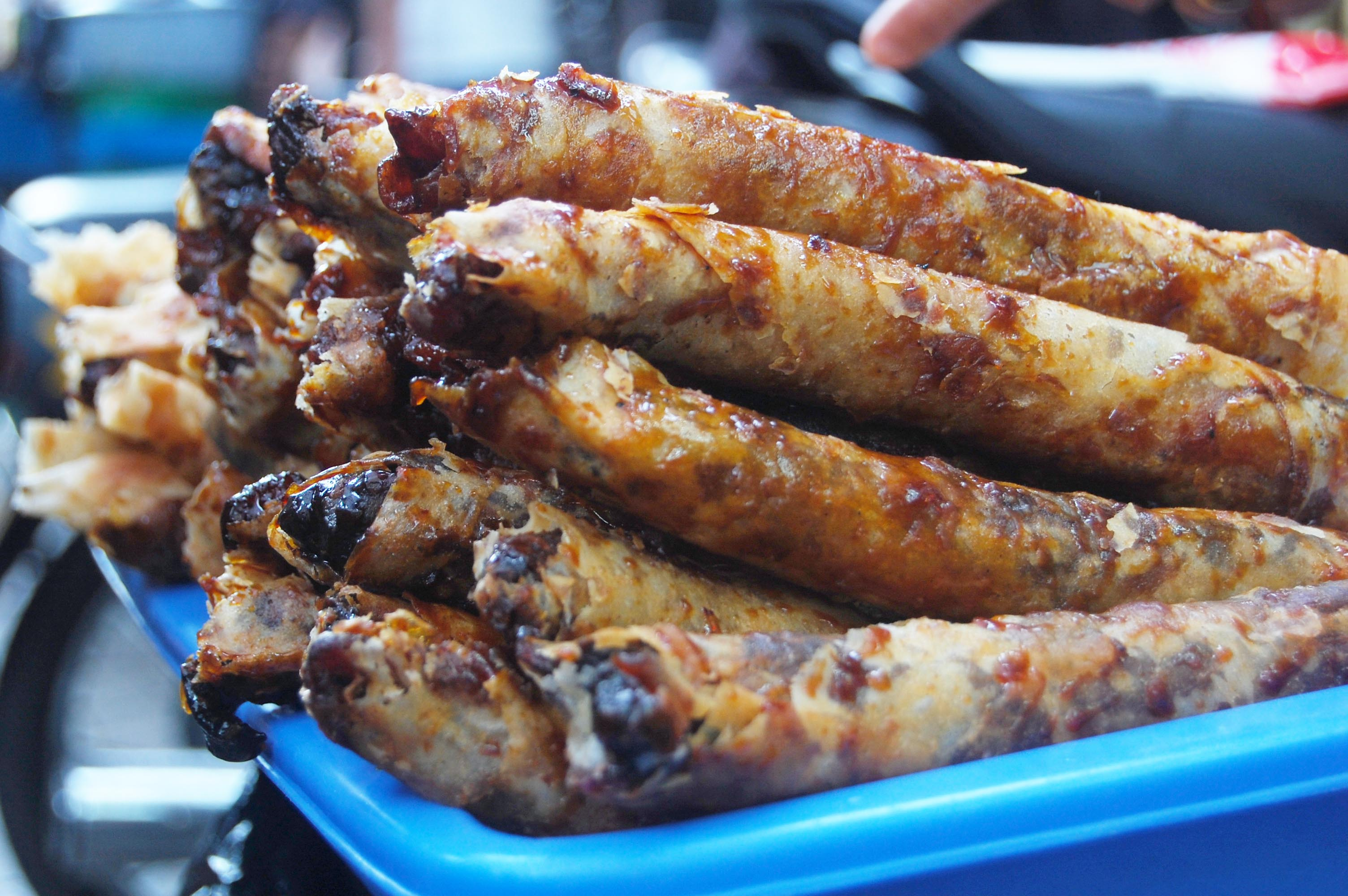
Piscok, pisang goreng with chocolate

=== Madagascar ===
In Madagascar, where it is called mofo akondro, it consists of a whole or sliced banana—most often a cooking banana or a plantain—that is simply peeled and then dipped in a fluid, sticky batter. This batter, which serves as a coating, is traditionally made from wheat or rice flour, eggs, water or milk, and optionally sugar and a hint of vanilla. The coated banana is then immersed in a bath of hot oil and fried until the exterior is golden and crispy, and the banana inside is cooked and tender.

Once fried, mofo akondro is primarily sold as street food. It is offered at a modest price by independent vendors, who sell it hot from market stalls or along busy thoroughfares, often to be eaten on the go as a quick and energizing snack.

=== Malaysia and Singapore ===
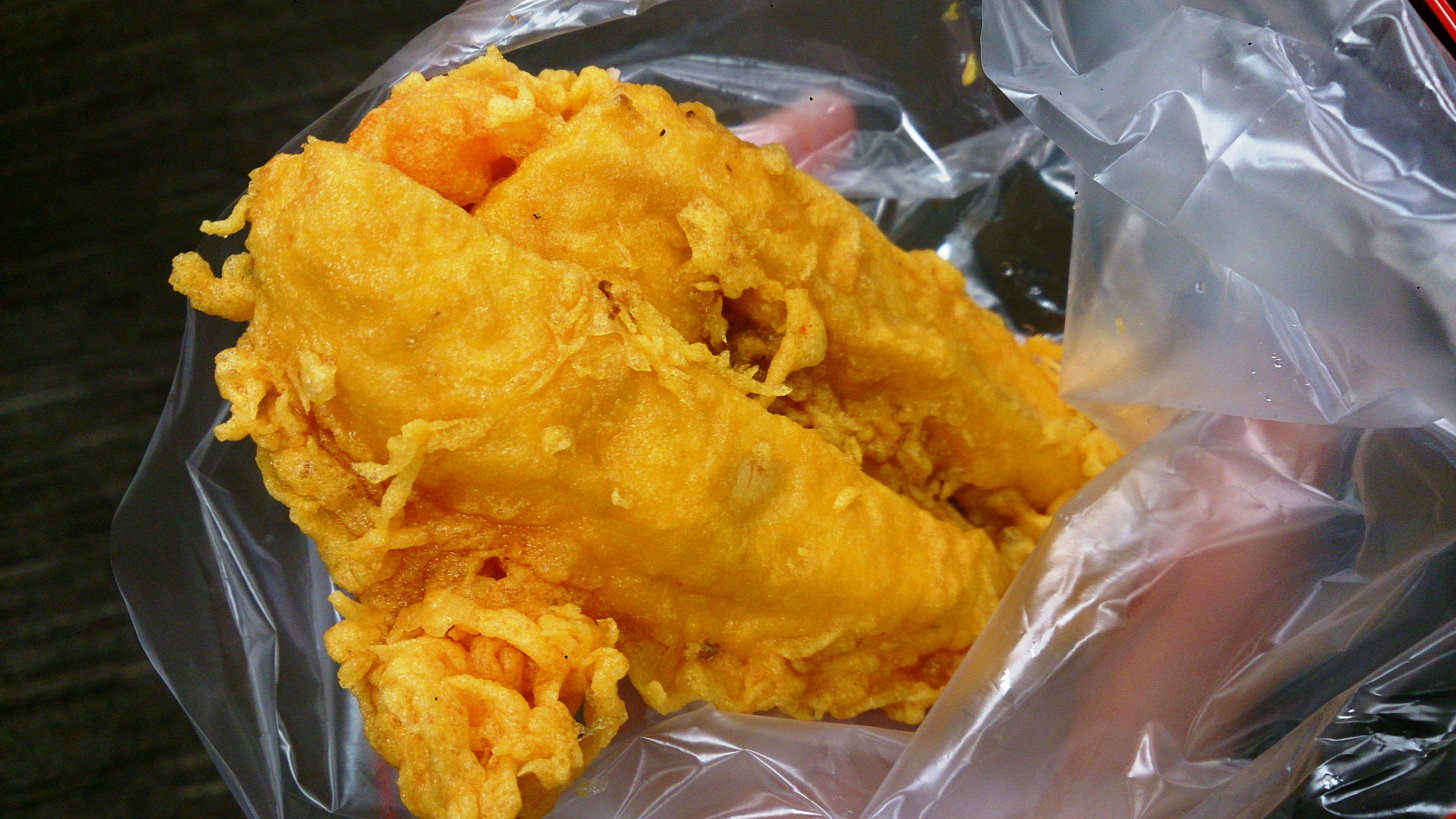
Pisang Goreng as its known

In Malaysia and Singapore, banana fritters are commonly known in the Malay language as pisang goreng. Other names may include cekodok pisang and jemput-jemput pisang. The style of banana fritters commonly found in these countries is made by deep frying battered plantain in hot oil. It is typically consumed as a snack in the morning and afternoon. They are often sold by street vendors, although it is also offered as a product at storefronts, dining establishments as well as Singapore's hawker centres. In Johor, Malaysia, pisang goreng is commonly served with sambal kicap, a spicy soy sauce dip that adds a savory and fiery twist to the traditional fried banana fritters.

=== Myanmar ===
A dish of banana fritter cooked in thick, spicy fish sauce and served with rice is claimed to have been a favourite dish of the former royal family of Myanmar.

=== Philippines ===
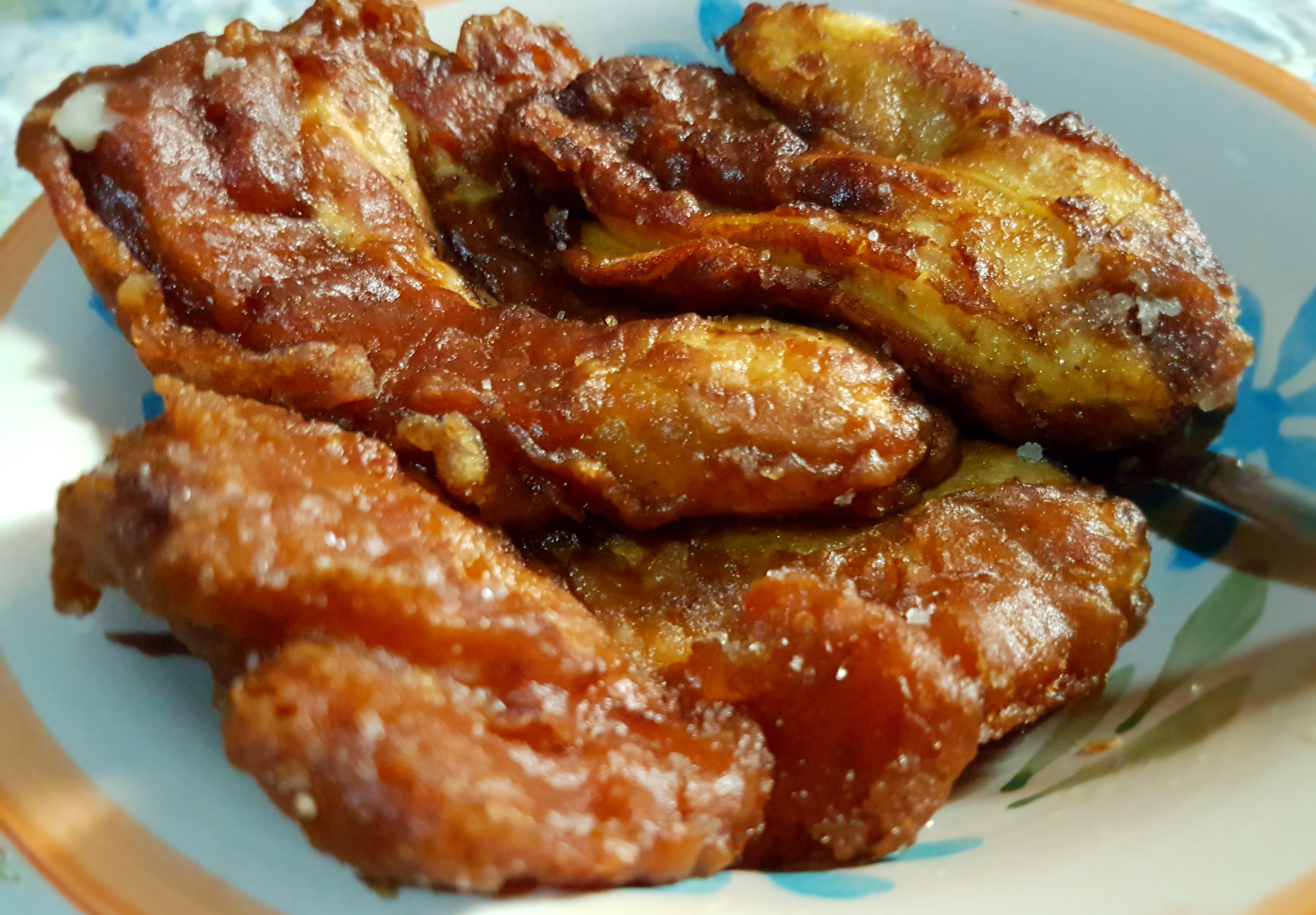
Philippines maruya

There are numerous fried banana dishes in Philippines. They are almost always made from saba bananas, a native cooking banana that is widely used in Filipino cuisine. Pritong saging are fried saba bananas (without batter) usually served with sugar or syrup. Bananas cooked with batter are a different dish known as maruya, which are more commonly made mashed or sliced very thinly and spread into a fan shape. However, the most common Filipino street food dishes made from banana are banana cue and turon. Banana cue are fried bananas coated with caramelized sugar and served on skewers; while turon is a type of fried dessert lumpia unique to the Philippines and is cooked in a crepe wrapper.

=== Suriname ===
In Suriname, this snack is also known as bakabana (meaning fried banana in Surinamese).

=== Thailand ===
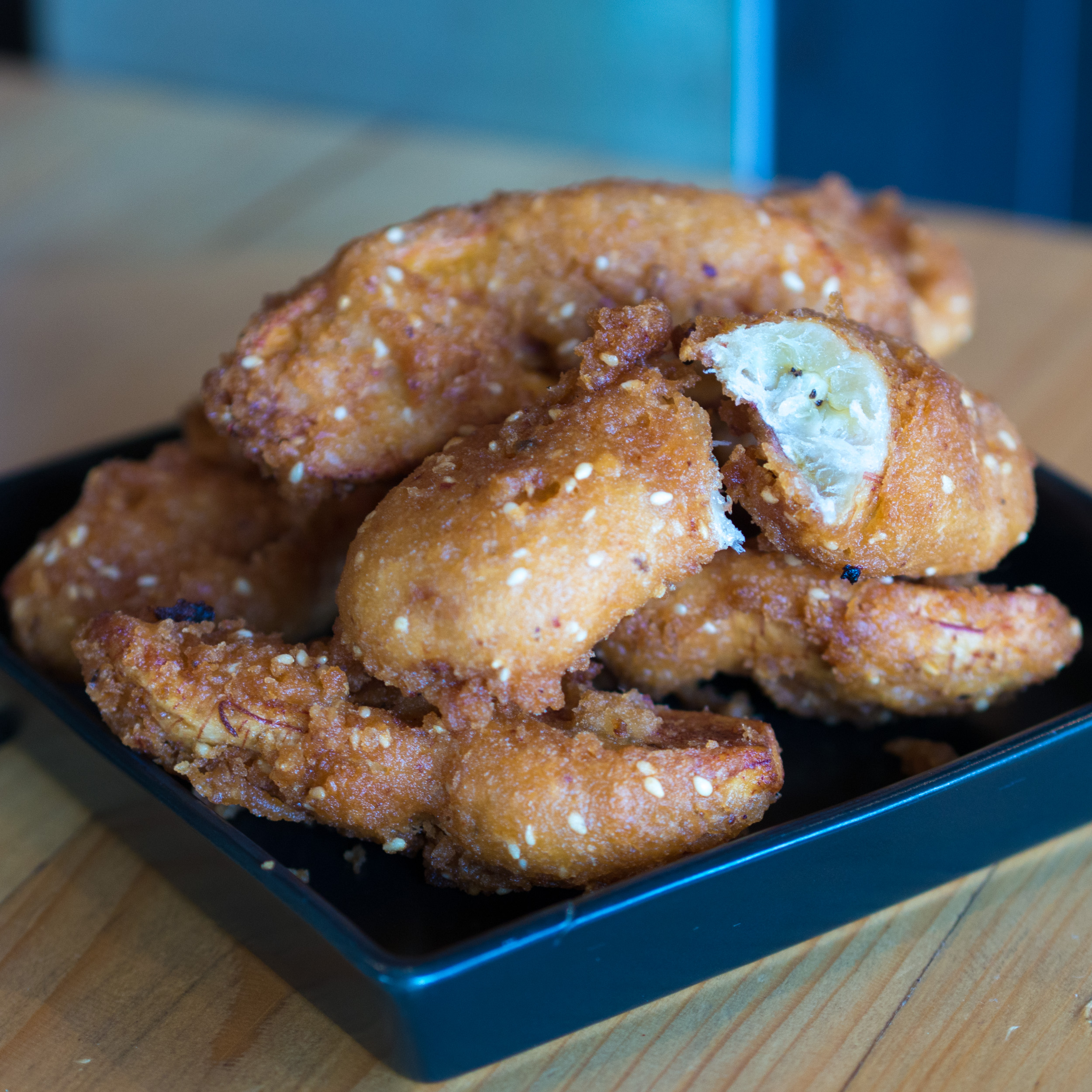
Thai banana fritters

Kluai khaek (Thai: กล้วยแขก, pronounced [klûa̯j kʰɛ̀ːk]), sometimes called kluai thot (กล้วยทอด, [klûa̯j tʰɔ̂ːt]), is a popular Thai street snack. Kluai khaek is made from fried, floured banana commonly topped with white sesame. It is commonly sold from street stalls, often with other snacks such as khanom khai nok kratha, khao mao thot, and fried taro.

The word kluai in Thai means "banana", and khaek means "guest" and is a colloquialism used for Indians, Muslims or Hindus — who may have provided a recipe on which these fritters were based.

One area famous for kluai khaek in Bangkok is around Lan Luang Intersection to Chakkraphatdi Phong Intersection, where it is referred to as Nang Loeng in the Pom Prap Sattru Phai District. Here, there are many kluai khaek shops, whose sellers wear aprons of different colours. They walk down the street carrying bags of bananas and sell to drivers passing through. In February 2018, Bangkok Metropolitan Administration (BMA) banned this type of trade on the streets.

=== Vietnam ===
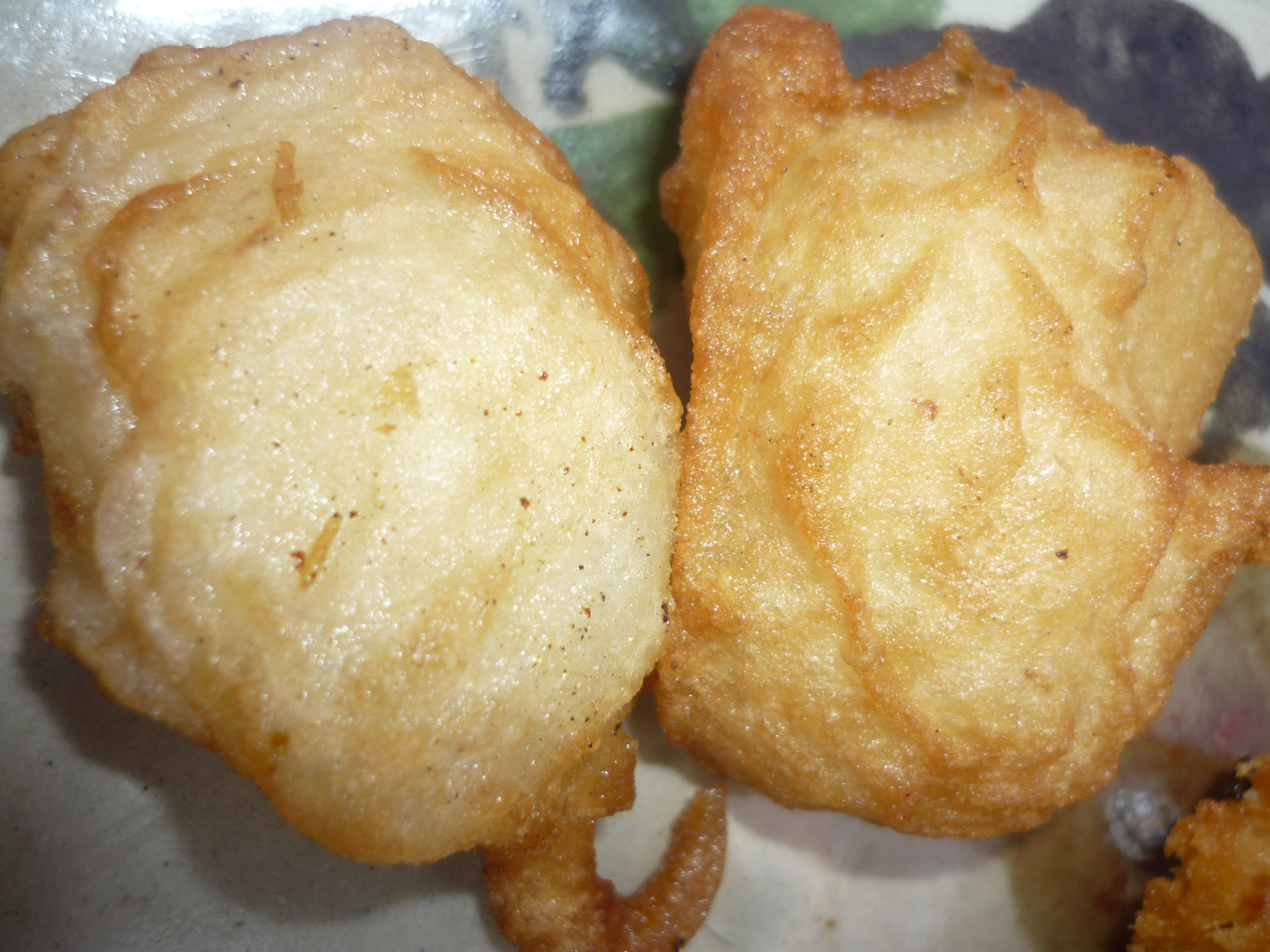
Vietnamese banana fritters

In Vietnamese, banana fritters are called chuối chiên. They are based on the French dessert banana flambée. After deep frying, Vietnamese banana fritters are drizzled with rum or rice wine and ignited to further crisp them.

== See also ==
- Banana cue, Filipino version of fried bananas
- Fried plantain, African version of fried bananas
- List of banana dishes
- Banana chips
