= Pisang cokelat =

Indonesian cuisine

Pisang keju
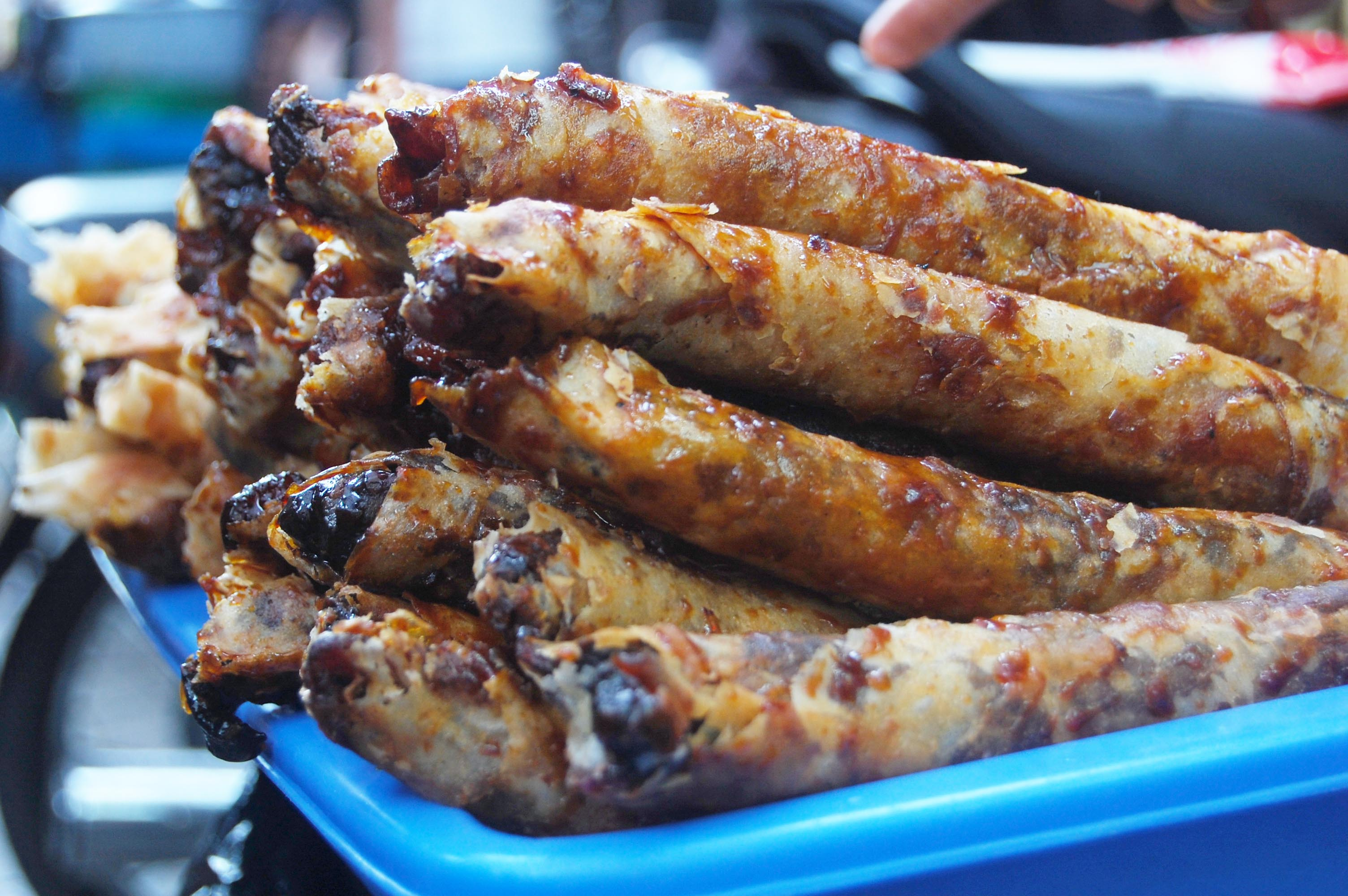
- Pisang cokelat, choco-banana spring roll
- Alternative names: Piscok
- Type: Snack
- Region or state: Indonesia
- Main ingredients: Banana, chocolate, lumpia skin
- Similar dishes: Turon

Pisang cokelat (chocolate banana in Indonesian) or sometimes colloquially abbreviated as piscok, is an Indonesian sweet snack made of slices of banana with melted chocolate or chocolate syrup, wrapped inside thin crepe-like pastry skin and deep-fried. Pisang cokelat is often simply described as "choco-banana spring rolls". It is often regarded as a hybrid between pisang goreng (fried banana) and lumpia (spring roll).

The type of banana being used is similar to pisang goreng: preferably pisang uli, pisang kepok or pisang raja sereh. The skin used for wrapping is usually the readily available lumpia skin. In Indonesia, pisang cokelat is regarded as a variant of pisang goreng, and categorized asgorengan (Indonesian assorted fritters) and sold together with other fried food such as fried tempeh, tahu goreng and pisang goreng. It is a common snack that can be found from streetside kakilima cart to cafés and upscale restaurants.

Pisang cokelat is almost identical to the Philippines' turon, which is actually a banana lumpia, except in this Indonesian version, chocolate content is mandatory.

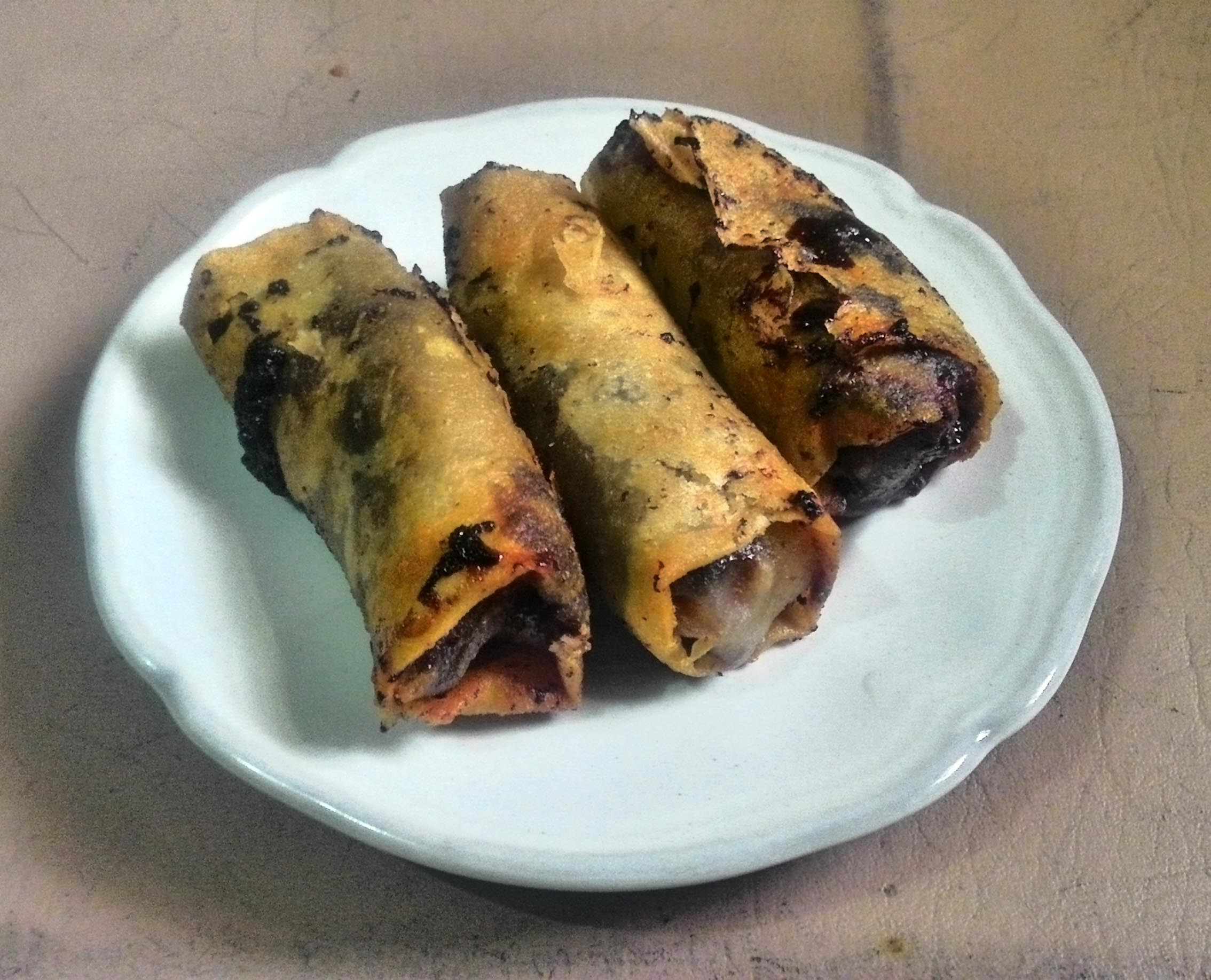
Three pieces of piscok being served

== See also ==
- Banana cue
- Fried plantain
- List of banana dishes
- Street food of Indonesia
