= Khanom khai nok kratha =

Fried sweet potato dough ball

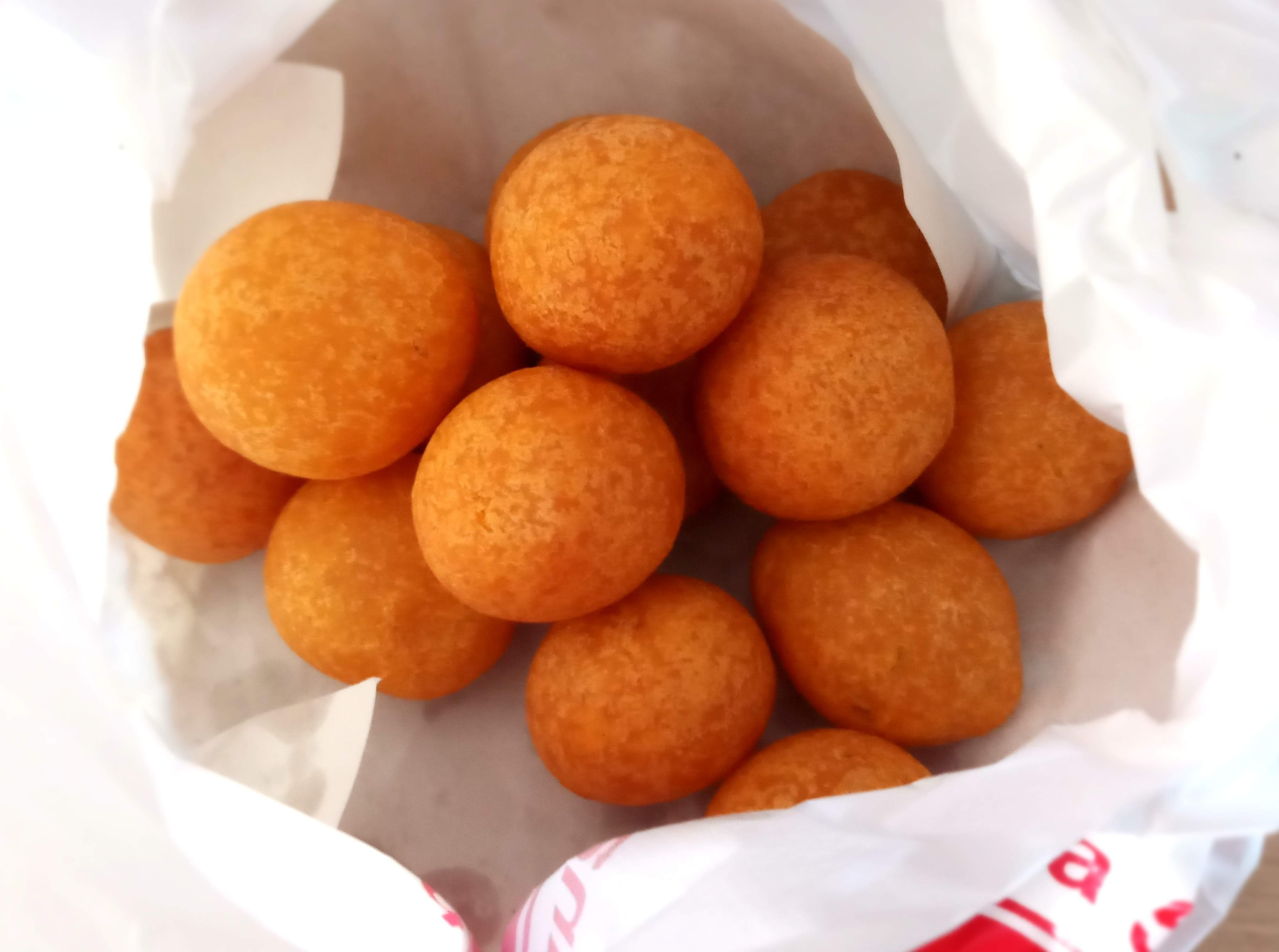
Khanom khai nok kratha

Khanom khai nok kratha (Thai: ขนมไข่นกกระทา, lit. 'quail egg snack/sweet') or khanom khai tao (Thai: ขนมไข่เต่า, lit. 'turtle egg snack/sweet', also shortened as khai tao; ไข่เต่า) is a traditional Thai dessert consisting of small deep-fried sweet potato balls, shaped to resemble quail eggs. The exact origins of the snack are unclear, though it is believed to have originated in southern Thailand, with possible Malay culinary influences. The dessert has since become a staple of Thai street food and is commonly served during festivals and special occasions. Its plant-based ingredients make it suitable for consumption during Buddhist festivals and vegetarian observances.

The dessert is traditionally prepared from mashed sweet potatoes mixed with tapioca starch, all-purpose flour, sugar, salt, and baking powder, sometimes enhanced with coconut milk or lime water for additional richness and crispiness. The dough is shaped into small balls and deep-fried until golden brown, with a characteristic hollow interior achieved by gentle pressing and rotation during frying. Sweet potato varieties such as orange, purple, and white may be used to create visual and flavor variations.

Several variations of the dessert exist. Khanom khai hong, or "swan egg snacks", are a larger version filled with seasoned mung beans and coated with sesame seeds or sugar, believed to have originated in the royal court during the reign of King Rama I. Across Asia, similar sweet potato-based desserts can be found, including Japan's daigaku imo and baked sweet potato desserts, Korea's fried sweet potato balls, and the Philippines' kamote cue.

Khanom khai nok kratha has gained renewed popularity in modern culture, particularly on social media platforms like Instagram and TikTok, where its vibrant colors and visually appealing presentation have drawn attention.

== History ==
Although it is generally accepted that khanom khai nok kratha originated in Southern Thailand its precise origins are still unknown given that similar desserts are found in Malaysian cuisine some culinary historians speculate that there may have been malay influences since then the dish has proliferated throughout Thailand and established itself as a mainstay of Thai street food culture.

In Thai culture, khanom khai nok kratha is a dish that is occasionally served during festivals and other special events. Its plant-based ingredients have contributed to its popularity by making it appropriate for consumption during buddhist festivals and other times when vegetarianism is customarily noticed the desserts broad appeal across various social and economic groups can be attributed in part to its affordability and accessibility

It's interesting to note that, despite its name, Khanom Khai Nok Kratha is essentially different from the majority of other Thai "Khanom khai" desserts, with the exception of Khanom Khai Hong, in that it doesn't actually contain eggs. Its name, "khai" (egg), only describes its size and shape, which is similar to quail eggs.

== Etymology ==
Khanom Khai Nok Khratha means "dessert snack shaped like a quail's egg." The physical characteristics of the fried sweet potato dough balls are reflected in this name.

== Preparation ==
=== Ingredients ===
Sweet potatoes are mashed to form the base of the dough..Tapioca starch provides texture. All-purpose flour may be replaced with wheat-free alternatives such as cornstarch or corn flour, which also act as binding agents. Other ingredients include sugar, salt and baking powder.

=== Preparation method ===
Sweet potatoes are typically peeled, rinsed, and chopped into small pieces before steaming for 15-20 minutes, or until completely cooked. Pieces about two inches long cook faster and are done when readily penetrated with a fork. After cooling, the cooked sweet potatoes are mashed until smooth. A fine mesh colander or strainer can be used to remove fibrous centers for a smoother texture.

In traditional preparation, tapioca flour, all-purpose flour, sugar, baking powder, and salt are blended and sweet potato purée is added, followed by coconut milk at a time. Once formed, the dough is covered with a tea towel and left to rest for 20-30 minutes.

After resting, the dough is formed into logs, cut into small pieces, and shaped into ¾-inch balls. Each ball is approximately the size of a quail's egg, and consistent sizing enables even cooking throughout frying.

The dough balls are fried. Once they begin to float, they are lightly squeezed and turned in circular motions by the skimmer, which causes them to puff and form a hollow center.

=== Critical cooking techniques ===
Maintaining proper oil temperature is essential to the outcome. Excessive heat burns the exterior before the interior cooks, while insufficient heat causes greasiness and collapse. Frying time also influences appearance and texture; balls that shrink or wrinkle are undercooked and require additional time. Under-rested dough may produce deflated, concave balls. Gentle pressing and rotating during frying produce a light, airy texture and ensure even cooking.

=== Storage and shelf life ===
Like most deep-fried appetizers, Khanom Khai Nok Kratha is best enjoyed shortly after frying to maintain exterior crispness. After cooling, the texture softens and the balls may deflate. Extra dough can be carefully wrapped in plastic and refrigerated for three days or frozen for five to six weeks. Dough can also be chilled for a few hours before cooking, as long as it is firmly covered to avoid drying out. Before shaping or frying, refrigerated dough is brought to room temperature, and frozen dough is thawed for two to three hours.

== Variations ==
=== Primary Sweet Potato Variations ===
The traditional version of Khanom Khai Nok Kratha is made with orange-fleshed sweet potatoes, which provide natural sweetness and the characteristic golden color. In recent years, purple sweet potato balls have become increasingly popular for their vibrant hue, slightly distinct flavor, and higher anthocyanin content, which contributes additional nutritional value. Some vendors also combine multiple varieties, typically orange, purple, and white sweet potatoes, to create mixed-color assortments that enhance visual appeal and offer a range of subtle flavor differences within a single batch.

=== Regional and Cultural Variations ===
A notable variation of Khanom Khai Nok Kratha is Khanom Khai Hong (ขนมไข่หงส์), translated as “swan egg snacks.” This larger and more elaborate version differs from the traditional quail egg sized balls. Khanom Khai Hong is typically filled with a seasoned mung bean mixture, coated with sesame seeds or sugar after frying, and is approximately the size of a swan’s egg. The dessert is believed to have originated in the royal court during the reign of King Rama I. According to historical accounts, it was created by Royal Concubine Waen to satisfy the king’s craving for a similar snack, originally named Khanom Khai Hia (“monitor lizard egg dessert”) before being renamed to the more refined Khanom Khai Hong. Its flavor combines sweet and salty notes with a hint of peppery spiciness from the mung bean filling, while maintaining the same crispy exterior and soft interior characteristic of Khanom Khai Nok Kratha.
