= Turon (food) =

Sweet dish from Filipino cuisine

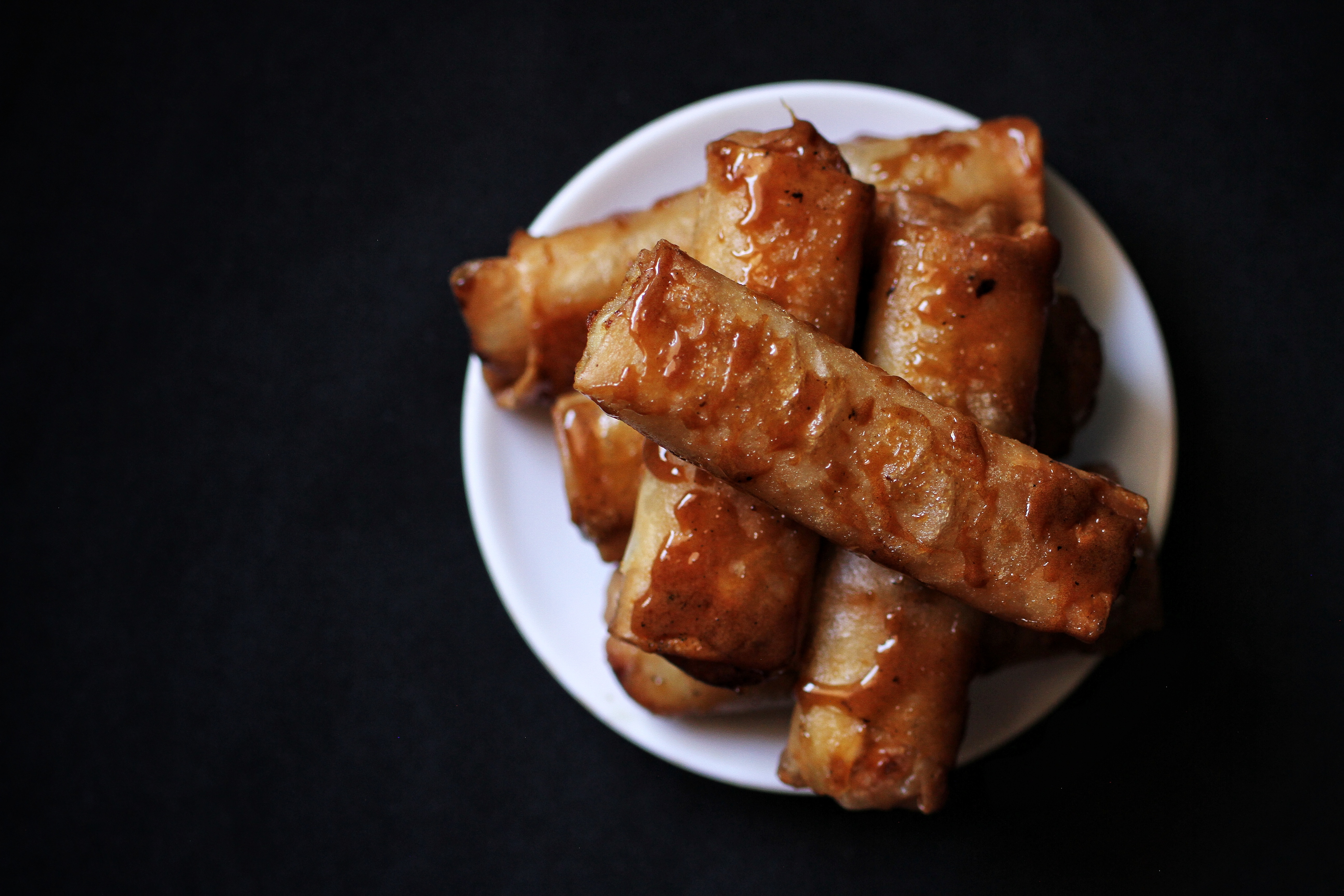
- Alternative names: Sagimis, turrón de banana, turrón de plátano, lumpiang saging
- Type: Snack
- Course: Dessert, Side dish
- Place of origin: The Philippines
- Serving temperature: Hot
- Main ingredients: Bananas, brown sugar

Turon (pronunciation: Too-ron) are a Filipino snack characterized as a sweet crispy roll that is filled with sugary caramelized banana and jackfruit, whose name is often confused with Spanish sweets Turrón due to shared language root with Spain. The dish originated in the plantation community during the Spanish occupation of the Philippines as a simple snack that can be created from cheap and widely available local ingredients.

Due to its simplistic nature, the dish grew in popularity as street food and snack for festival and celebration, especially in Hawaii after Filipino immigration in the 20th century, giving rise to local variation adjusted to local taste and commonly found ingredients.

== Etymology ==
Various type of Turrón

The word Turon (pronounced Tu-ron) can be traced to the name of the sweet name Turrón, which is a sweet originated from Spain whose name translates in its native tongue as “Nougat”.

This likely originates from the cultural influence during the Spanish occupation of the Philippines which makes the association between two dishes, specifically from the properties of its ingredients.

== Origin ==
Sugar mill at San Jose, Mindoro (c.1917)

The origin of the dish can be traced back to Spanish colonization of Philippines around the 16th century, which expand Philippines Sugarcane cultivation from a small part of their agriculture system into the full blown industries that make sugar the major export of Philippines in the 19th century, making sugar accessible to most of the country.

The development of Turon is believed to originate in the plantain community as a street food with an influence of Chinese cuisine that came with the Chinese immigrant whose arrival predates the Spanish. The dish is mostly focused on affordability, by creating a dish that can be easily produced using easily acquired and abundant ingredients like Banana, Jackfruit, and Sugar.

== Preparation ==
Turon after cooked, coated in caramelized sugar

Turon is a simple dish with a preparation method similar to egg roll. In its original rendition, Saba bananas are traditionally used as the filling of the dish due to its availability. The process is started by cutting Saba Banana and Jackfruit into small strips, coating the fruit strips with brown sugar then wrapping them inside a Lumpia wrapper and frying them in boiling cooking oil until the turon is crispy and golden brown.

By coating the filling with brown sugar, the frying process melt the sugar on the surface and coating them in sweet, caramelized sugar

Turon, fried in cooking oil until golden brown and crispy.

Turon on a stick, serve by street vender.

== Variants ==
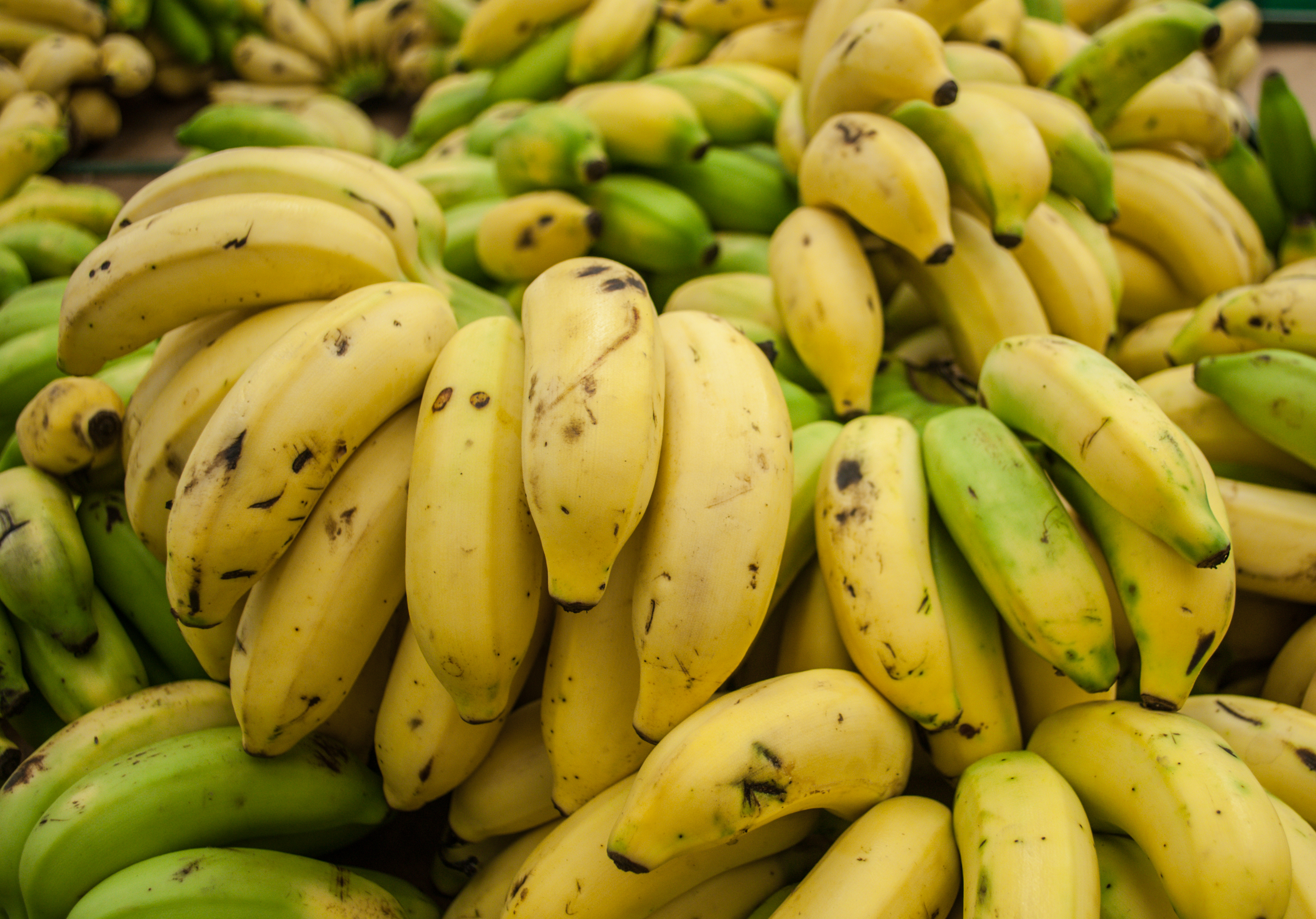
Saba banana, the original choice for Turon filling.

Turon has two known regional variations.

=== Hawaii Turon ===
After Its introduction to Hawaii during the immigration of Filipino people in the 19th century as migrant worker, Turon was adapted into Hawaii street food and changed according to the taste preference of the local, which is the switch from the original Saba Banana to the Apple Banana which is found locally across Hawaii, this gives its a sweeter and less starchy texture then its original counterpart.

Apple Banana, a type of banana more accessible outside of Philippines

=== Malabon Turon ===
In Malabon, the term "turrón" or "turon" instead refers to a fried, lumpia-wrapper-enveloped dessert filled with sweet mung bean while the term valencia is used for the banana-filled variety. Malabon banana turon are generally sold as valencia trianggulo, which are uniquely triangle-shaped.

== Dishes With Similar Preparation ==
=== Lumpia ===
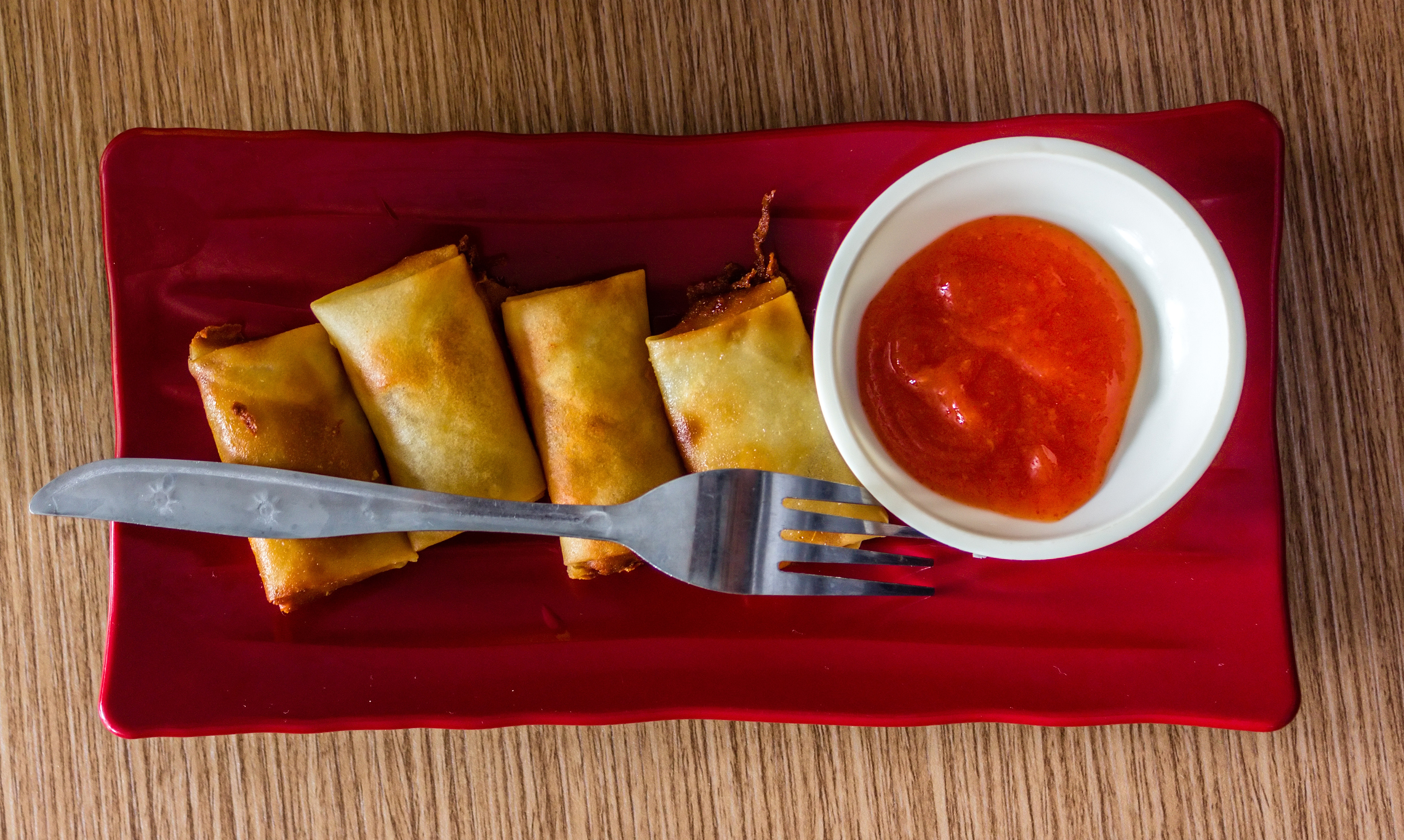
Tuna-filled Lumpia, serve with hot sauce

Believed to be the original inspiration of Turon, Lumpia is a group of appetizers originating from the idea of Spring roll, which are shared to the Philippines by Chinese traders. The dish name came from “Lunpai” which refers to a specific type of dish made from several vegetables and sliced omllette wrapped inside a thin pancake sheet then top with peanut sugar. The dish has many different variations which result from adaptation to each region's preferences, but generally, they are identified as sweet and savory filling warp inside wrapper made from flour.

=== Egg Roll ===
A vegetarian egg roll.

An American-Chinese appetizer and variant of Spring roll, traditionally a filling of various chopped vegetables and meats, warped inside a spring roll sheet and fried until crispy. The dish was created in the US around the early 19th century. The dish's namesake, despite the lack of egg in its recipes, is a result of marketing decisions inside the US to make the dish seem more accessible and less exotic to the average consumer

=== Lumpiang keso ===
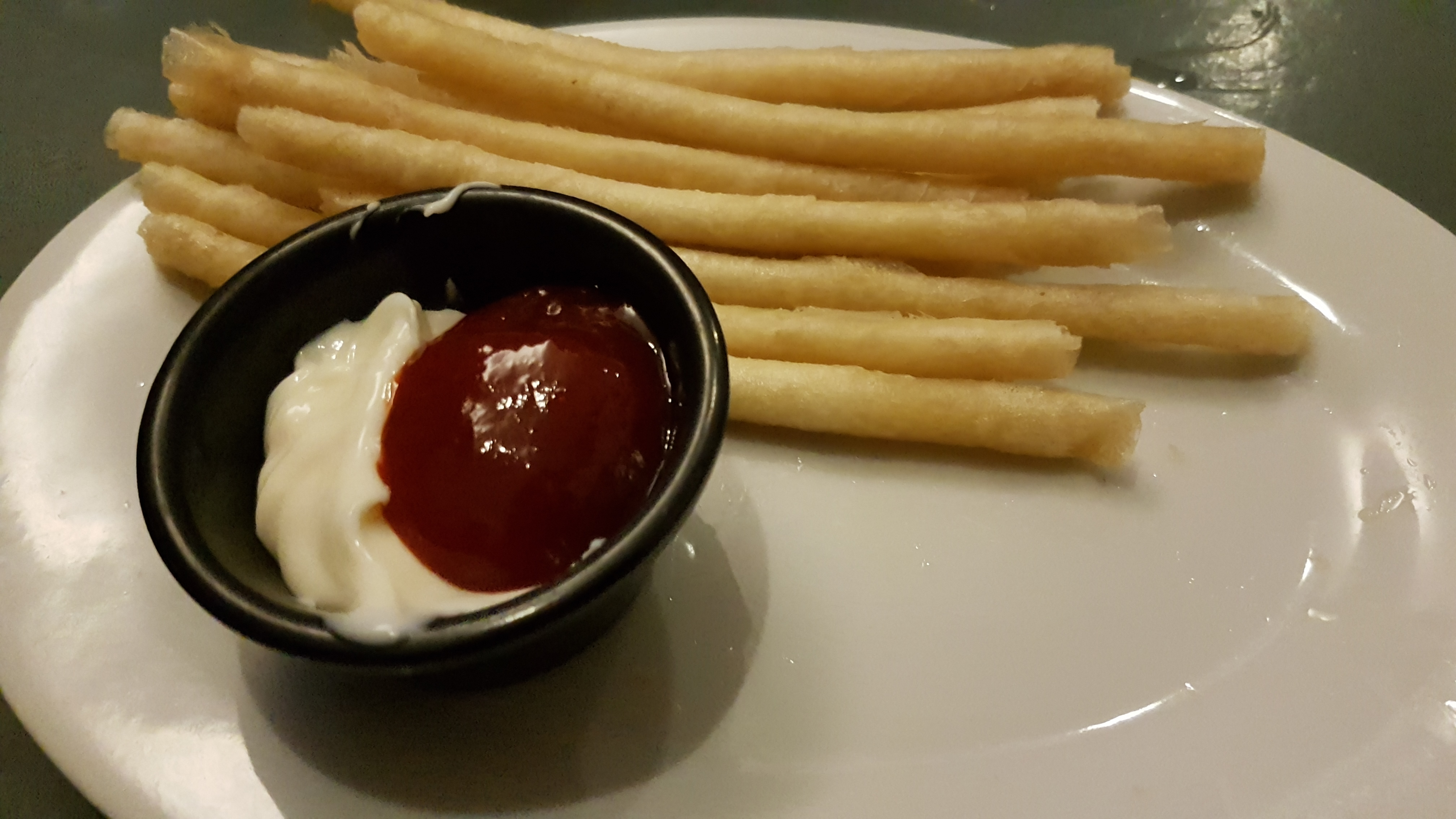
Lumpiang keso, serve with ketchup and mayonnaise

A variant of Filipino Lumpia, Filling is purely any type of melted cheese wrapped in Lumpia wrapper and fried. This dish is eaten with condiments like ketchup and any sweet-sour sauces, similar to American Mozzarella Stick. These dishes are highly customizable with some use differents variation of cheese or even add processed meat product like bacon and ham as additional ingredients.

=== Pisang cokelat ===
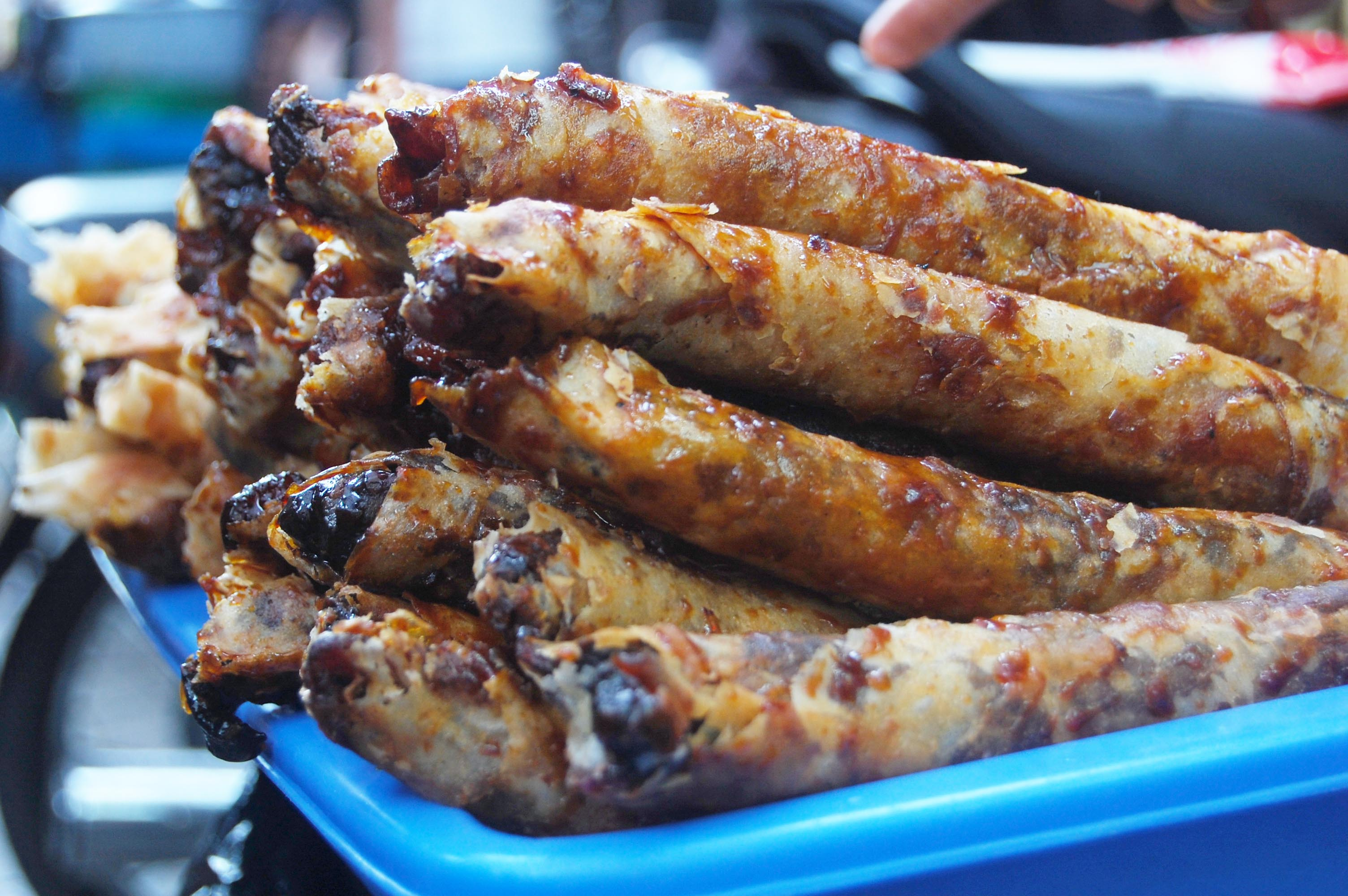

An Indonesian snack, mostly identical to the traditional Turon, but also includes Chocolates as a mandatory filling of the roll.
