= Bicol express =

Filipino stew with chili peppers

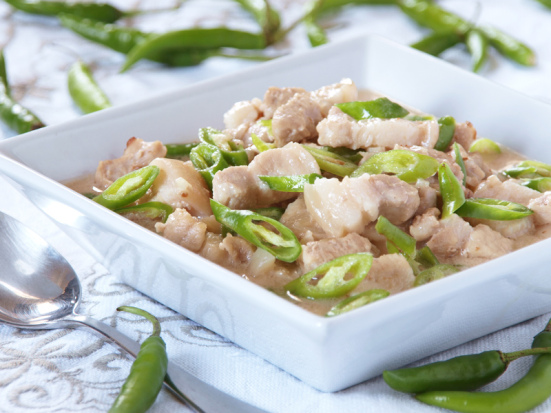
- Alternative names: Sinilihan
- Type: Stew
- Course: Main
- Place of origin: Philippines
- Region or state: Bicol Region
- Main ingredients: Long chilies, coconut milk, shrimp paste or stockfish, onion, pork, garlic, ginger
- Variations: Inulukan, ginataang isda, laing, pinakbet, gulay na may lada, pinangat, dinamita, gising-gising

Bicol express, known natively in Bikol as sinilihan (lit. ''spiced with chili''), is a common Filipino dish which was popularized in the district of Malate, Manila, but made in traditional Bicolano style. It is a stew made from long chili peppers (siling haba in Tagalog) or small chili peppers (siling labuyo in Tagalog), coconut milk or coconut cream (kakang gata in Tagalog), shrimp paste (bagoong alamang in Tagalog) or stockfish, onion, pork, ginger and garlic. The dish was named by Laguna resident Cely Kalaw during a cooking competition in the 1970s in Malate, Manila. The name was inspired by the Bicol Express railway train (Philippine National Railways) that operated from Tutuban, Manila to Legazpi, Albay, the regional center of the Bicol region.

The widely-known name for this dish in the Bicol Region of the Philippines was identified as gulay na may lada, which is currently one of the vegetarian variants of the Bicol express dish. As time progressed, variants of the Bicol express dish expanded with seafood, beef, pescetarian, vegetarian, vegan, and other versions. The preparations for these dishes vary according to the meat present within the dish.

In terms of nutritional value, the original version of the Bicol express dish is beneficial in protein but unhealthy in regards to its high levels of saturated fats and cholesterol. The dish has moved into food processing and commercial production so that it can be sold conveniently and stored for a longer period of time.

== History ==
=== Origins ===
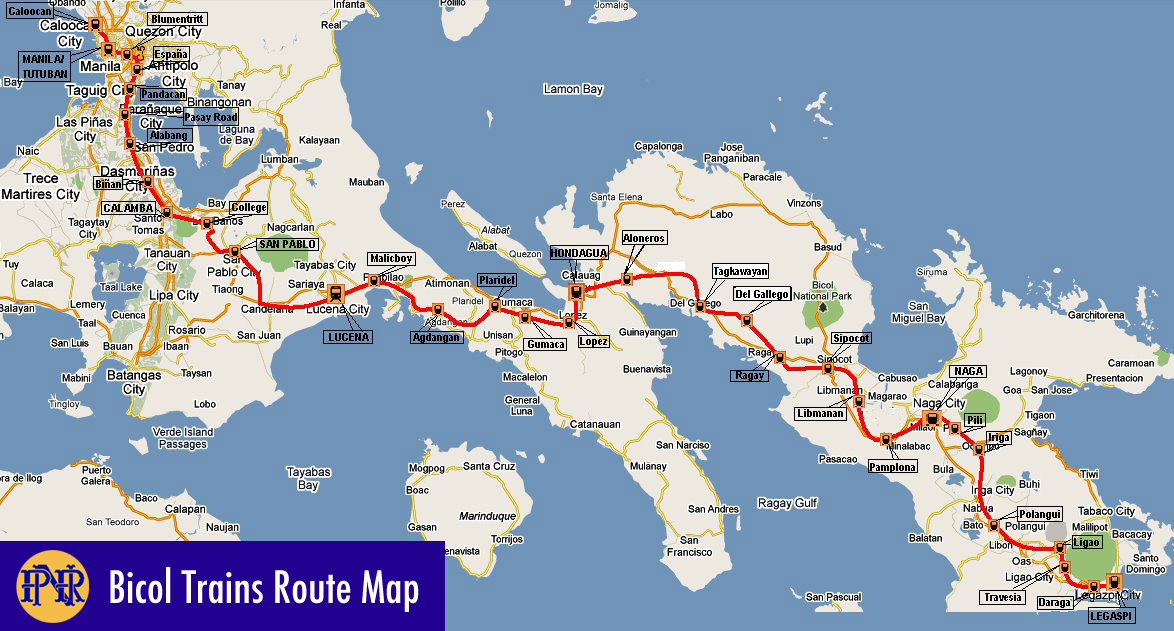
Route map of Bicol Express.

The Bicol express dish had been formally named by a Laguna native, Cely Kalaw, as a result of her cooking competition experience in the 1970s at Malate, Manila. She created this new dish derived from rendang that existed in the Philippines since the Sulu Sultanate era in response to her customers' high interest for a spicy and sizzling taro dish. While trying to determine a name for the dish, Kalaw's brother heard the sound of Philippine National Railways trains traveling by Kalaw's restaurant to Manila. This event inspired Kalaw to name the dish Bicol express after the PNR train that is programmed to undergo the Manila-Legazpi route.

Prior to Kalaw's formal terminology of the Bicol express dish, a similar Ilocano meal was recognised as gulay na may lada in the Bicol region. Gulay na may lada is a vegetarian variant of the dish that consists of exactly the same ingredients as the Bicol express dish, except it lacks the meat components of the meal (pork chunks and shrimp paste). There is a Bicolano influence in the creation of the Bicol express as Kalaw's upbringing is situated in the regions of Bicol. This upbringing provided her with the knowledge about creating Bicolano cuisine.

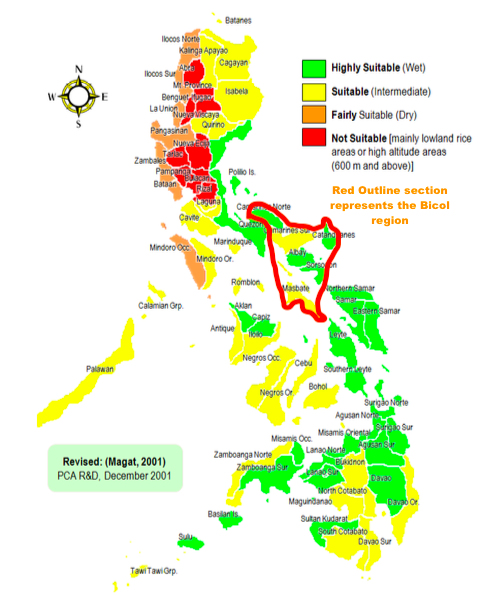
A map of the Philippines that details coconut growing zones.

During the 1960s, the Bicol express dish was created and sold by people in the Bicol Region despite a lack of name for the dish. Bicolanos would wait at the Sipocot station, Camarines Sur, for a train to make a temporary stop and they would start selling the dish to the passengers. The dish was stored in a plastic bag and the rice was wrapped in a bundle of taro leaves. The dish's convenient setup allowed it to be easily sold and spread across the region of Bicol. However, food selling on trains became prohibited on the PNR train lines and so the dish's relevance diminished over time until Kalaw was able to reintroduce and popularise the dish in her restaurant in Malate, Manila.

=== Culture and environment ===
The ingredients of coconut and chili peppers are predominant in dishes originating from the Bicol community. Both of these ingredients are endemic across the provinces of Bicol. There are over 50 million coconut-bearing trees in Bicol. The region also meets the criteria for highly suitable wet conditions for coconut-growing zones.

Siling labuyo (small chili pepper) is commonly used in many Bicolano dishes. Under the Scoville scale, the siling labuyo is 100,000 Scoville Heat Units (SHU) and siling haba is 50,000 SHU, but this can vary depending on the conditions of the peppers' growing environments. The siling labuyo in Bicol is much spicier than the siling labuyo in Manila, which makes it one of the spiciest chili peppers in the Philippines. The siling labuyo peppers were introduced by Spanish settlers during their exploration of the New World.

== Preparation ==
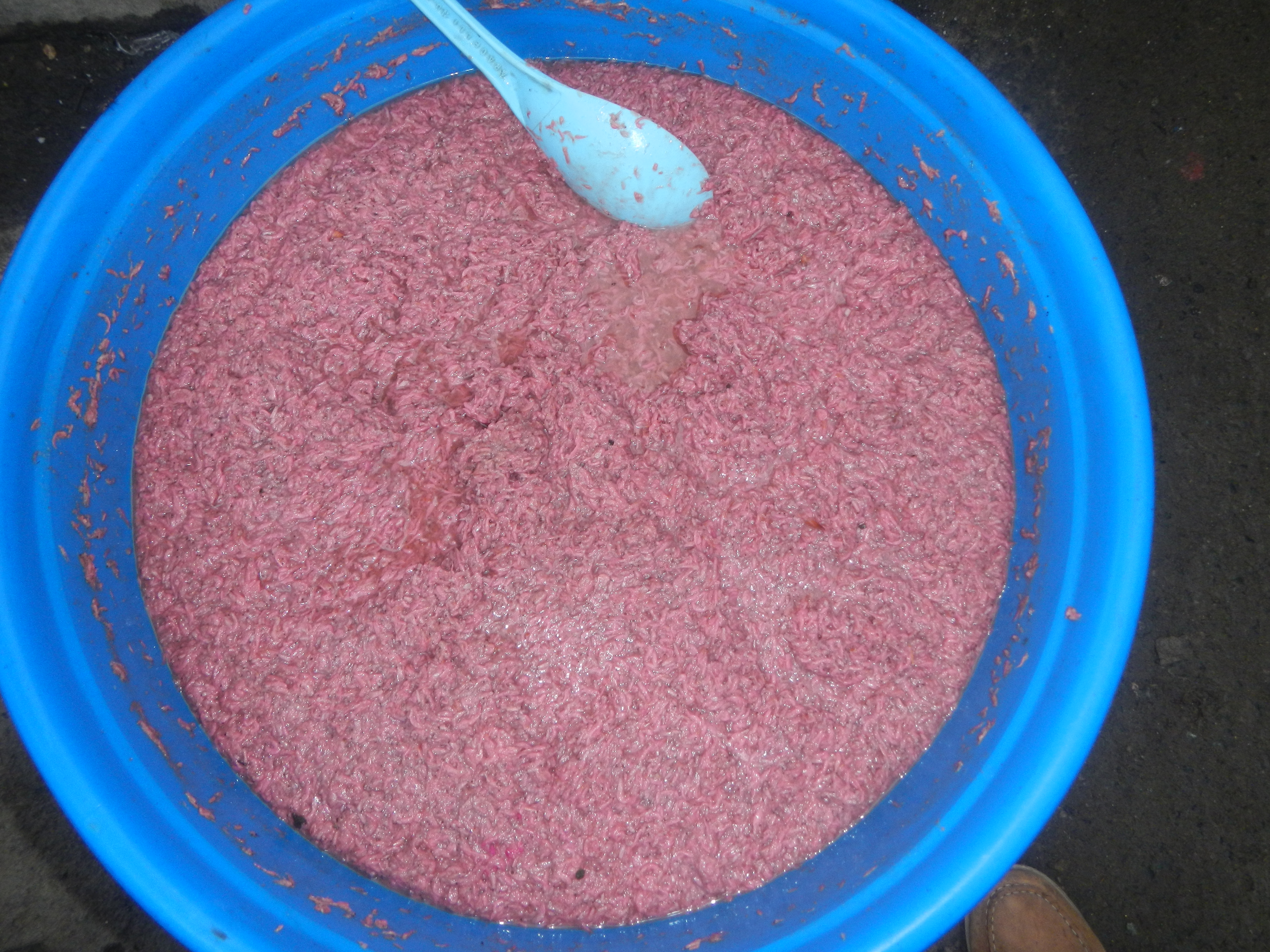
Fresh bagoong alamang caught through cast netting. This will be used for the base sauce of Bicol express.

The ingredients for the main preparation of making the original Bicol express dish are oil, ginger, garlic, onion, pork chunks, coconut cream/milk, siling haba (long chili peppers), bagoong alamang (shrimp paste) and a side of rice.

The first step to creating this dish is to pour oil into the pan at a medium level of heat. All of the garlic, onion and ginger needs to be diced up into sizes of 1-cm cubes. The use of garlic and onion in Filipino cuisine have been influenced by the Spaniards who sautéed these ingredients to enrich the flavors of their meals. These three ingredients are then placed into the pan and cooked for three minutes. Next, the pork chunks are added into the pan and cooked until it darkens to brown. The pork is the main ingredient that establishes the basis of the Bicol express dish and differentiates it from other variations. After the pork has turned brown, the coconut cream/milk is poured into the pan and simmered for a couple minutes under low levels of heat. Next, after 30 minutes of saturating the siling haba under salted water, drain the water and cut up the siling haba into 1-inch slices and add into the pan.

Siling haba is used instead of siling labuyo, as the SHU levels of the siling haba is only 50,000 SHU, which will allow the spiciness to be more manageable for the customers. However, siling labuyo is still used in creating the Bicol express within the Bicol Peninsula as the natives are more accustomed to the spiciness. The last ingredient added into the pan is the bagoong alamang (shrimp paste). Bicolano residents retrieve alamang (shrimp) naturally through cast netting and then ferment the shrimp to create bagoong alamang. Despite the traditional use of bagoong for seasoning purposes in other Filipino cuisines, freshly fermented bagoong alamang enhances the flavors of the Bicol express by being the "base of the sauce for the dish". The Bicol express dish is served hot with a bowl of rice on the side. Rice is fundamental in the diet of Filipino cuisines and the Bicol express dish would be incomplete without this important ingredient.

== Variations ==
=== Seafood ===
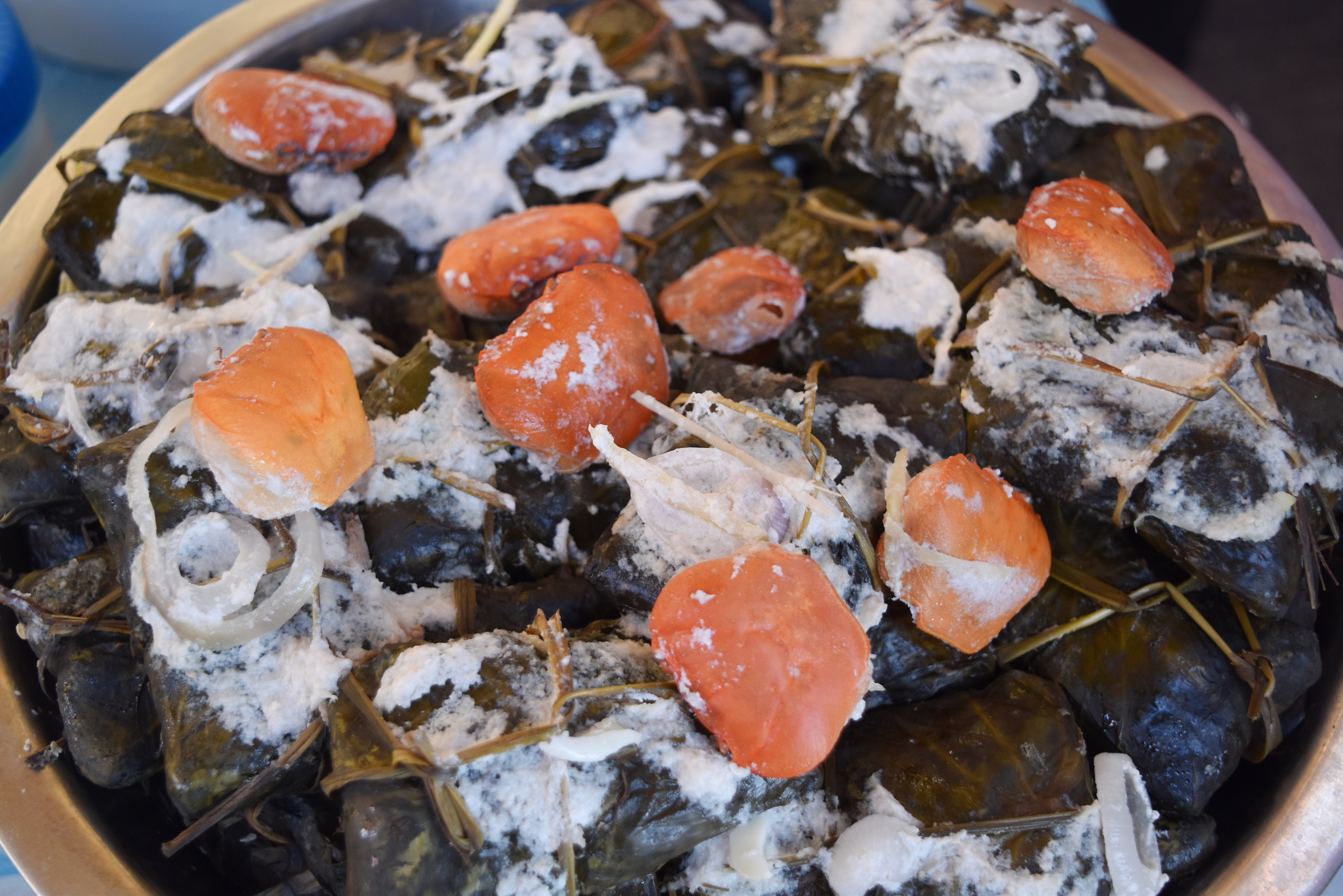
Inulukan, a variant that uses river crabs wrapped in whole taro leaves and cooked in coconut milk

There are numerous seafood variations of the Bicol express dish. The meat of the dish can be replaced with fish (tilapia), crab, manta rays, shark, shrimp, etc, to alter the taste and texture of the dish. All of these dishes continue to be served with a hot bowl of rice.

Ginataang Tilapia or Ginataang Isda is one of these variations. The tilapia is boiled under the katang gata (coconut cream) and vinegar, and mixed with siling labuyo, onion and garlic. The dish differentiates from the Bicol express Tilapia as there is vinegar added into the Ginataang to provide it a more sour flavour.

A more unique example is the Kinunot na Pating, or Kinunot for short. This dish is similar to the Bicol express meal except that the pork chunks are replaced with pieces of shark bits or manta ray meat. This changes the texture of the meal and gives the person eating the dish a more exotic experience.

Inulukan is another variant of the Bicol express dish (See Inulukan for more) that uses river crabs as the meat basis of the delicacy instead of pork chunks. All of the ingredients are then stored into a taro leave bundle and then simmered under the kakanggata (coconut cream).

=== Beef ===
Beef is another meat replacement that can be cooked with in the creation of a Bicol express meal. The dish uses the same preparation process as the original Bicol express method. However, the beef is not as tender as the pork chunks, though it can be prepared and cooked faster in the pan than the pork.

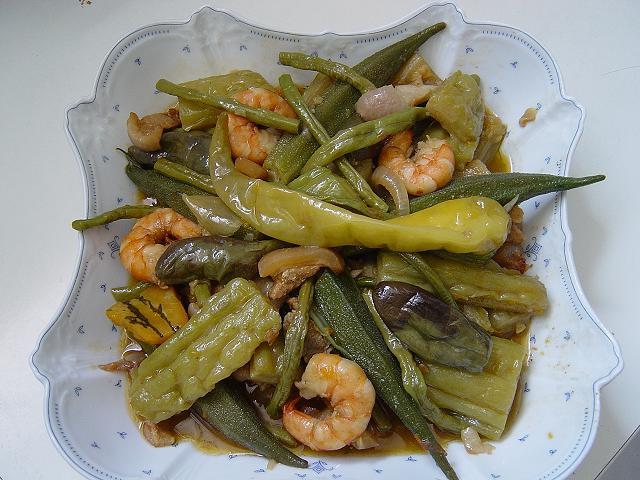
Pinakbet, a pescatarian version that replaces pork with vegetables such as bok choy and sweet potato shoots.

=== Pescatarian ===
Pinakbet is a pescatarian alternative for the Bicol express dish. This dish originates from the Ilocano community, and they use vegetables to replace the pork chunk component of the meal. These vegetables are bok choy (pechay in Tagalog) and the shoots of sweet potatoes (camote tops in Filipino lingo). The seafood component of this dish is the incorporation of alamang (shrimp) into the sauce to elevate the flavors of the meal.

=== Vegetarian ===
Gulay na may lada is the oldest known vegetarian variant of the Bicol express dish that is created using the traditional-ways of cooking within the Bicol Peninsula.

=== Vegan ===
The Bicol Express dish have been transformed into a vegan form using various ingredient replacements. The pork is substituted with tofu and shiitake mushrooms are added to restore the texture of the dish. Vegetable paste and gluten-free soy sauce are used to replace the bagoong alamang that bases the rich flavors of the dish's broth.

=== Others ===
Another type of Bicol express variants is one of Bicol's other signature dishes, Pinangat (or Laing) which is exactly the same as the Bicol express's original recipe, except it does not contain onions. All the ingredients of the Pinangat dish is then wrapped with taro leaves and cooked under katang gata (coconut cream).

== Nutrition ==
The nutritional value of the Bicol express dish observes a range of benefits and a couple of poor effects on the body. The negative impacts of this dish is its high levels of saturated fats and cholesterol that makes it an incompatible diet for weight loss. The siling labuyo used in the Bicol express provides the dish with its rich levels of vitamin C, iron and magnesium. In Filipino practices, siling labuyo have been utilized as a form of traditional home remedy for treating tooth pains. The Bicol express dish is also a rich source for protein and it will have plenty of health benefits for the body. The dish estimates around having 308 calories per 246 grams of serving, which approximately fifty percent of the calories come from the fats.

== Processing and production ==
Unlike the historical versions of selling Bicol express in plastic bags and rice in taro leaves, advanced technologies have allowed the dish to be stocked in a more convenient set-up. In 2012, the food processing of Bicol express into glass jars was considered by the Llaguno family. The Philippines' Department of Science and Technology aided in extending the shelf life of these processed dishes for another year and the commercial production of processed Bicol express meals began to proliferate.

== See also ==
- Dinamita
- Gising-gising
- Laing
- Rendang
- List of stews
