= Laing (food) =

Filipino dish

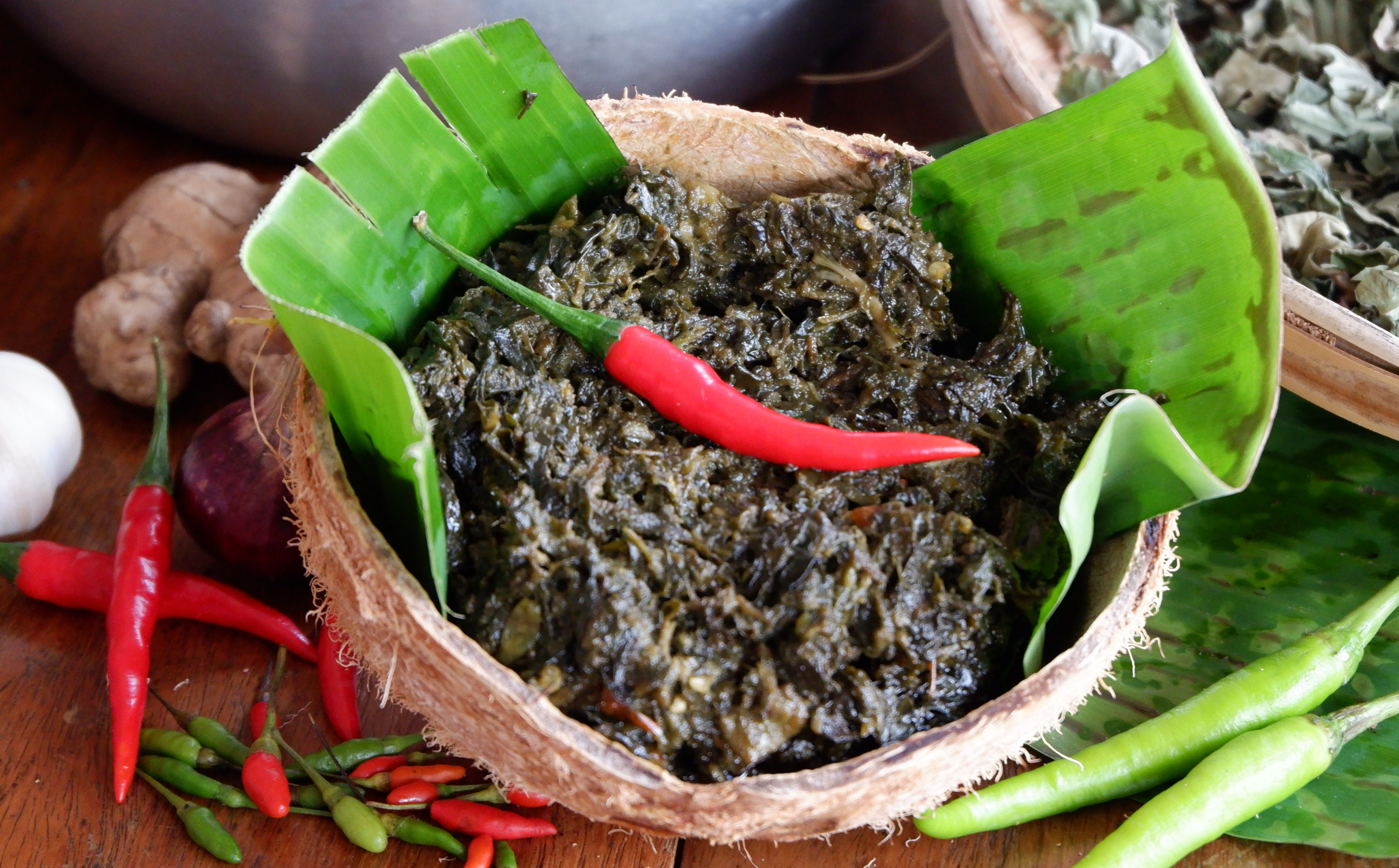
- Alternative names: pinangat, laing pinangat, pinangat na laing, pinangat na gabi, ginataang laing
- Type: Stew
- Place of origin: Philippines
- Region or state: Bicol Region
- Created by: Filipino cuisine
- Main ingredients: Taro leaves, chili, meat or seafood, coconut milk
- Variations: inulukan, tinumok, linapay
- Similar dishes: sinanglay, Bicol express, gising-gising, callaloo

Laing (pronounced [ˈlaʔɪŋ] LAH-ing), is a Filipino dish of shredded or whole taro leaves with meat or seafood cooked in thick coconut milk spiced with labuyo chili, lemongrass, garlic, shallots, ginger, and shrimp paste. It originates from the Bicol Region, where it is known simply as pinangat. Laing is also a type of ginataan (Filipino dishes cooked in coconut milk), and thus may also be referred to as ginataang laing. Laing is commonly eaten as a vegetable side to complement meat or fish side dishes known as ulam in Filipino, which is normally paired with boiled white rice.

== Names ==
Laing, meaning "dried or withered [leaves]" in Tagalog, is the name of the dish in most parts of the Philippines. However, in the Bicol region, where it originates from, it is simply called pinangat. This name can be confused with pinangat na isda, which is a different dish made with fish cooked in a slightly sour broth similar to sinigang. The confusion stems from the original meaning of the verb pangat in the languages of Southern Luzon, which simply means to cook fish or meat in a broth of water and salt.

Laing is typical of Bicolano cuisine, which is known for their common use of chilis and coconut milk. Laing is also known as ginataang laing, pinangat na laing, pinangat na gabi and ginat-ang gabi, among other names.

== Description ==
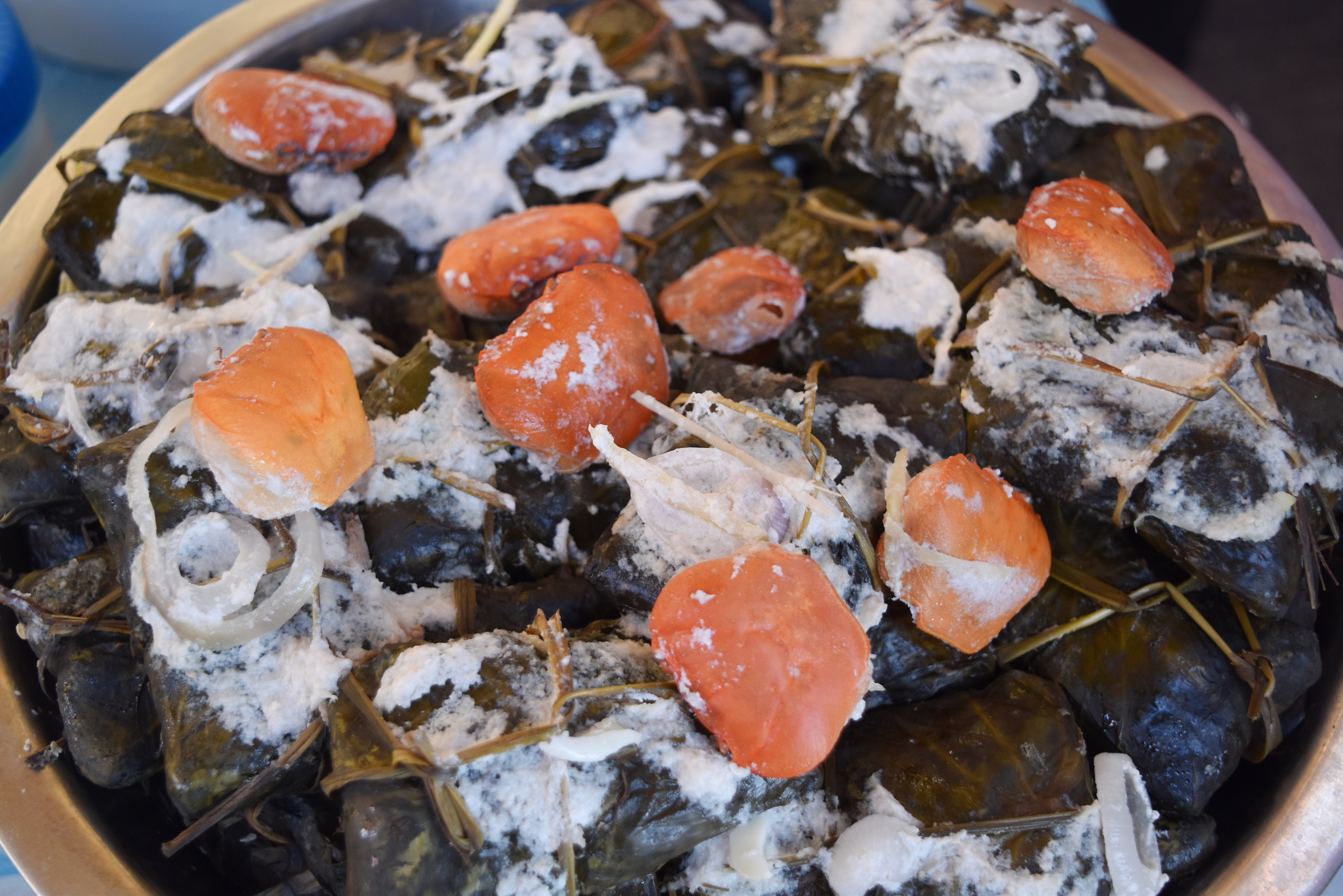
Inulukan, a variant that uses river crabs wrapped in whole taro leaves and cooked in coconut milk

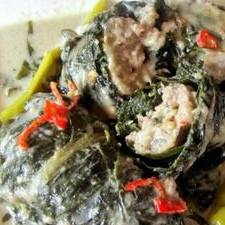
Tinumok, a variant of laing that uses a mixture of shrimp and fish flakes with grated coconut

The original laing from the Bicol Region does not use shredded taro leaves, but rather a whole fresh taro leaf (natong in Bicolano). This version is the one most commonly referred to as pinangat. The mixture usually consists of cubed pre-cooked pork, shrimp, or fish flakes (or all three) with bagoong alamang (shrimp paste), crushed labuyo chili, garlic, shallots, ginger, and kakang gata (coconut cream). It is wrapped with the leaf and tied with a coconut leaf midrib or twine. It is then steamed in gata (coconut milk) with a knot of tanglad (lemongrass) until the leaf pouches are fork-tender and the coconut milk is reduced to a thick sauce.

The laing version served in Manila and elsewhere is cooked similarly, but with the leaves shredded (usually sold dried, hence the name). It also usually includes chopped leaf stalks. Laing is usually eaten with white rice, but it can also be eaten sandwiched in bread like pandesal or used as a stuffing for other dishes. It is also commonly eaten as a side dish to meat.

The taro leaves to be used for laing must be prepared correctly, as they contain amounts of calcium oxalate crystals (raphides) that can sometimes cause itching and burning sensations in the mouth. They are usually washed and cooked thoroughly to avoid this. Drying can also lessen the amount of crystals.

== Variants ==
Notable variants of laing include:

=== Inulukan ===
Inulukan or inulokan is a variant of laing made from the meat of river crabs (uluk or ulok) wrapped in whole taro leaves and cooked in coconut milk spiced with calamansi, black pepper, and lemongrass. It is a specialty of Camalig, Albay. It is also known as pinangat na ugama or pinangat na talangka, from ugama and talangka, other local terms for river crabs.

=== Linapay ===
Linapay also known as tinamuk, is a related dish from Aklan in the Western Visayas. It is made from pounded freshwater shrimp (ueang) mixed with gawud (grated young coconut meat) and wrapped with taro leaves (gutaw) and cooked in coconut milk.

=== Tinumok ===
Tinumok, tinomok, or tinulmok is another traditional variant from Bicol which uses whole taro leaves wrapped around a mixture of freshwater shrimp, fish flakes (and sometimes meat), and shrimp paste, with minced or grated coconut meat, onions, chilis, lemongrass, garlic, and other spices cooked in coconut milk. It differs primarily in its use of coconut meat.

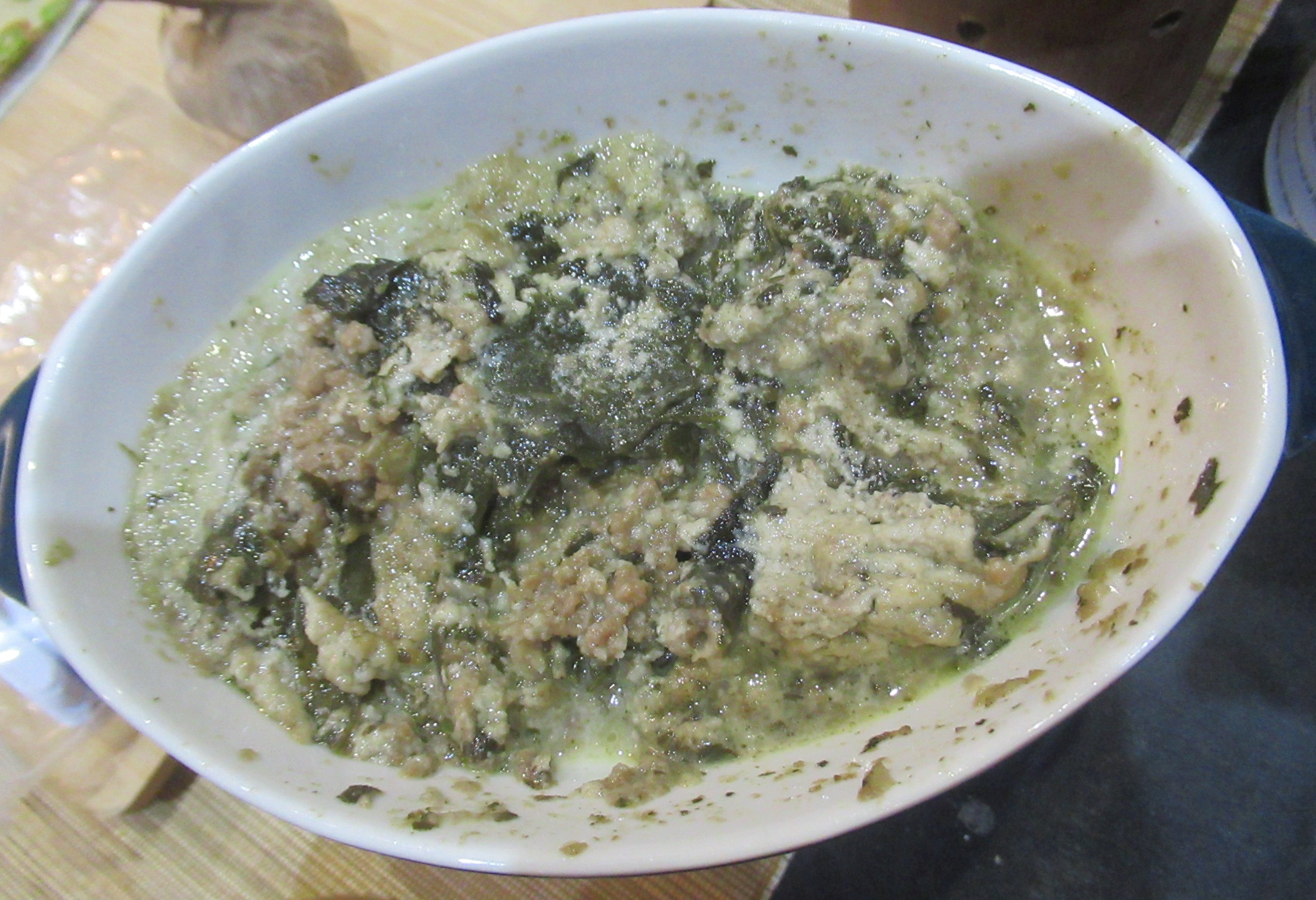
Vegan pinangat

==== Vegan pinangat ====
Bicol's vegan pinangat is a laing variant (pinangat na laing, a Bicol dish).

=== Pangat ===
Laing is sometimes referred to as pangat in Ilonggo-speaking regions. Often a souring agent such as batuan, kamias, or vinegar is added.

=== Dagmay ===
In the Province of Antique, a variant is called ginat-an nga dagmay, and uses taro (Karay-a, Hiligaynon: dagmay; Tagalog: gabi) leaves but also its runners or shoots (Hiligaynon: takway), pigeon peas (Karay-a, Hiligaynon, Tagalog: kadyos), river snails, in particular, telescope snails (Karaya-a, Hiligaynon, Tagalog: bagongon; Scientific name: Telescopium telescopium). The same dish is called ginata-ang bagongon kag dagmay in the Province of Iloilo.

In the Province of Iloilo, a variant is called ginat-an nga igi, dagmay kag takway, and uses taro runners or shoots, and freshwater snails, in particular, golden apple snails (Hiligaynon: igi; Tagalog: kuhol; Scientific name: Pomacea canaliculata).

In the Eastern Visayas and especially among the Waray people, a variant is called hinatukan nga dagmay or hinatukan nga gaway, but snails may or may not be used, and other meats may be used, or no meat is used at all. Gaway is tarot and hinatukan refers to dishes stewed in thick coconut milk or cream in the Waray language.

== See also ==
- Sarsa na uyang
- Ginataan
- Binalot
- Piaparan
- Paksiw
- Cuisine of the Philippines
- Buntil
- Pepes
- Callaloo, a similar native dish from the Caribbean
- Lūʻau (food), similar native dishes from Polynesia
