= Psophocarpus =

Scientific classification
- Kingdom: Plantae
- Clade: Tracheophytes
- Clade: Angiosperms
- Clade: Eudicots
- Clade: Rosids
- Order: Fabales
- Family: Fabaceae
- Subfamily: Faboideae
- Tribe: Phaseoleae
- Genus: Psophocarpus; Neck. ex DC.

Species
- see text

Synonyms
- Botor Adans.; Diesingia Endl.; Vignopsis De Wild.

Genus of legumes

Psophocarpus is a genus of flowering plants in the legume family, Fabaceae. It includes nine species of climbing herbs or subshrubs native to tropical Africa. Typical habitats include seasonally-dry tropical forest and forest margins, moist wooded grassland and grassland, thicket, swamp, and secondary vegetation. It belongs to subfamily Faboideae.

== Species ==
There are currently 10 living species of Psophocarpus:

Subgenus Psophocarpus

Sect. Psocarpus

- P. grandiflorus R.Wilczek – umuharakuku
- P. obovalis Tisser.
- P. palustris Desv.
- P. scandens (Endl.)Verdc. – anonantaka
- P. tetragonolobus (L.) DC. – asparagus bean, princess bean, four-angled bean, winged bean

Sect. Unifoliate

- P. lecomtei Tisser.
- P. monophyllus Harms

Subgenus Vignopsis

- P. indicus Wild. – goa bean, winged bean (Note: Not included in Fatihah et al.)
- P. lancifolius Harms
- P. lukafuensis (De Wild.)R.Wilczek
