= Gising-gising =

Spicy Filipino vegetable soup or stew

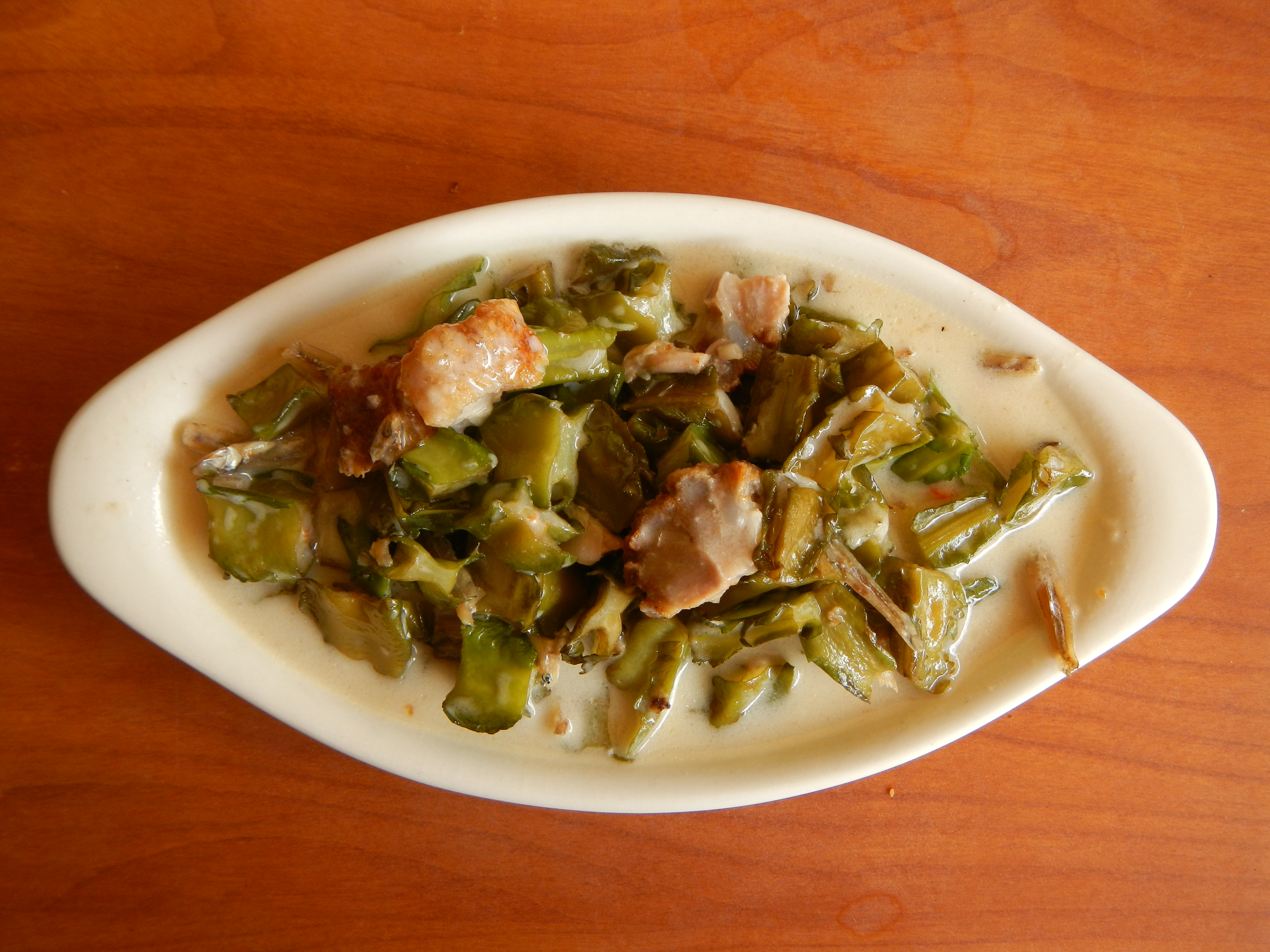
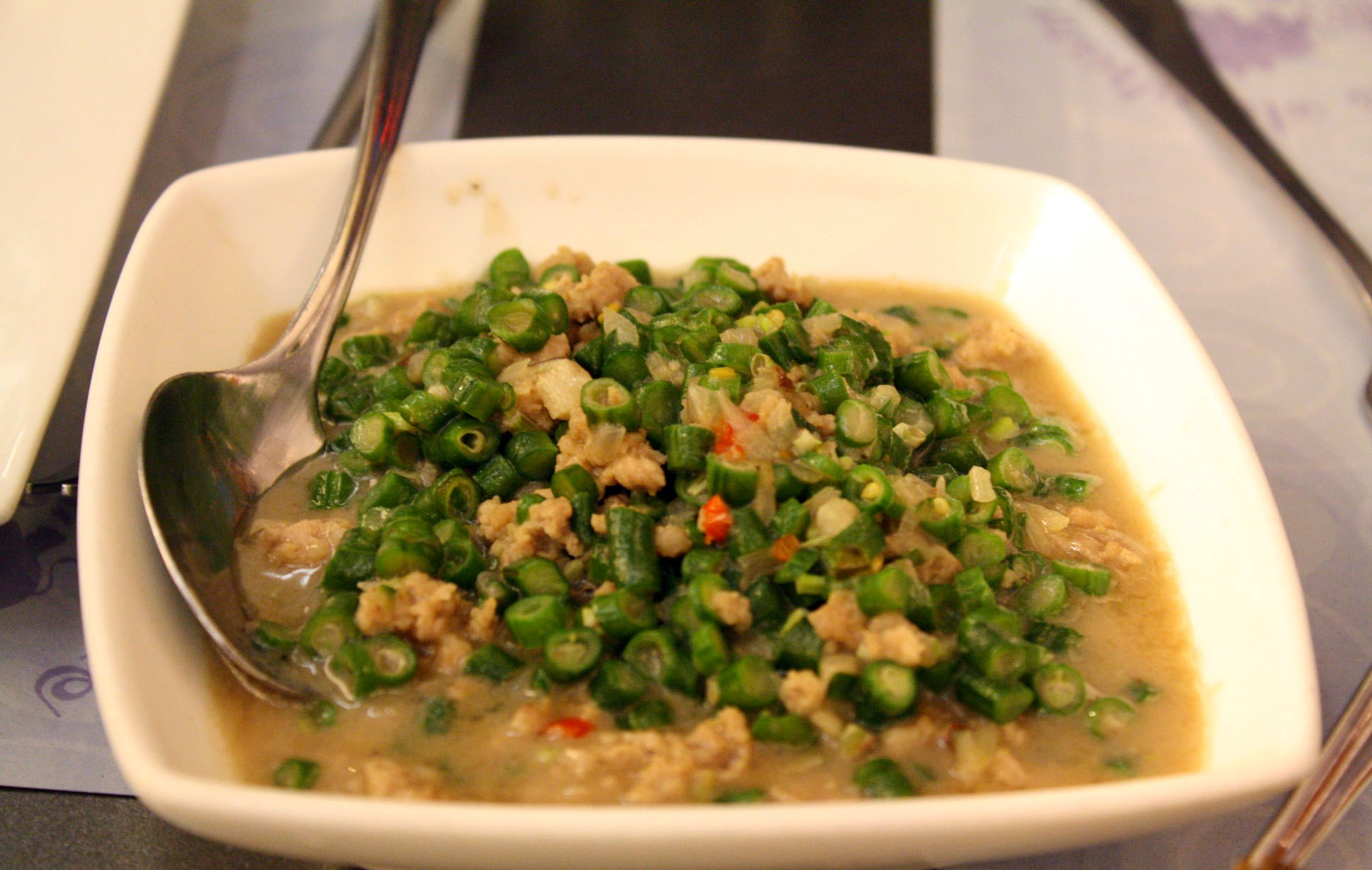
- Top: Gising-gising with pork; Bottom:Gising-gising from Cebu with yardlong beans
- Alternative names: Ginataang sigarilyas; Ginataang carabansos
- Course: Main course
- Place of origin: Philippines
- Region or state: Nueva Ecija, Pampanga
- Serving temperature: Hot
- Main ingredients: winged beans, shrimp paste, labuyo chili, coconut milk, garlic, onions, ground meat or seafood

Gising-gising, also known as ginataang sigarilyas, is a spicy Filipino vegetable stew or soup. It originates from the provinces of Nueva Ecija and Pampanga. The dish is traditionally made with chopped winged beans (sigarillas or sigarilyas), coconut milk, labuyo chilis, garlic, onions, and shrimp paste (bagoong alamang). The name literally means "wake up, wake up". Gising-gising can be eaten on its own, served over rice, or used as a side dish for grilled meat dishes. Gising‑gising is part of the broader category of Filipino dishes known as ginataan, which are cooked with coconut milk. It is known for its balance of creaminess, heat, and savory depth.

== Description ==
The basic ingredient of gising-gising is winged beans chopped finely or into diagonal 1 to 2 in (2.5 to 5.1 cm) strips. They are cooked in coconut milk with garlic, ginger, onions, bagoong alamang (shrimp paste), and siling haba and labuyo peppers. The dish also commonly includes ground meat (usually pork), ground shrimp, or shredded tinapa (smoked fish).

== Variations ==
Winged beans can also be substituted with chopped yardlong beans or water spinach (kangkong). The dish can also be cooked with other seafood like squid and can include other vegetables and spices. The shrimp paste can also be replaced with commercial bouillon cubes or meat or seafood stock.

A variant of the dish using calabaza is ginataang sigarilyas at kalabasa which can also be treated as a variant of ginataang kalabasa.

== Similar dishes ==
Gising-gising is very similar to the Bicolano dish Bicol express in terms of ingredients, to the point that spicier versions of gising-gising are sometimes referred to as "Sigarilyas Express".

== See also ==
- Bicol express
- Laing (food)
- Ginataang ampalaya
