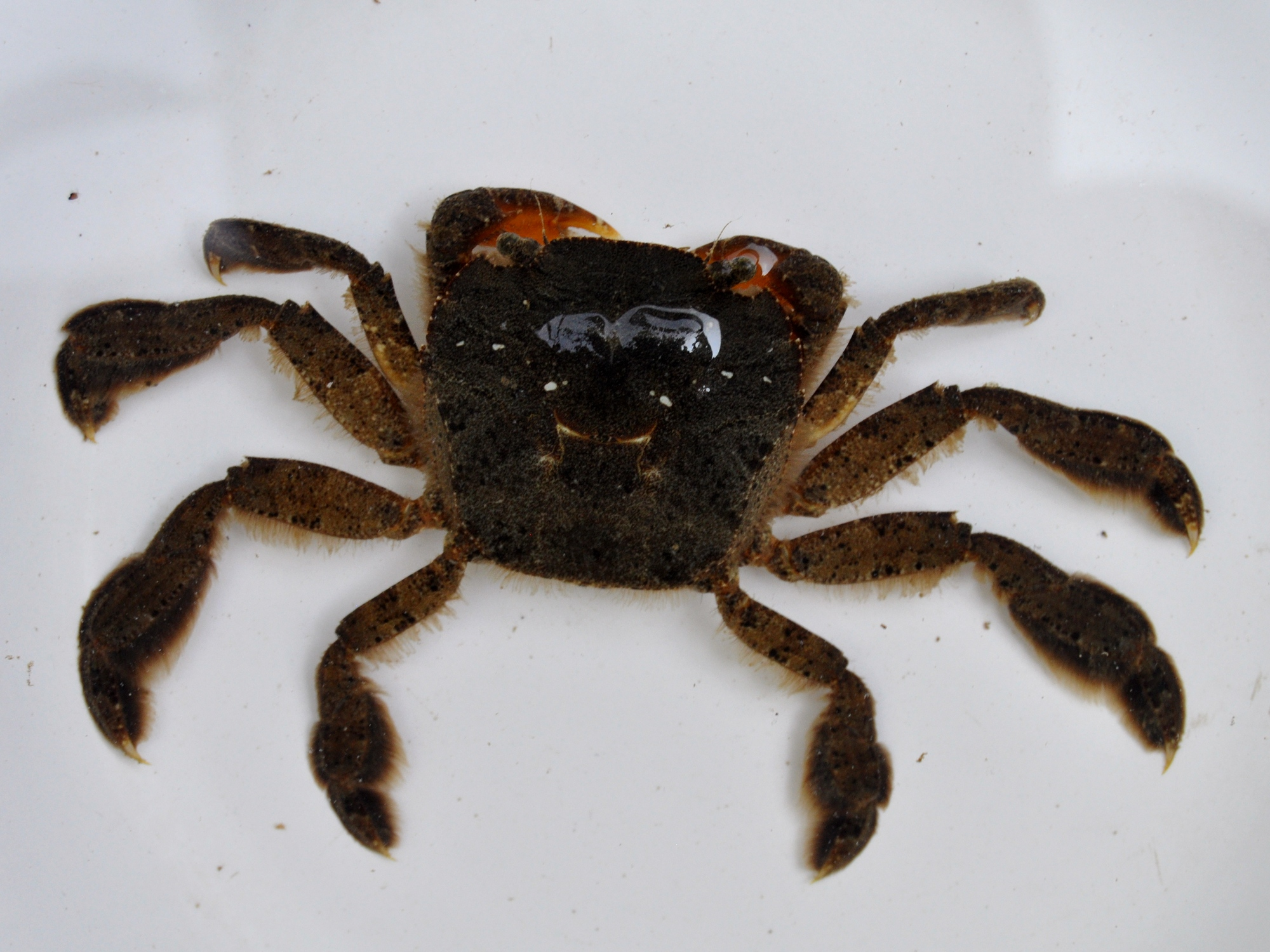

Scientific classification
- Kingdom: Animalia
- Phylum: Arthropoda
- Clade: Pancrustacea
- Class: Malacostraca
- Order: Decapoda
- Suborder: Pleocyemata
- Infraorder: Brachyura
- Family: Varunidae
- Genus: Varuna
- Species: V. litterata

Binomial name
- Varuna litterata Fabricius (1798)

= Varuna litterata =

River swimming crab

Species of crab

Varuna litterata, also known as the river swimming crab or the peregrine crab, is a euryhaline species of crab native to the Indo-Pacific. It is commonly found in slow-moving or almost stagnant fresh or brackish waters in estuarine habitats.
