= Hot and sour soup =

Chinese soup with sour and spicy ingredients

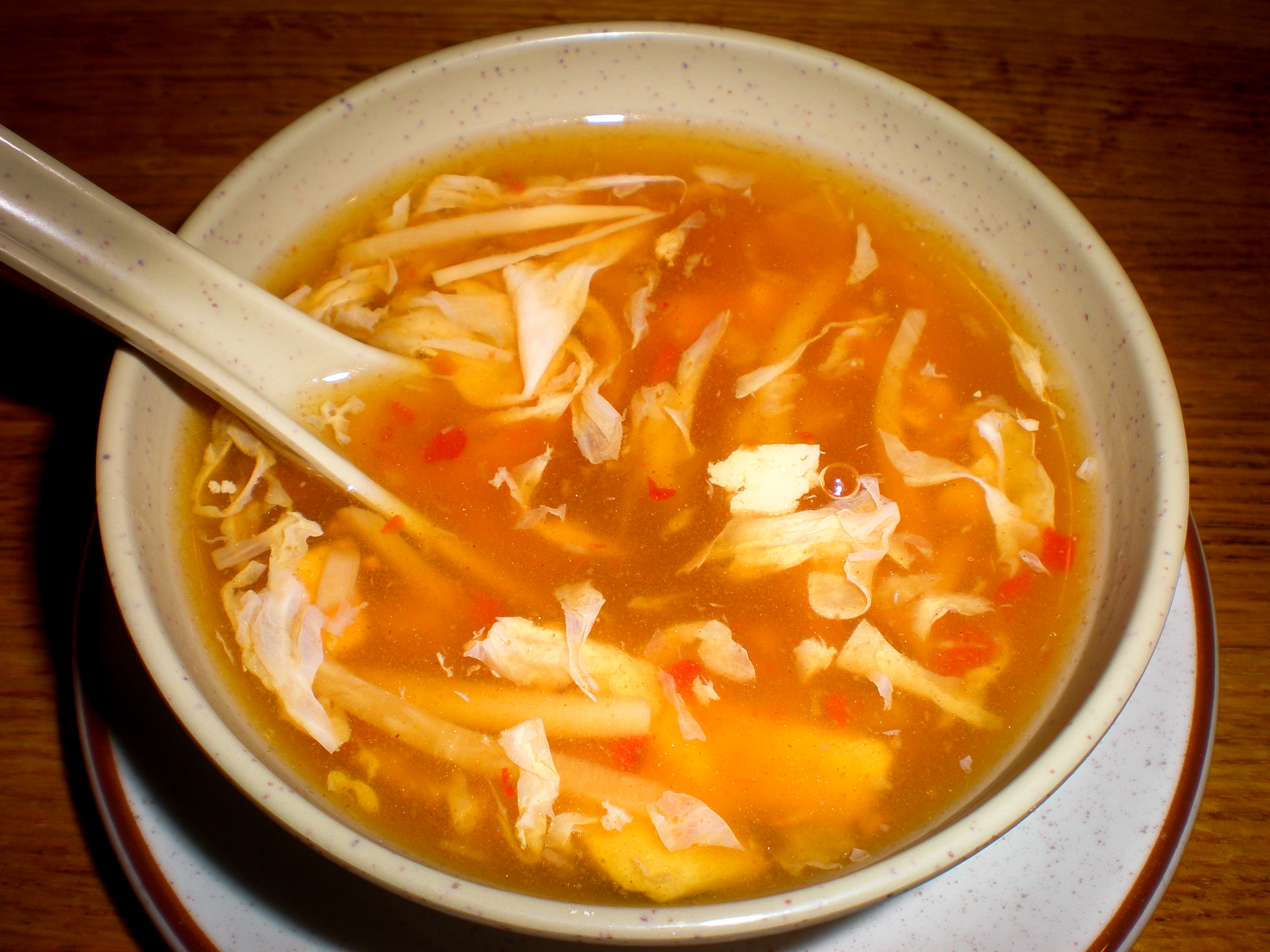
- Type: Soup
- Place of origin: China
- Region or state: Henan

Hot and sour soup
- Traditional Chinese: 酸辣湯
- Simplified Chinese: 酸辣汤
- Literal meaning: "Sour and hot soup"
Transcriptions
Standard Mandarin
- Hanyu Pinyin: suānlà tāng
- Wade–Giles: suan^{1}-la^{4} t'ang^{1}
- IPA: [swánlâ tʰáŋ]
Yue: Cantonese
- Yale Romanization: syūn-laaht tōng
- Jyutping: syun1-laat6 tong1
- IPA: [syn˥ lat̚˨ tʰɔŋ˥]
Southern Min
- Tâi-lô: sng-lua̍h thng

Hot and sour soup is a variant of hulatang or "pepper hot soup" (Chinese: 胡辣汤) that originated from Henan cuisine. Also popular in Southeast Asia, India, Pakistan, and the United States, it is a flexible soup which allows ingredients to be substituted or added depending on availability. For example, the American-Chinese version can be thicker as it commonly includes corn starch, while in Japan, sake is often added.

== North America ==
=== United States ===
Soup preparation may use chicken or pork broth, or may use meat-free broth. Common basic ingredients in the American Chinese version include bamboo shoots, toasted sesame oil, wood ear mushrooms, cloud ear mushrooms, day lily buds, vinegar, egg, corn starch, and white pepper. Other ingredients include button mushrooms, shiitake mushrooms, or straw mushrooms and small slices of tofu skin. It is thicker than the Chinese cuisine versions due to the addition of cornstarch.

== East Asia ==
=== China ===
There are myths surrounding the origin of "hot and sour soup," with the most popular one claiming it is from Sichuan. There is a similarly named dish made from glass noodles called "hot and sour noodles" (Chinese: 酸辣粉), but it is quite different from "hot and sour soup"(Chinese: 酸辣汤). It is vastly different in ingredients, cooking and consuming. For instance, the spiciness in this noodle dish mainly comes from chilli and Sichuan pepper, rather than black pepper, which is not very common in Sichuan cuisine. In fact, the form of "hot and sour soup" can barely be found in Sichuan.

"Hot and sour soup" is claimed by the cuisine of Beijing. The Chinese hot and sour soup is usually meat-based, and often contains ingredients such as day lily buds, wood ear fungus, bamboo shoots, and tofu, in a broth that is sometimes flavored with pork blood. Sometimes, the soup would also have carrots and pieces of pork. It is typically made hot (spicy) by white pepper, and sour by Zhenjiang vinegar.

=== Japan ===
Japanese hot and sour soup is made with the traditional dashi broth flavored with vinegar, soy sauce and sake, and may include shiitake mushrooms, tofu, bamboo shoots and red chilis. The soup is thickened with eggs and potato starch.

== South Asia ==
=== India ===
In India, this soup is made with red and green chillies, ginger, carrots, snow peas, tofu, soy sauce, rice vinegar and a pinch of sugar. It is viewed in India as being a Chinese soup.

=== Pakistan ===
Hot and sour soup is usually made in Pakistan with chicken, carrots, cabbage, chillies, corn flour, eggs, vinegar, soy sauce and salt. It may also contain bean sprout and capsicum.

== Southeast Asia ==
=== Cambodia ===
Samlor machu pkong is a Cambodian sour soup flavored with lemon, chilis, prawns and/or shrimp. One of the most popular sour soups in Cambodia, it is eaten most often on special occasions.

Samlar machu yuon (សម្លរម្ជូរយួន) is another common hot and sour soup that originated in the Mekong Delta region. It is made with fish, usually mudfish, walking catfish or tilapia, that has first been fried or broiled then added to the broth. Chicken may also be substituted. The ingredients which give the stew its characteristic flavor may vary depending on what is available locally to the cook. Possible ingredients include various combinations of pineapple, tomato, ngo gai, fried garlic, papaya, lotus root, Asian basil (ជីក្រហម) and Bird's eye chili.

=== Thailand ===
Tom yum is a Thai soup flavored with lemon grass, lime, kaffir lime leaves, galangal, fish sauce and chilis.

Sour curry (Thai: แกงส้ม, romanized: kaeng som) is a soup-like spicy and sour Thai curry.

=== Philippines ===
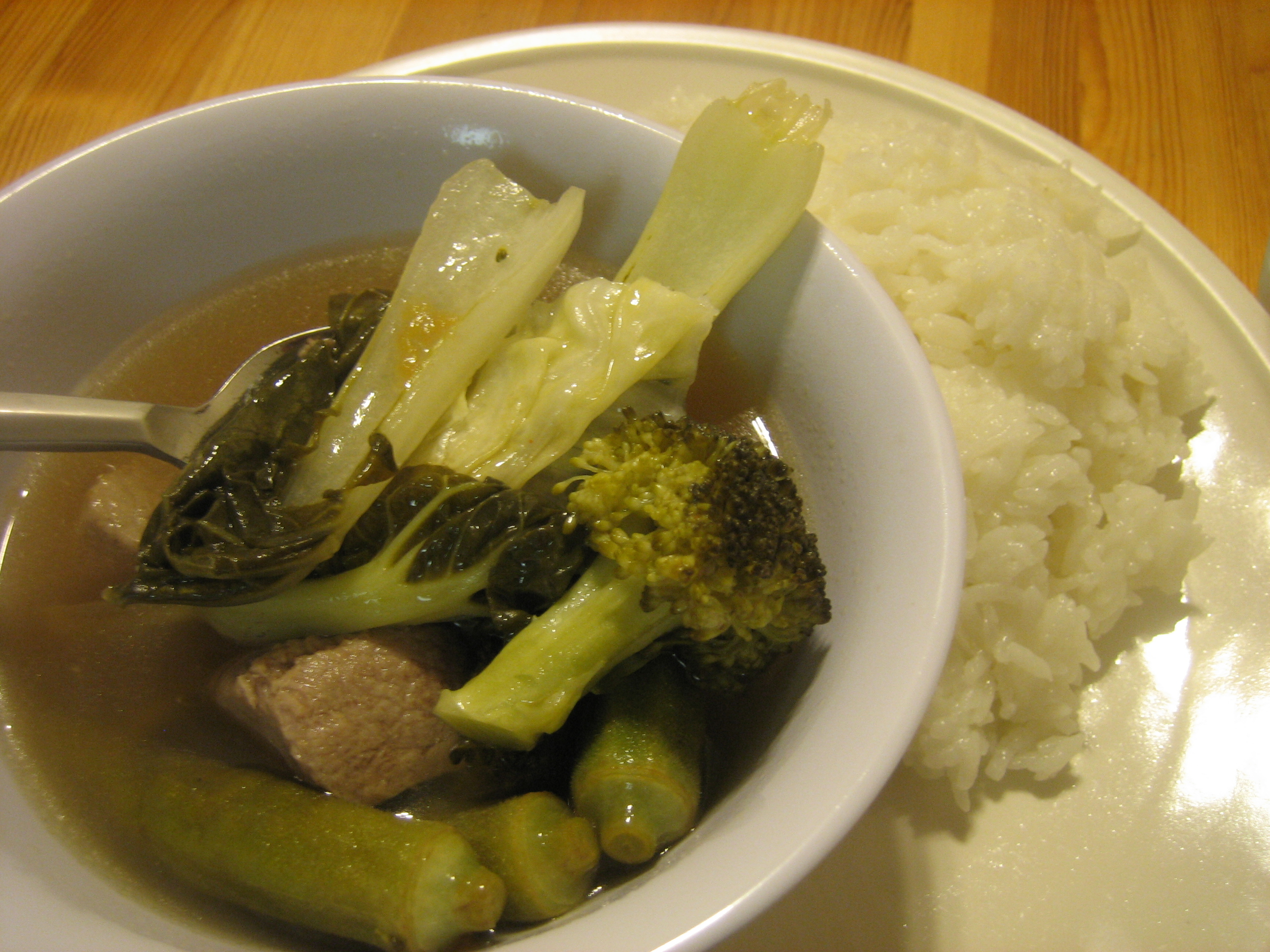
Pork sinigang from the Philippines typically use tamarind as the souring agent

There are numerous sour soup dishes in the Philippines using souring agents that range from tamarind to unripe mangoes, guavas, butterfly tree leaves (alibangbang), citruses (including the native calamansi and biasong), santol, bilimbi (kamias or iba), gooseberry tree fruits (karmay), binukaw fruits (also batuan), and libas fruits, among others. Most of these dishes are included in the umbrella term sinigang, but there are other regional dishes like sinampalukan, pinangat na isda, cansi, and linarang which are cooked slightly differently. The dishes are related to the paksiw class of dishes which are soured using vinegar. There is also the Chinese Filipino dish, known as 'Hot and Sour Soup' in English and in Hokkien Chinese: 酸辣湯／四川酸辣湯; Pe̍h-ōe-jī: Sng-loa̍h-thng / Sì-chhoan Sng-loa̍h-thng or Mandarin Chinese: 酸辣湯／四川酸辣湯; pinyin: Suānlàtāng / Sìchuān suānlàtāng in Chinese menus of Chinese restaurants across the Philippines.

=== Vietnam ===
Canh chua (literally "sour soup"), a sour soup indigenous to the Mekong River region of southern Vietnam. It is typically made with fish from the Mekong River or shrimp, pineapple, tomatoes (and sometimes also other vegetables), and bean sprouts, and flavored with tamarind and the lemony-scented herb ngò ôm (Limnophila aromatica). When made in style of a hot pot, canh chua is called lẩu canh chua.

== See also ==
- Egg drop soup
- List of Chinese dishes
- List of Chinese soups
- List of soups
- List of vegetable soups
- Hot and sour noodles
