= Hot and sour =

Hot and sour (Chinese: 酸辣; pinyin: suānlà; lit. 'sour and spicy') is a flavor combination in some Asian cuisines, especially Chinese cuisine. Notable examples include:

- Hot and sour noodles
- Hot and sour soup
- Hot and sour wontons
