= Ginataang isda =

Filipino fish stew

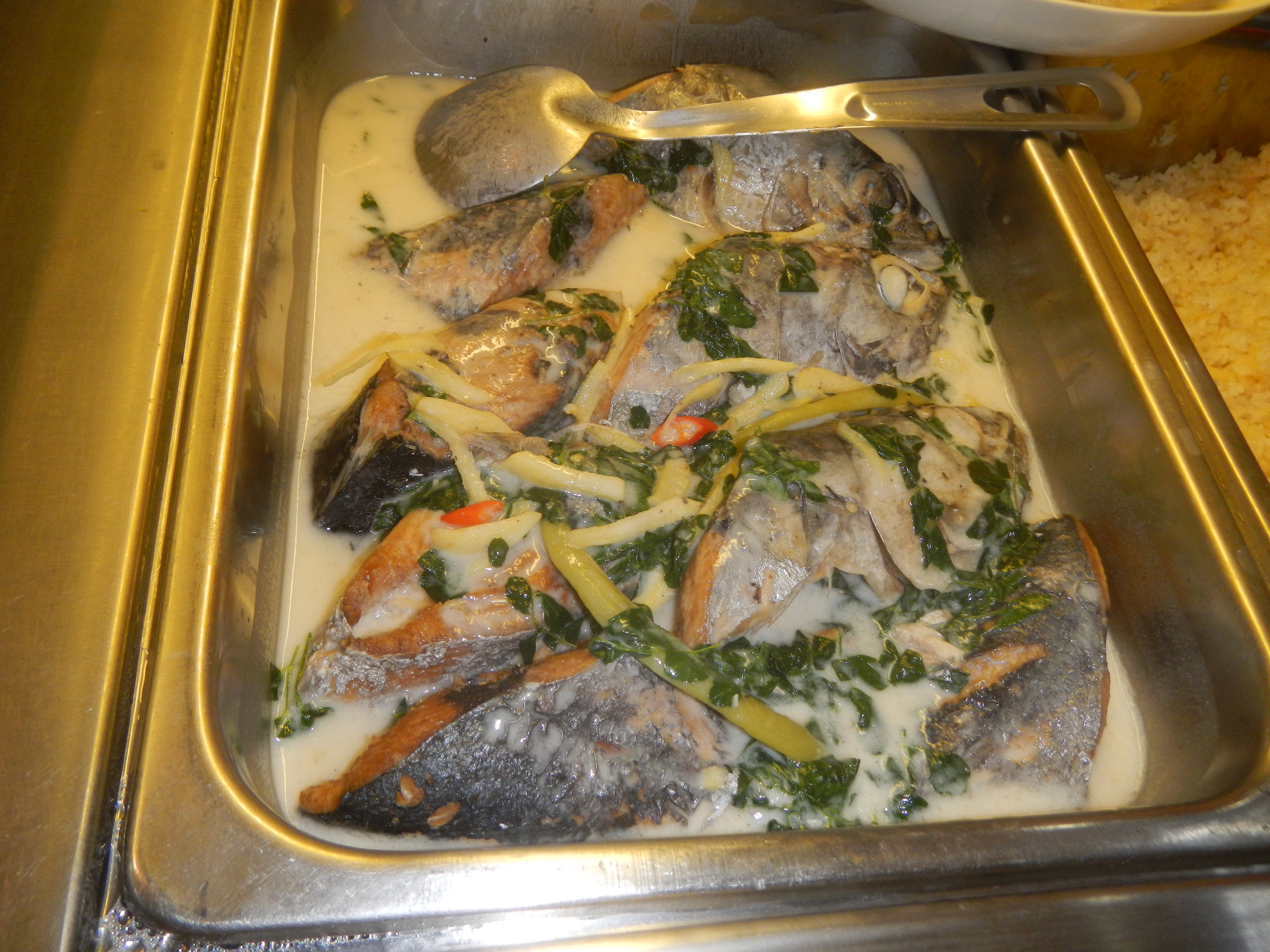
- Ginataang tambakol (tuna)
- Alternative names: Isda sa gata
- Course: Main course
- Place of origin: Philippines
- Serving temperature: Hot
- Main ingredients: Fish, coconut milk
- Variations: Ginataang paksiw na isda
- Similar dishes: Sinanglay

Ginataang isda is a Filipino fish stew made from fish and leafy vegetables in coconut milk with garlic, ginger, onion, patis (fish sauce) or bagoong alamang (shrimp paste), and salt and pepper. It is a type of ginataan. A common version of the dish, known as ginataang paksiw na isda or paksiw na isda sa gata, is additionally soured with vinegar (a cooking method known as paksiw). Ginataang isda is a type of ginataan.

== Names ==
Ginataang isda is a more generalized name meaning "fish in coconut milk". It is more common, however, to name the dish based on the type of fish used. The typical fish used in ginataang isda include: ginataang tilapia (tilapia), ginataang tambakol (yellowfin tuna), ginataang galunggong (blackfin scad), and ginataang tulingan (skipjack tuna).

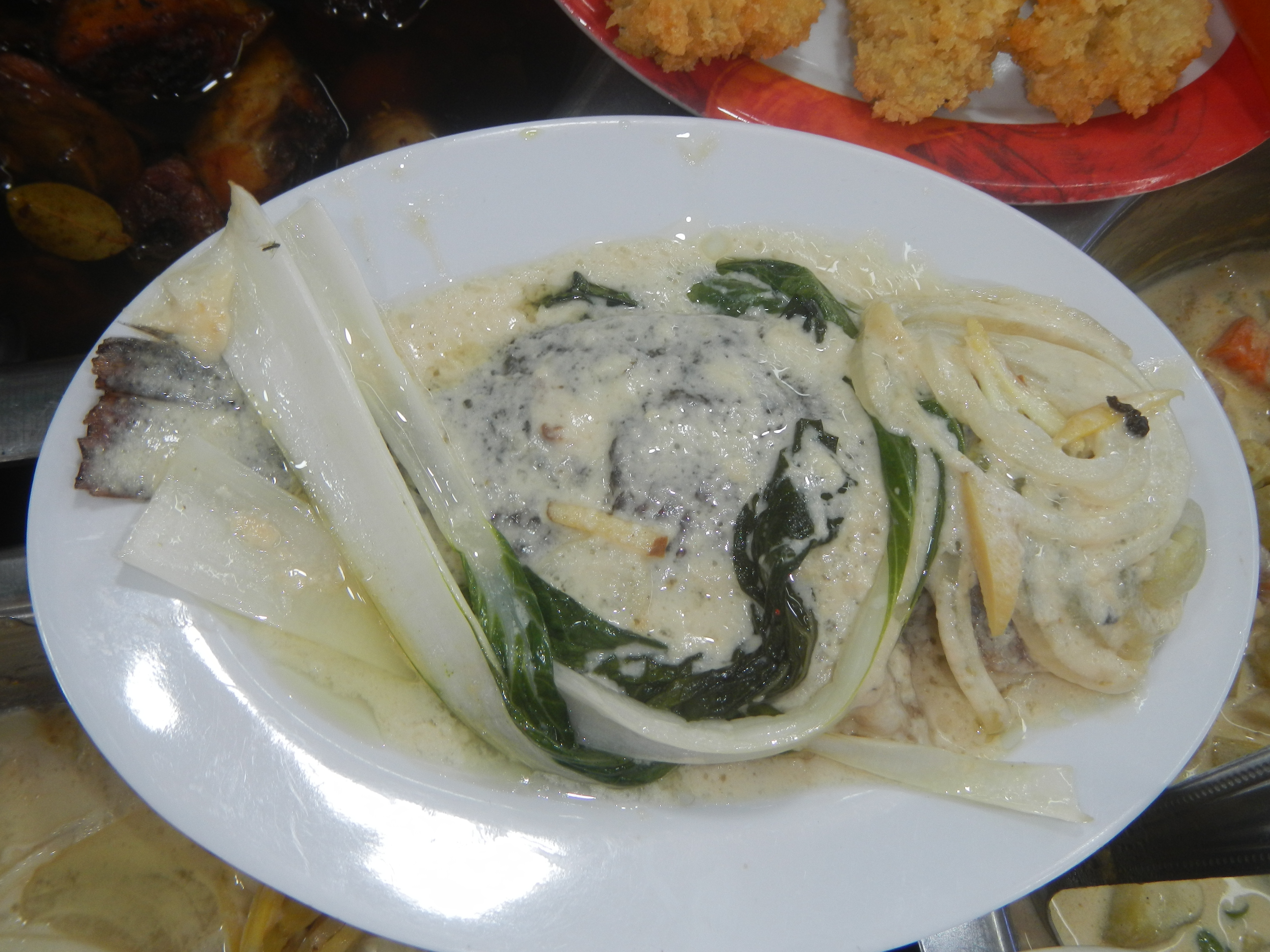
Ginataang tilapia

== Description ==
Aside from fish, the secondary ingredient of ginataang isda are leafy vegetables. These are most commonly pechay, but can also be made from other leafy vegetables like mustard greens, spinach, cabbage, and bitter melon leaves, among others. The spices used include garlic, ginger (or turmeric), onion, salt, and black pepper. For a richer flavor, patis (fish sauce) or bagoong alamang (shrimp paste) is also commonly added. A spicier version of the dish can also be created by the addition of siling haba or labuyo chilis. The coconut milk used includes both the thin coconut milk, added first, and the thicker coconut cream, added later.

== Variants ==
A common variant of the dish is ginataang paksiw na isda or paksiw na isda sa gata, which is prepared identically but differs in the addition of vinegar to sour the broth. This variant combines the ginataan and paksiw methods of cooking in Filipino cuisine.

== Similar dishes ==
Because of the ubiquity of coconut milk in Filipino cuisine, there are numerous other types of Filipino dishes that use fish in coconut milk that are considered different dishes from ginataang isda. These include dishes like linarang, kinilaw, and sinanglay, among others.

== See also ==
- Ginataang kalabasa
- Coconut soup
- List of dishes using coconut milk
- List of fish dishes
