= Sinanglay =

Filipino dish

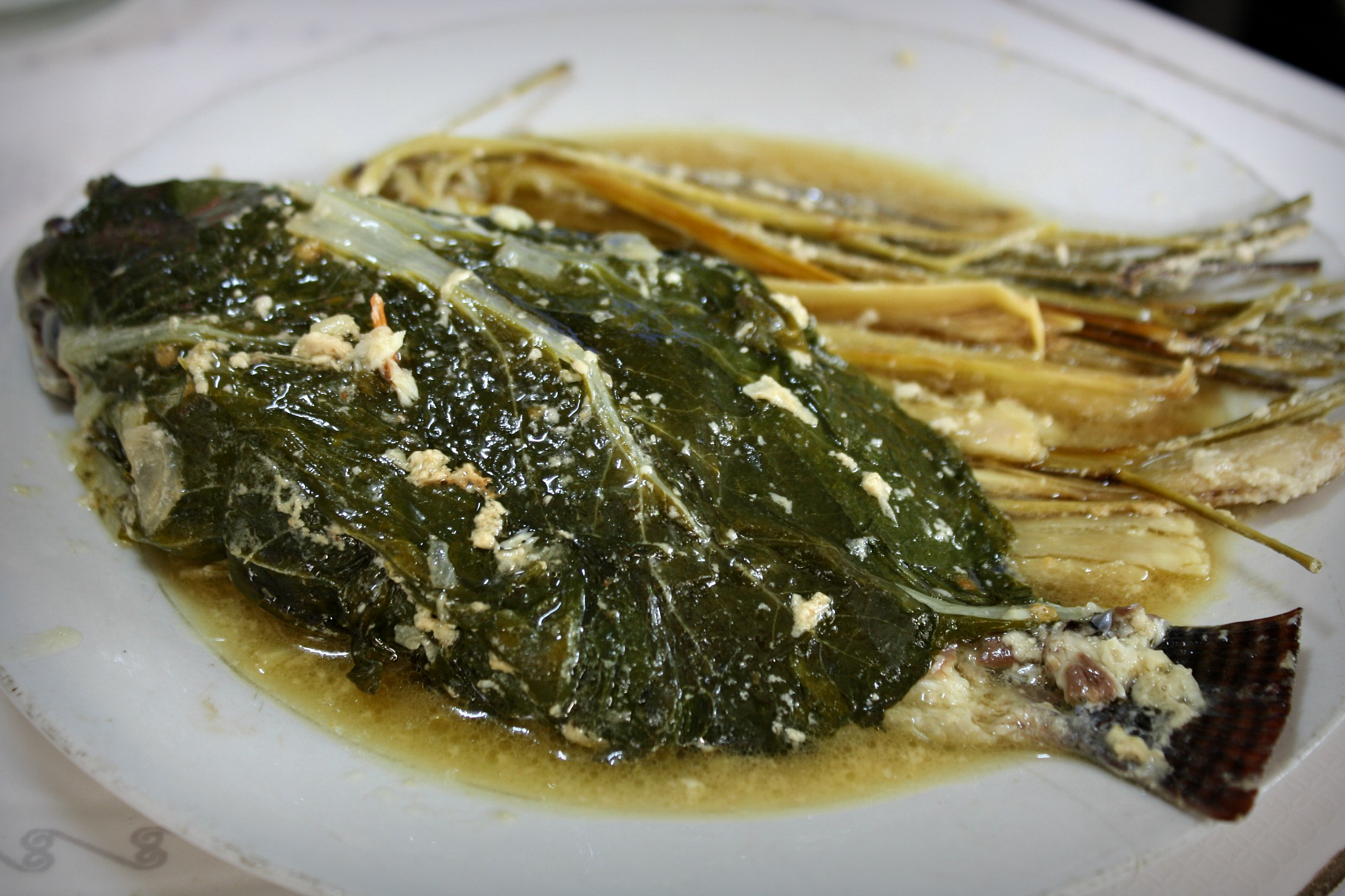
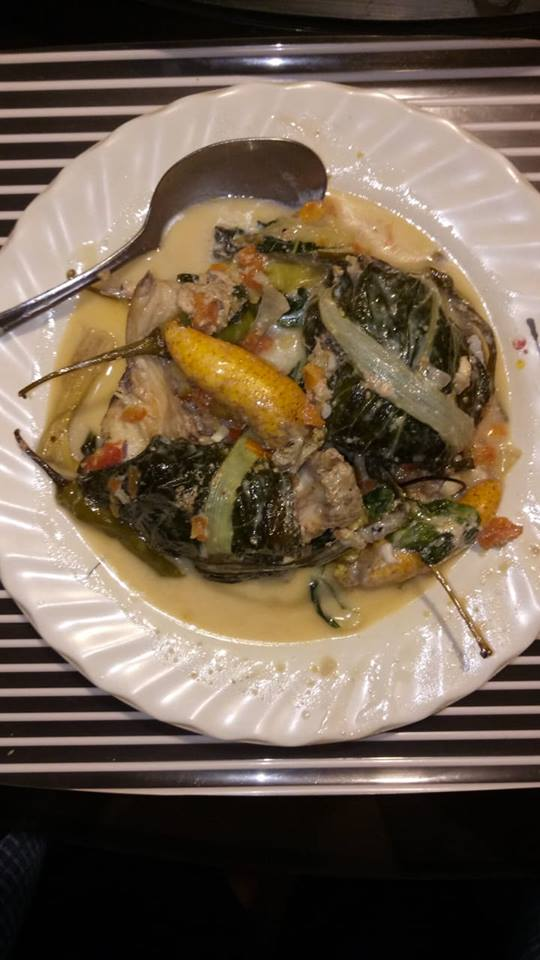
- Top: Singanglay na tilapia (tilapia); Bottom: Sinanglay na talusog (snakehead)
- Alternative names: sinanglay na isda, picadillo (pikadilyo)
- Course: Main course
- Place of origin: Philippines
- Region or state: Bicol Region
- Serving temperature: Hot
- Main ingredients: fish, coconut milk, pechay/mustard/taro/cabbage leaves, tomatoes, shallots, pandan leaves or lemongrass
- Similar dishes: ginataang isda, pinaputok na isda, laing

Sinanglay is a Filipino dish made from stuffed fish wrapped in leafy vegetables and lemongrass or pandan leaves cooked in a spicy coconut milk sauce. It is a type of ginataan and originates from the Bicol Region.

== Description ==
The fish is stuffed with a mixture of spices and vegetables. The stuffing typically include onions, scallions, garlic, tomatoes, and siling haba chilis. It is then wrapped in large leafy vegetables, usually pechay, mustard greens, taro leaves, or cabbage and tied with strips of pandan leaves or lemongrass. It is added to a stew made from coconut milk or coconut cream spiced with ginger (or turmeric), black pepper, patis (fish sauce) or bagoong alamang (shrimp paste), salt, labuyo chilis, and a souring agent (usually tamarind, calamansi, or bilimbi).

The dish is simmered for around ten to twenty minutes, stirring occasionally to prevent the coconut milk from curdling. Prawns or shrimp may sometimes be added to enhance the flavor. It is eaten with white rice.

== Variations ==
The most commonly used fish is tilapia, but it can vary extensively. Other common fish used include talusog (snakehead), hito (walking catfish), karpa (carp), puyo (climbing perch), maya-maya (red snapper), hasa-hasa (short mackerel), and pampano (pompano), among others.

== See also ==
- Ginataang isda
- List of dishes using coconut milk
- List of fish dishes
