= Pinangat =

Pinangat or Pangat is a Filipino term originating from the verb pangat ("to cook [fish] in a broth"), it can refer to:

- Laing (food), also simply called pinangat, a dish from the Bicol Region which primarily uses taro leaves and coconut milk
- Pinangat na isda, a Southern Luzon dish consisting of fish cooked in a sour broth with tomatoes
