= Kuanfen noodles =

Chinese potato noodles

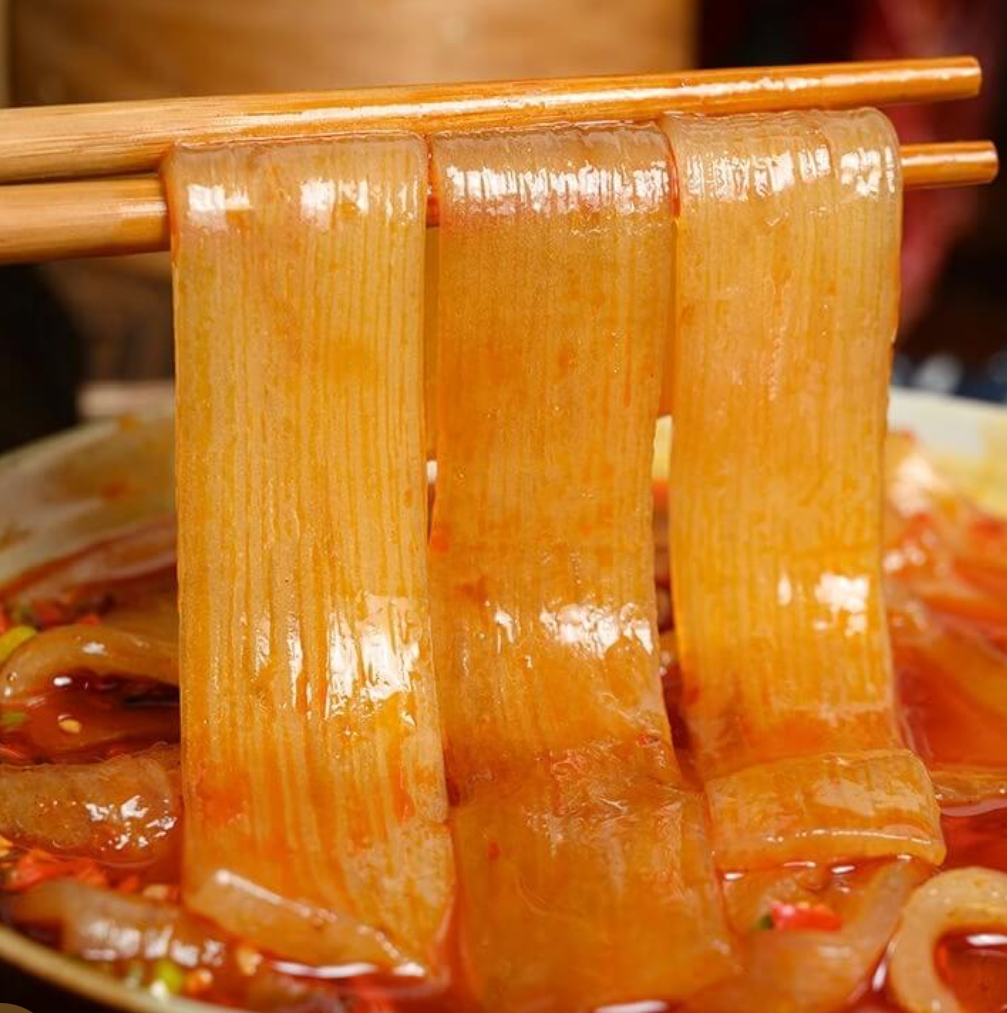
- Two wooden chopsticks lifting three thick potato noodles out of a reddish broth filled with other noodles of the same kind.
- Alternative names: 宽粉
- Type: Noodle dish
- Course: Main course
- Place of origin: China
- Associated cuisine: Sichuan cuisine
- Main ingredients: Potatoes

Kuanfen noodles (Chinese: 宽粉; pinyin: kuānfēn) are flat Chinese noodles made from potatoes. They are commonly used in malatang, hotpot and hot and sour noodles (suanlafen). They can also be made from purple potatoes.

Kuanfen, at least four to five centimeters wide, reflects the "big" (Chinese: 大) aesthetic of the northwestern China: spacious landscapes, hearty food, tradition of smashing the wine bowl (Chinese: 摔碗酒).

== Sources ==
- Yuan, Mei‐Lan; Lu, Zhan‐Hui; Cheng, Yong‐Qiang; Li, Li‐Te (2007). "Suitability of Different Starches for Production of Kuanfen (Chinese Flat Starch Noodles)". Cereal Chemistry. 84 (3): 285–289. doi:10.1094/CCHEM-84-3-0285. ISSN 0009-0352.
- Zhang, Ziyi (2024-08-01). 寻味西北 [Seeking the Taste of the Northwest] (in Chinese). Hebei Education Press. ISBN 978-7-5545-8462-0.
