= Sinigang =

Filipino sour soup

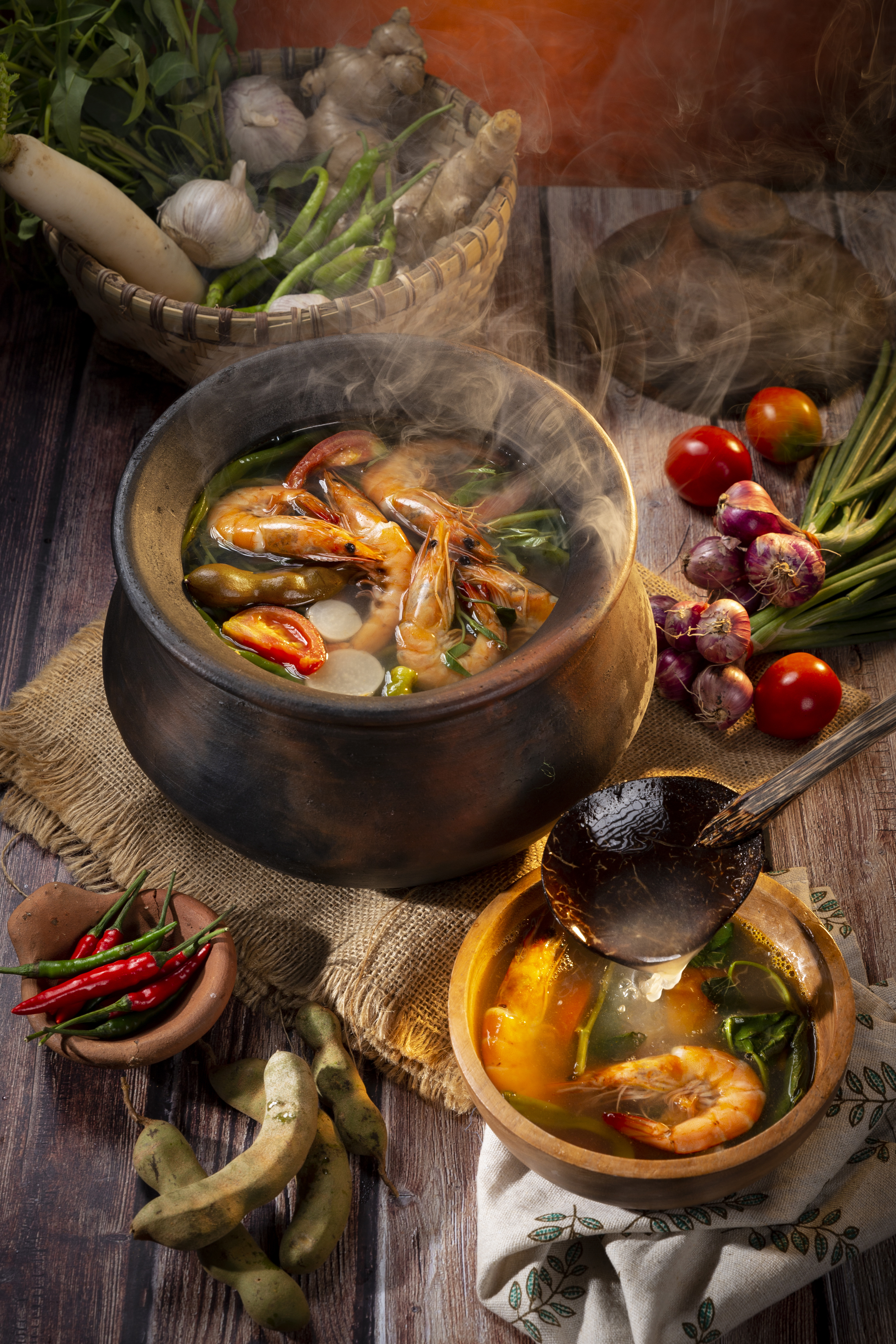
- Shrimp Sinigang (Sinigang na Hipon)
- Type: Soup or stew
- Course: Main course
- Place of origin: Philippines
- Region or state: Tagalog region
- Serving temperature: Hot
- Main ingredients: Meat, vegetables, tamarind, fish sauce, onions, siling mahaba, tomatoes
- Variations: Pork, beef, shrimp, fish, chicken
- Food energy (per serving): ~120
- Similar dishes: Pinangat na isda, paksiw, kansi, kadyos, baboy, kag langka
- Other information: Can be served in many different forms

Sinigang, sometimes anglicized as sour broth, is a Filipino soup or stew characterized by its sour and savory taste. It is most often associated with tamarind (Filipino: sampalok), although it can use other sour fruits and leaves as the souring agent such as unripe mangoes or rice vinegar. It is one of the more popular dishes in Filipino cuisine. This soup, like most Filipino dishes, is usually accompanied by rice. Fish sauce is a common condiment for this stew.

== Origin ==
Sinigáng means "stewed [dish]"; it is nominalized in the form of the Tagalog verb sigáng, "to stew". While present nationwide, sinigáng is seen to be culturally Tagalog in origin. Thus, similar sour stews and soups found in other parts of Luzon, the Visayas, and Mindanao (like Central Visayan linarang and in Kapampangan bulanglang) are regarded as separate dishes which differ in the ingredients used.

== Ingredients ==
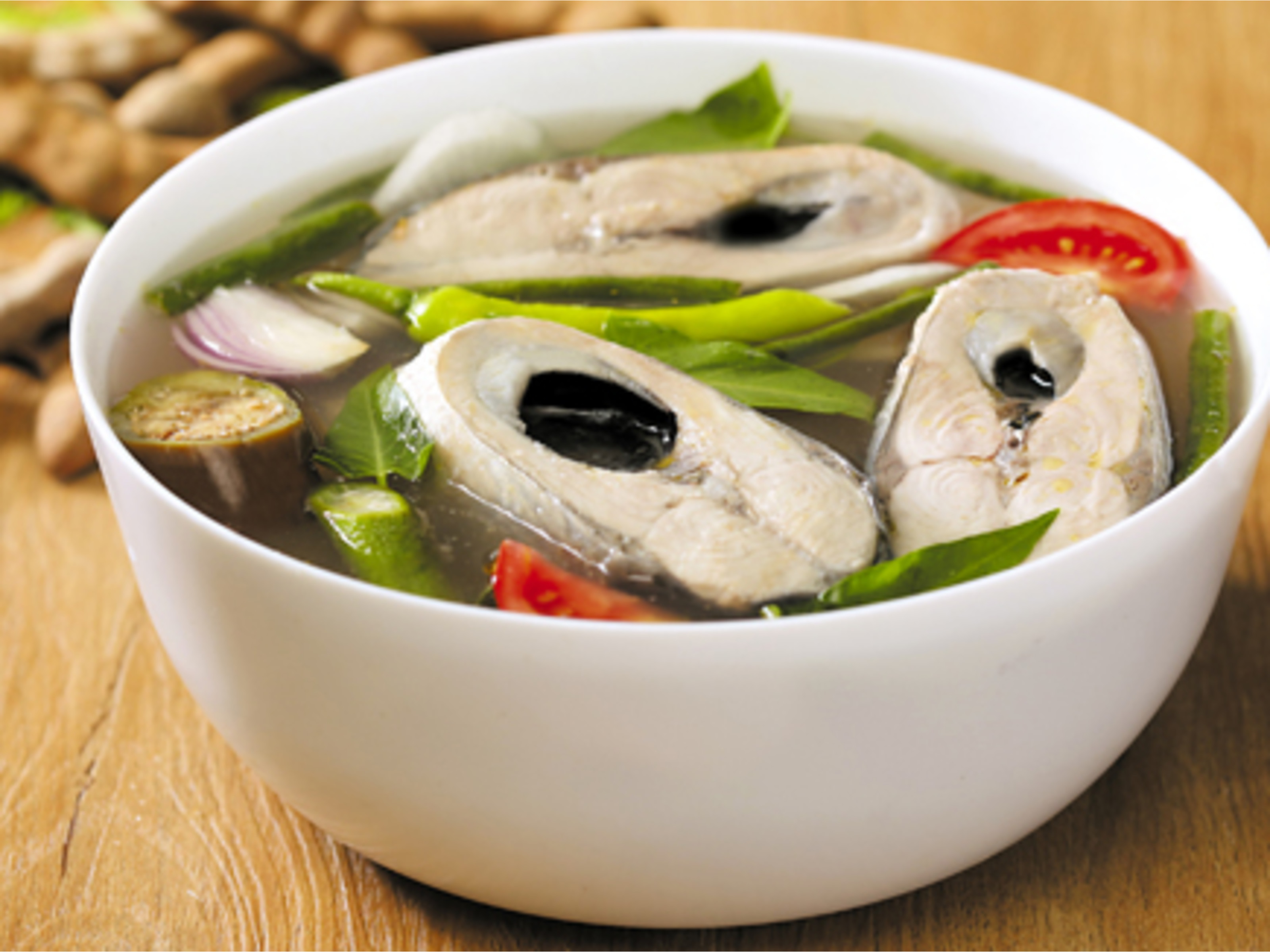
Fish sinigang

Sinigang is most often associated with tamarind in modern times, but it originally referred to any meat or seafood cooked in a sour and acidic broth, similar to but differentiated from paksíw (which uses vinegar). Other variations of the dish derive their sourness from native ingredients. These souring agents include unripe mangoes, rice vinegar, butterfly tree leaves (alibangbáng), citruses (including the native calamansi and biyasong), santól, bilimbi (kamiás or ibà), gooseberry tree fruits (karmay), binukaw fruits (also batuan), and libas fruits, among others. Guava, introduced to the Philippines via the Manila galleons, is also used. Soup powder or bouillon cubes with a tamarind base are commercial alternatives to using natural fruits.

Sinigang typically uses meat or seafood (e.g., fish, pork, beef, shrimp, or chicken) stewed with tamarind, tomatoes, garlic, and onions. Other vegetables commonly used in the making of sinigang include okra, taro corms (gabi, which serves as a starchy broth thickener), white radish (labanós), water spinach (kangkóng), yardlong beans (sitaw) and eggplant (talóng). Most Filipinos like to cook sinigang with long green peppers (siling habâ) to enhance the taste and add a little spice to the dish. Another variation includes adding locally made miso.

== Sinigang variations ==
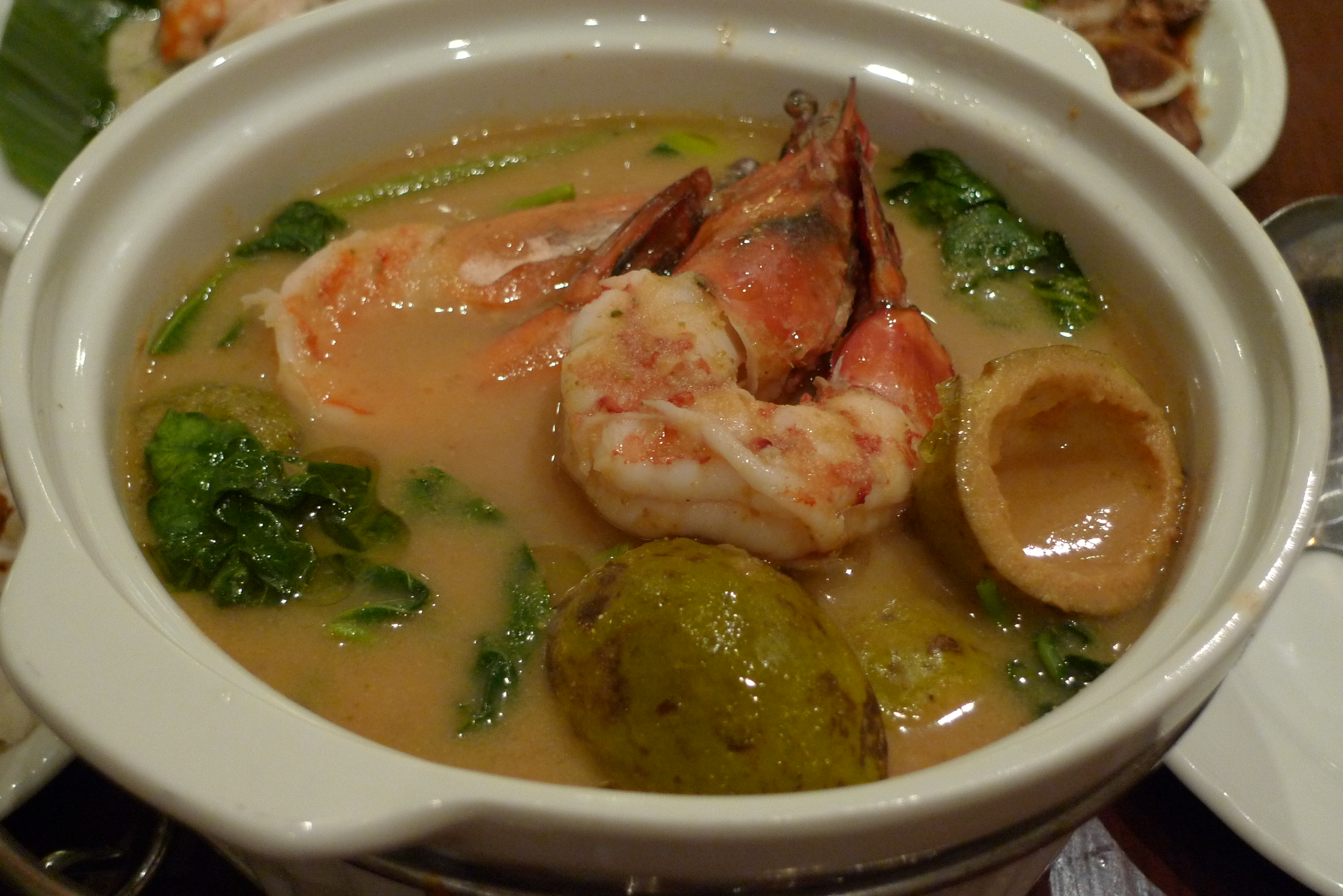
Sinigang na hipon (shrimp) with unripe guavas

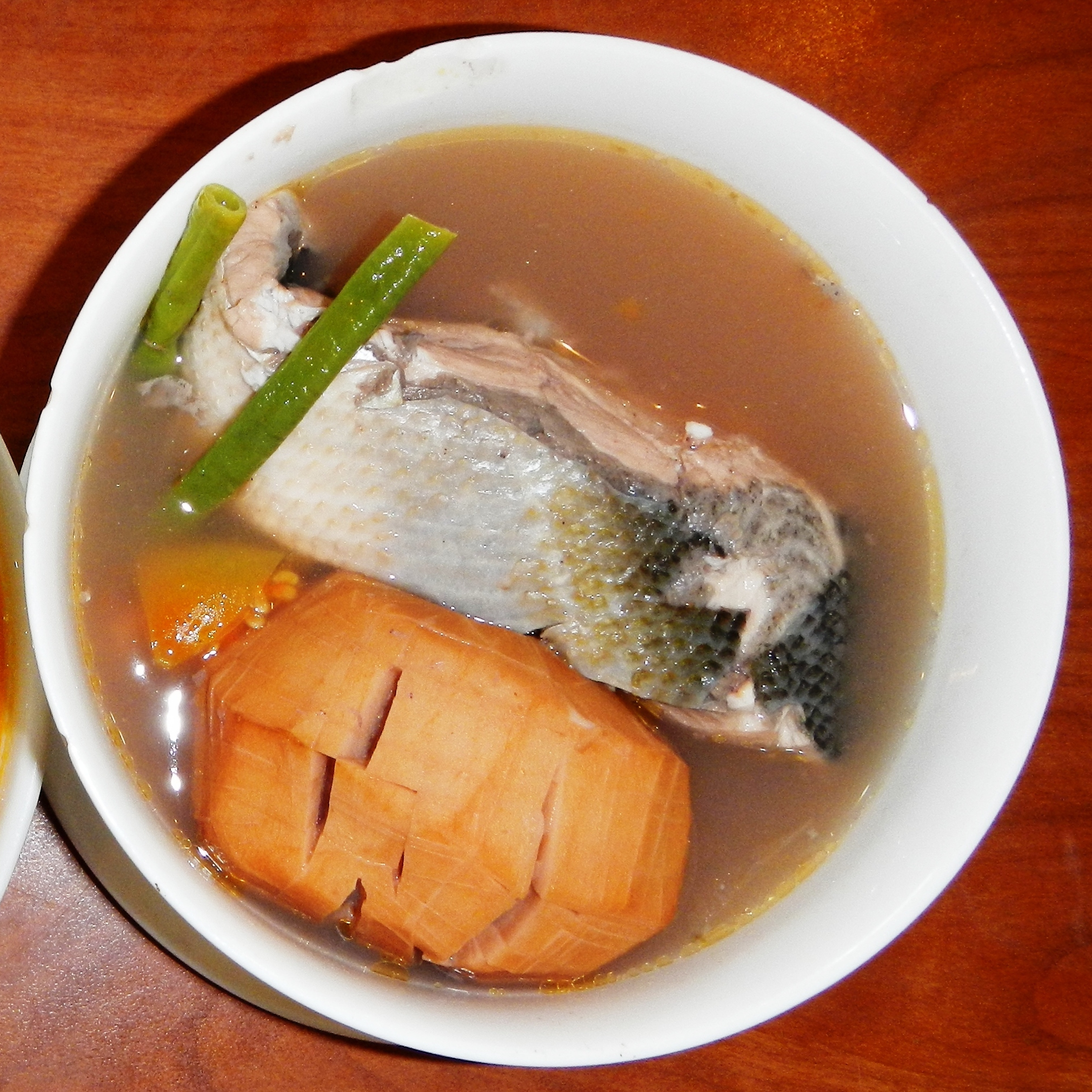
Sinigang na isda with milkfish (bangus) and santol

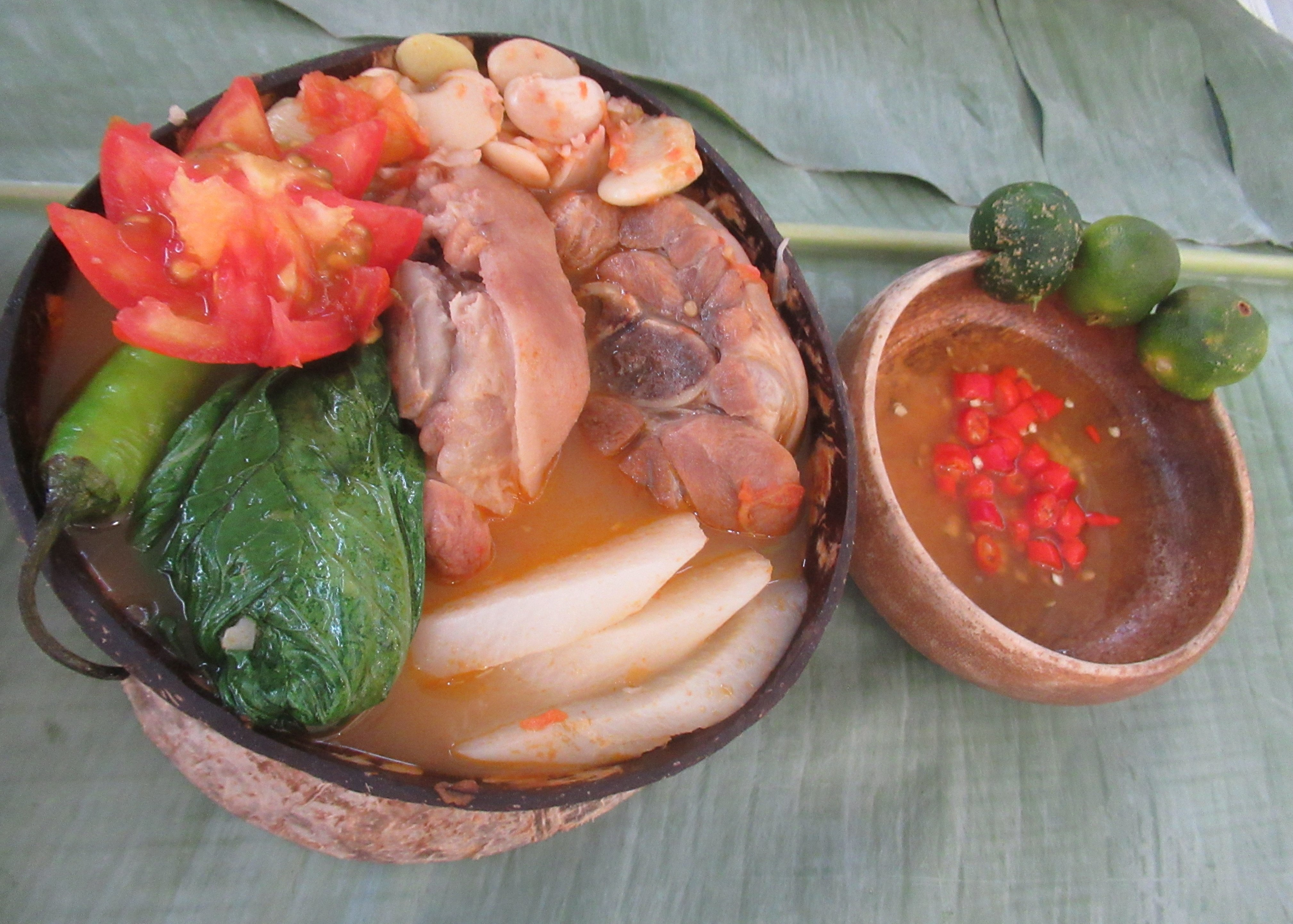
"Bule Baluga king Pata"

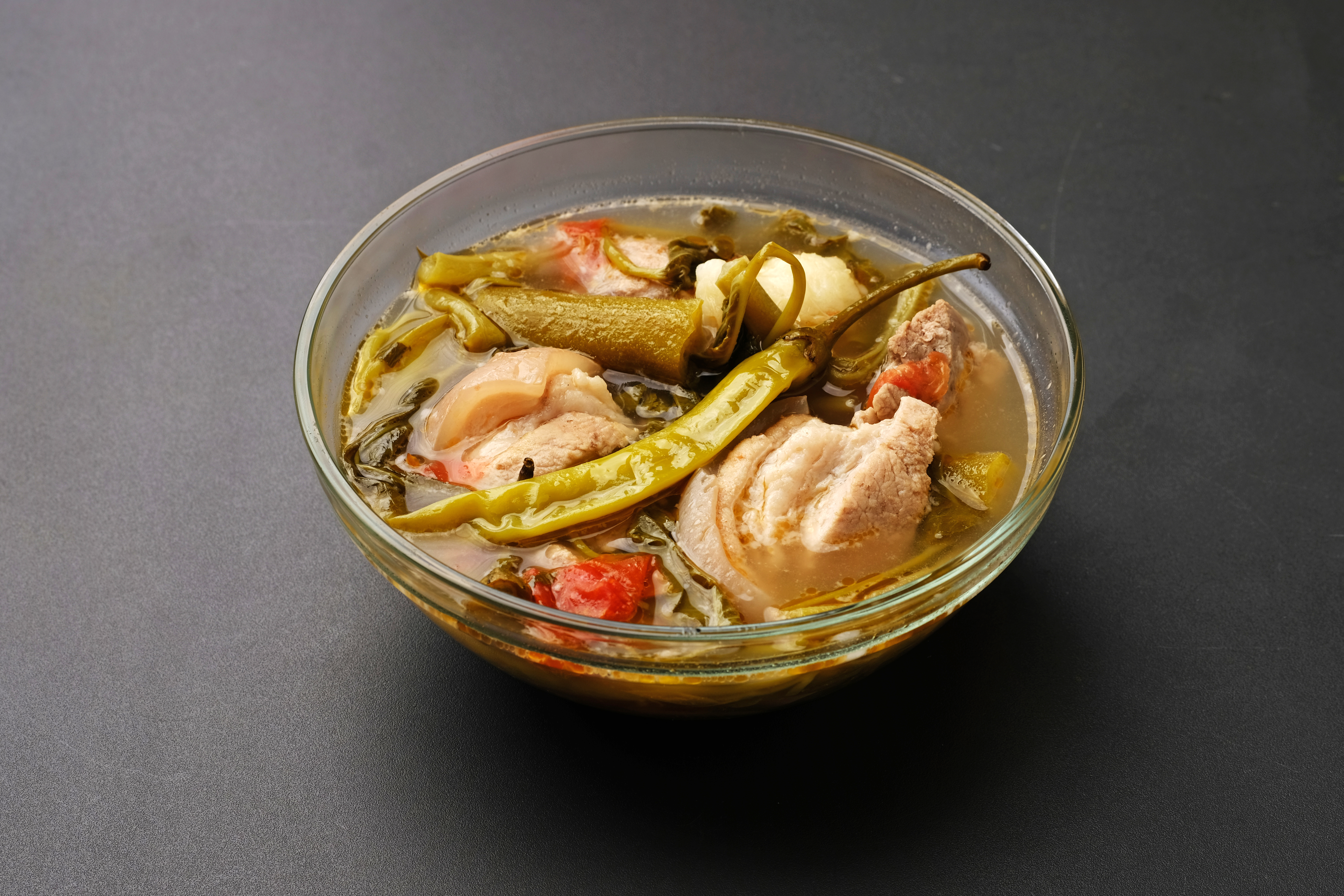
Sinigang na Baboy (pork)

- Sinigáng na baboy - Pork Sinigang
- Sinigáng sa misô - Sinigang with miso added to the soup as the umami element, usually with a tamarind base
- Sinigáng sa bayabas - Sinigang that uses guava as the sour soup base
- Sinigang sa mangga - Sinigang that uses unripe mango as the sour soup base
- Sinigang sa kalamansi - Sinigang that uses calamansi or lemon as the sour soup base
- Sinigáng na isdâ - Fish sinigang
- Sinigang sa pakwan - Sinigang that uses watermelon together with tamarind as the sour soup base
- Sinigáng na hipon - Shrimp or prawn sinigang
- Sinigang na baka - Beef sinigang
- Seafood sinigang - Fish, shrimp, squid, seashells are combined in this soup
- Bule - A variant of sinigang from the Aeta people of Pampanga that uses lima beans (bule) and is soured with alibangbang (butterfly tree) leaves. Formerly called as bule baluga, the dish is now known mostly as bule due to the controversial term baluga, a derogatory and racist word towards Aetas.

== Similar dishes ==
Sinampalukang manók or sinampalukan is technically not a variation of sinigang, as the chicken has to be sautéed in ginger first instead of all the ingredients being placed simultaneously into the pot and brought to a boil. Sinampalukan is also distinguished by its use of shredded tamarind leaves, and is usually made together with ginger, onions, tomatoes, eggplant and other vegetables.

Other Filipino dishes that are similar to sinigang but distinct include pinangat na isda from Southern Luzon and linarang from Cebu. Both of which also use sour fruits but are restricted to fish or seafood and differ in the other ingredients used.

Another similar dish is inalseman, an Ilocano vegetable soup that is a sour variation of dinengdeng. It is typically composed of long beans, jute mallow (saluyot), yam beans, taro, green papaya and young tamarind fruits and leaves, seasoned with bugguóng (fermented fish sauce).

There are also similar soured beef stews. They include the cansi from the Western Visayas islands which use beef and breadfruit and is soured with batuan or bilimbi fruits. Because it resembles a cross between bulalo and sinigang it is sometimes known as sinigang na bulalo. Another soured beef stew is sinanglaw from Ilocos which is soured with bilimbi or tamarind, but is unique in that it also includes bitter ingredients like bitter gourd or bile, as is common in Ilocano cuisine.

=== Malaysia ===
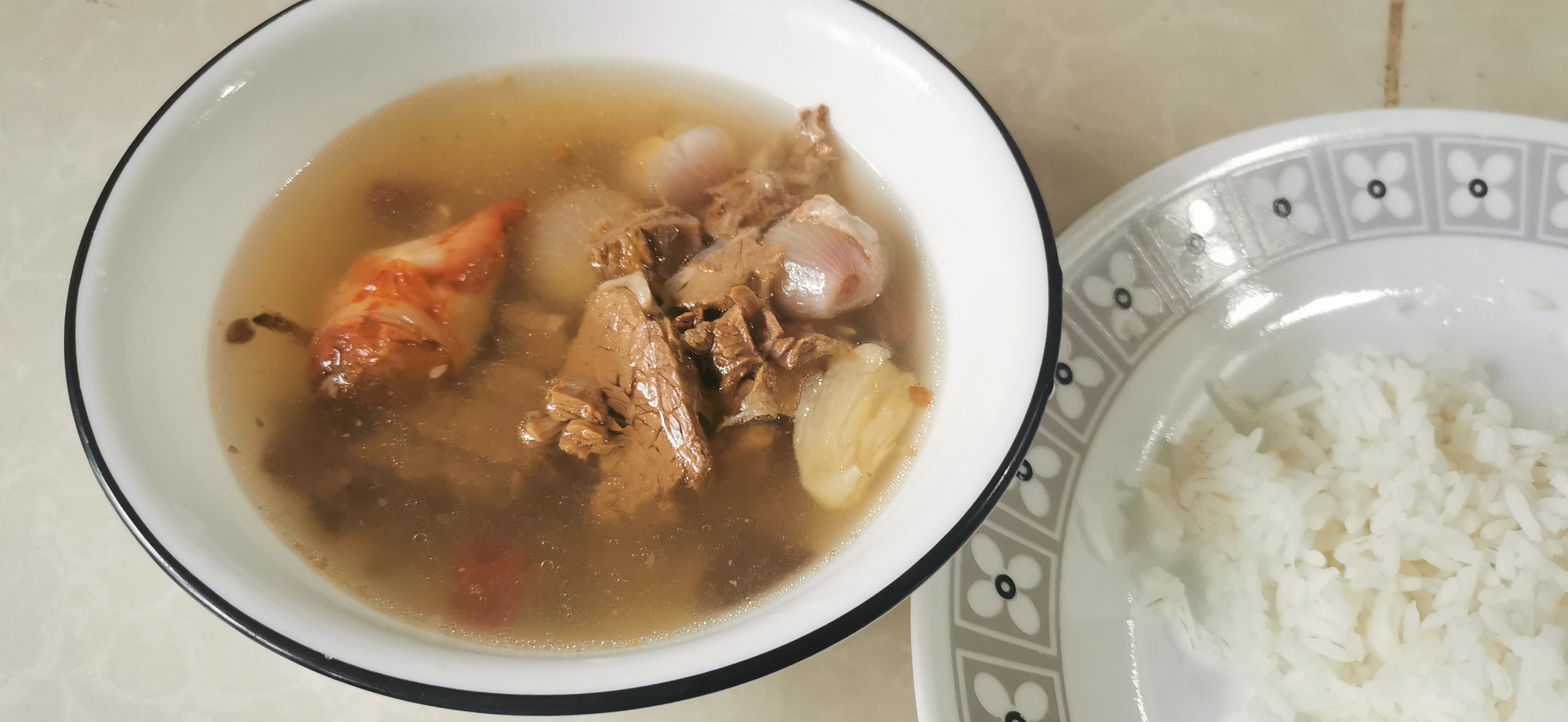
Beef sinigang

Around the east coast of Peninsular Malaysia, particularly in the states of Kelantan and Terengganu, there is a dish called singgang that is considered a close relative of sinigang. The common ingredients found in singgang are lemongrass, galangal, garlic, chili and asam gelugur as a souring agent. Either budu or tempoyak would also sometimes be added to further flavourize the dish. Terengganu's singgang and Kelantan's singgang differ through an addition of turmeric into the former.

Meanwhile, on the west coast of Peninsular Malaysia, another dish that is thought to be similar to singgang is called pindang.

== Awards ==
The TasteAtlas 2021 Awards named "Sinigang" the best soup. It bested the Romanian cuisine Ciorbă de fasole cu afumătură and shōyu ("soy sauce") ramen of Japan. TasteAtlas 2023 chose the dish as one of the Best Dishes in the World, defeating żurek, steak au poivre, and pho bo.

== See also ==
- Cansi
- Canh chua
- Hot and sour soup
- Sayur asem
- Pindang
- Puchero
- Tom yum
- List of soups
- List of stews
- Filipino cuisine
