= Liver spread =

Filipino condiment spread

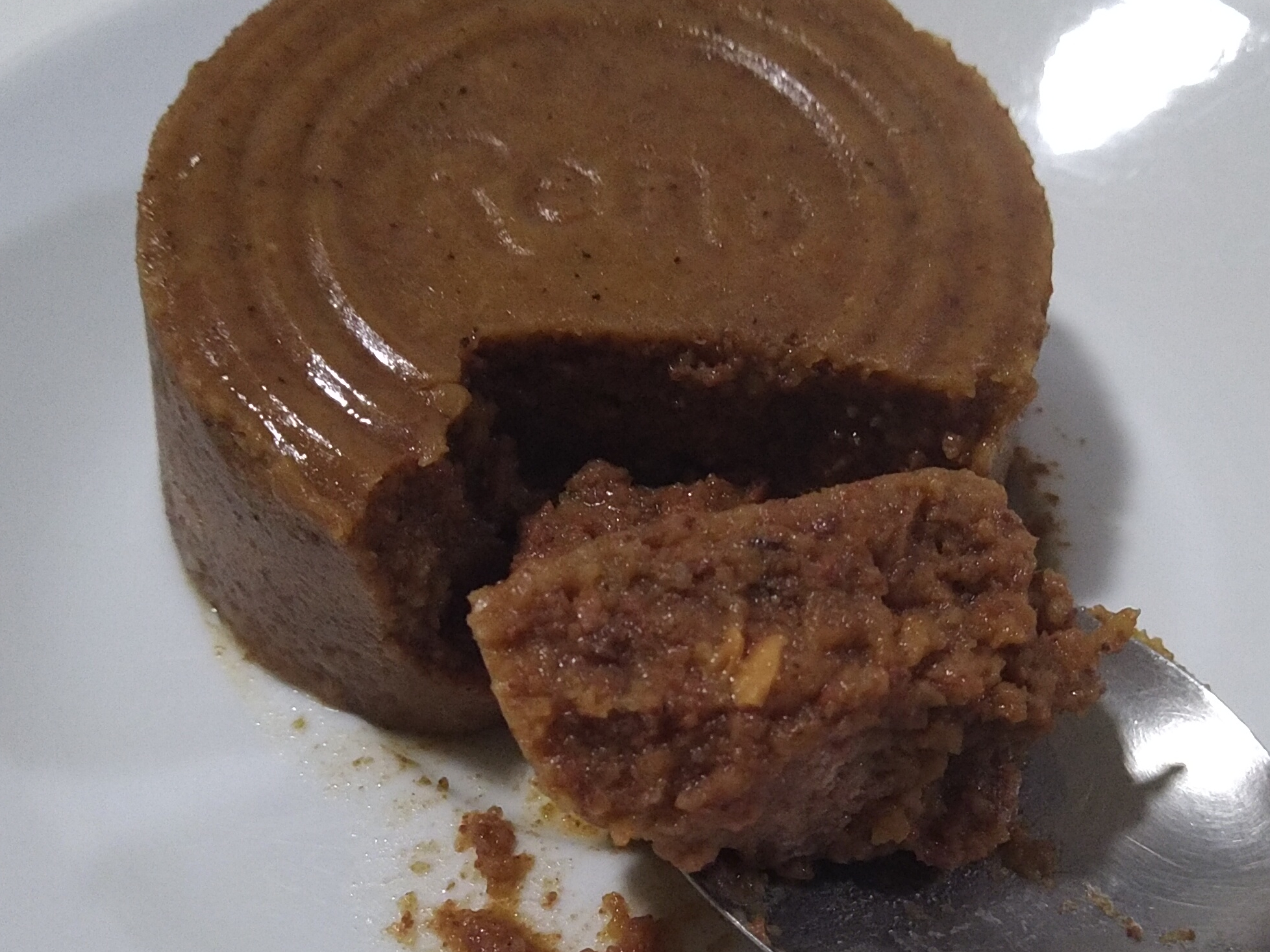
- Type: spread
- Place of origin: Philippines
- Main ingredients: Beef, pork and/or chicken liver, cereal, offal

Liver spread is a Filipino canned spread product made from pureed pork, beef, or chicken liver mixed with cereal and/or offal, similar to the French pâté and German liverwurst. Liver spread is usually eaten as a filling for sandwich bread and an accompaniment to crackers, but it is also used as an ingredient in dishes like lechon sauce and the Tagalog version of paksiw na lechon. It is also used in some households as an ingredient in dishes like caldereta and Filipino spaghetti.

== See also ==
- Banana ketchup
- Mama Sita's Holding Company
