= Pinangat na isda =

Filipino dish from Southern Luzon

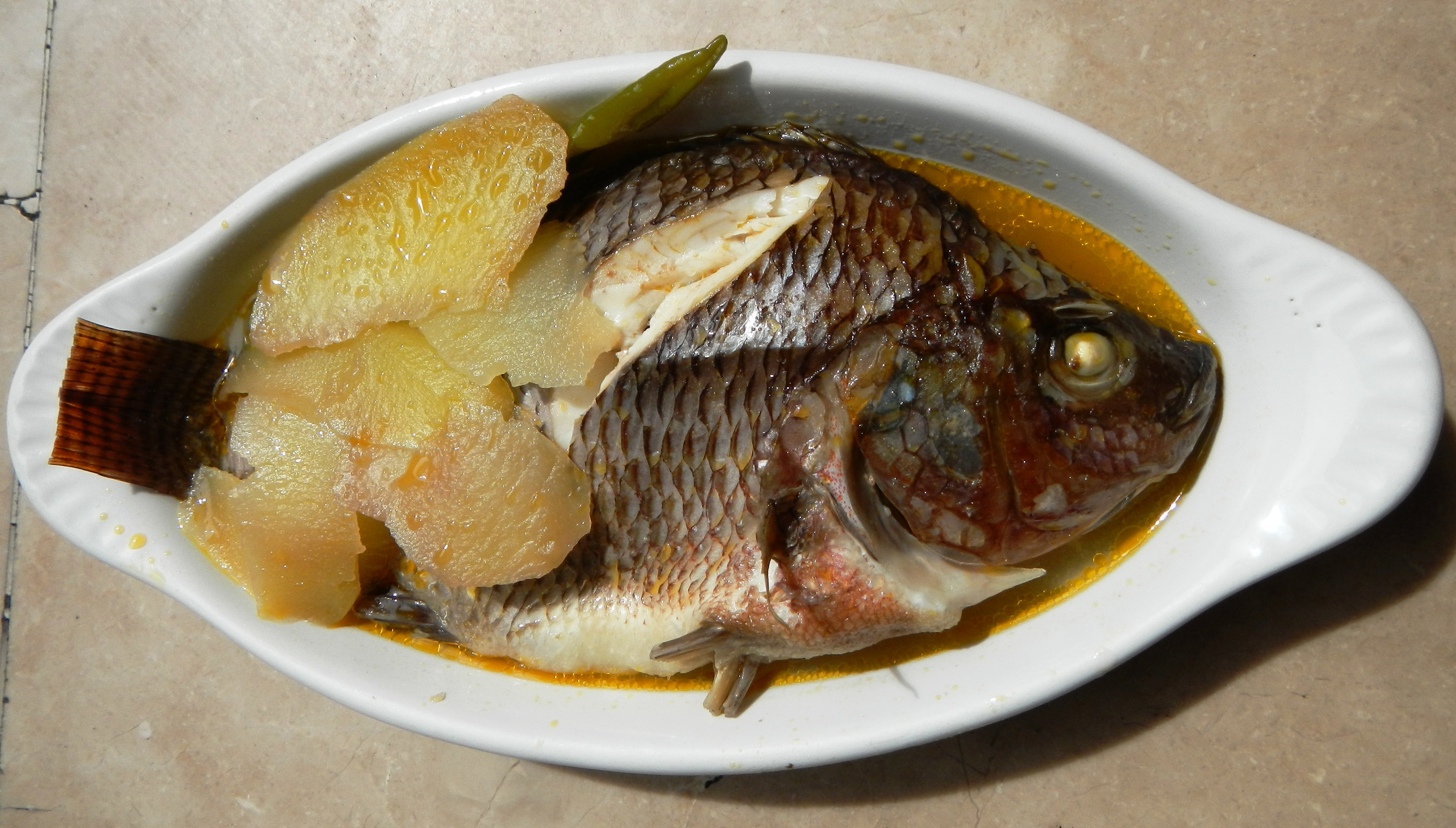
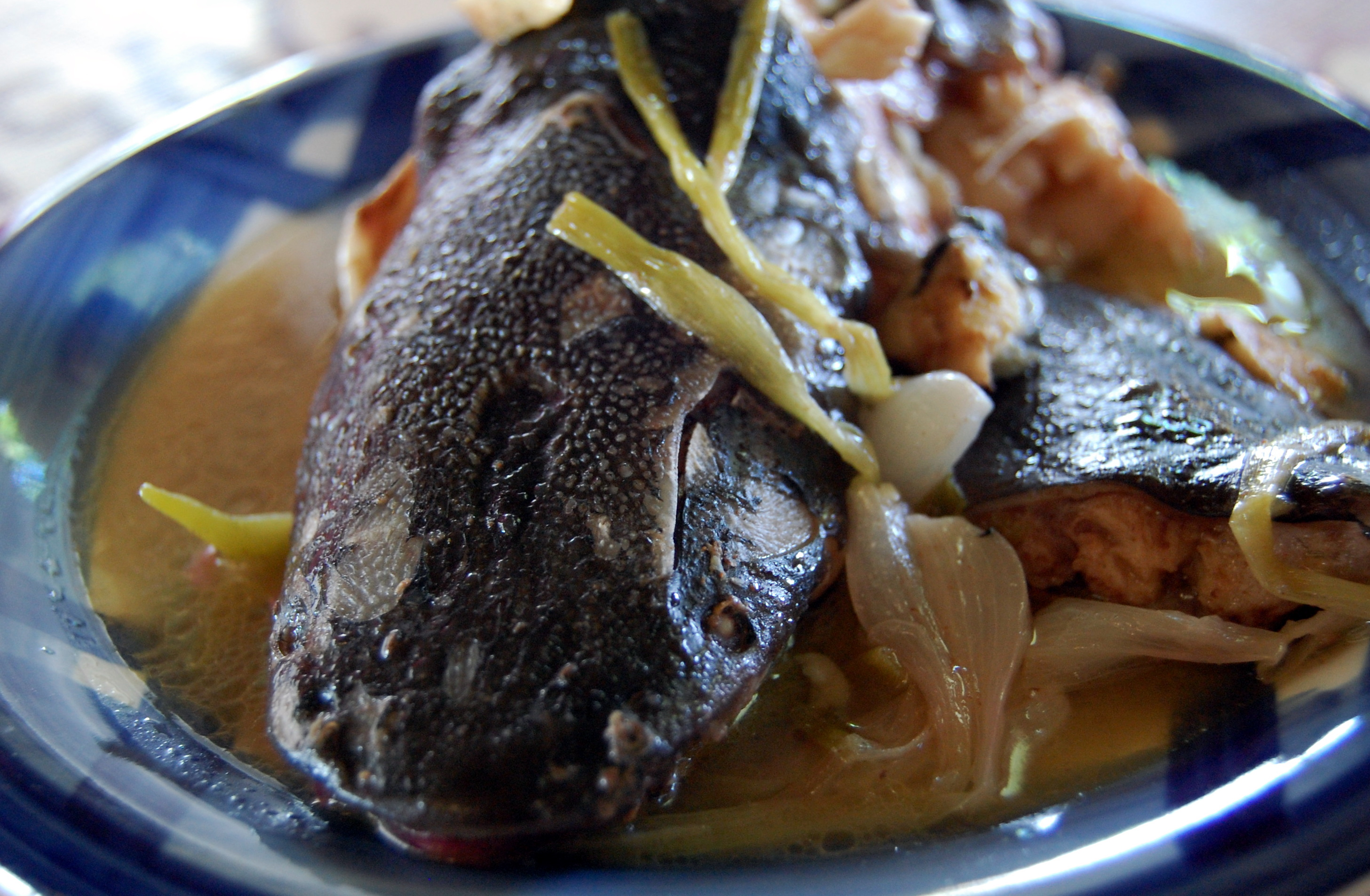
- Top: Pinangat na tilapia with green mangoes Bottom: Pinangat na hito (catfish)
- Type: Stew
- Place of origin: Philippines
- Region or state: Southern Luzon
- Created by: Filipino cuisine
- Main ingredients: Fish, tomatoes, salt, souring agent (calamansi, bilimbi, tamarind, santol, etc.)
- Similar dishes: Sinigang, paksiw

Pinangat na isda, also called pangat na isda, is a Filipino dish from Southern Luzon consisting of fish and tomatoes stewed in a broth soured with fruits like calamansi, bilimbi, tamarind, or santol. It can also be used to cook shrimp. It is similar to sinigang, but it is not as tart.

Pinangat na isda may also sometimes be referred to as paksiw, a related but different dish which primarily uses vinegar to sour the broth. Pinangat na isda is also commonly confused with laing (also called pinangat na laing or pinangat na gabi), a Bicolano dish also known simply as pinangat. But they are different dishes.

Emilio Aguinaldo’s favorite dish is home cooked pinangat na isda. A top Filipino cuisine, it is steamed fish like tilapia with a fusion of ground chicharrón, patís, burong mangga, labanos or tomato with unsoy sprigs. The steamed fish variations can include Alakaak, Bakoko, Bangus, Bisugo, Bugaong, Hito, Kitang or Sapsap.

== See also ==
- Ginataang isda
- Linarang
- Sinampalukan
- Tinola
- Cuisine of the Philippines
