= Gymnothorax richardsonii =

Conservation status
- Least Concern (IUCN 3.1)

Scientific classification
- Kingdom: Animalia
- Phylum: Chordata
- Class: Actinopterygii
- Order: Anguilliformes
- Family: Muraenidae
- Genus: Gymnothorax
- Species: G. richardsonii

Binomial name
- Gymnothorax richardsonii (Bleeker, 1852)

Species of fish

Gymnothorax richardsonii is a moray eel found in coral reefs in the Pacific and Indian oceans. It was first named by Pieter Bleeker in 1852, and is commonly known as the Richardson's moray, little moray, spotted-lip moray, or the Y-lined moray. It is known as Bakasi in Cordova, Cebu, in the Philippines.
