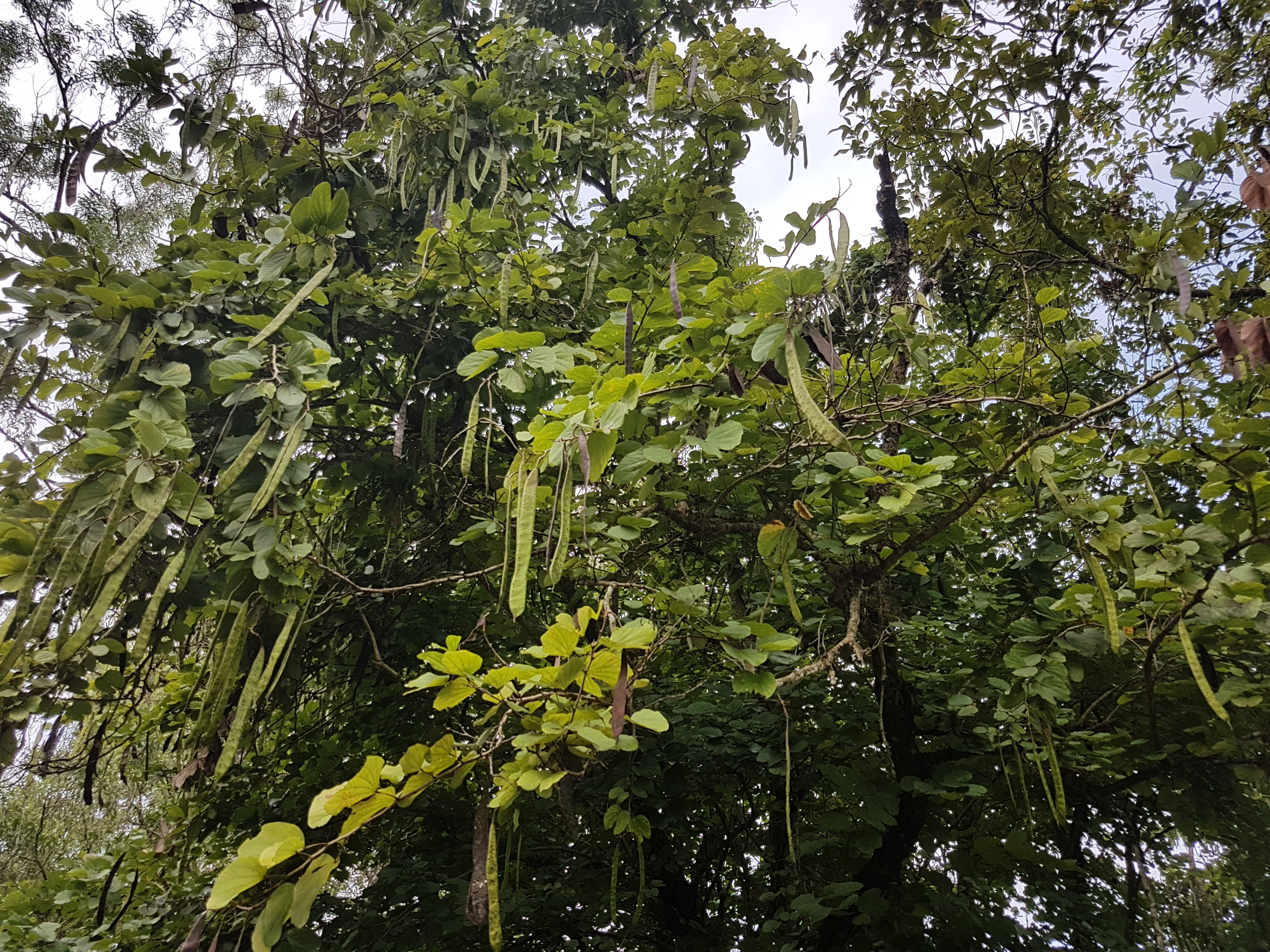
- Tree with fruits from Mindanao, Philippines
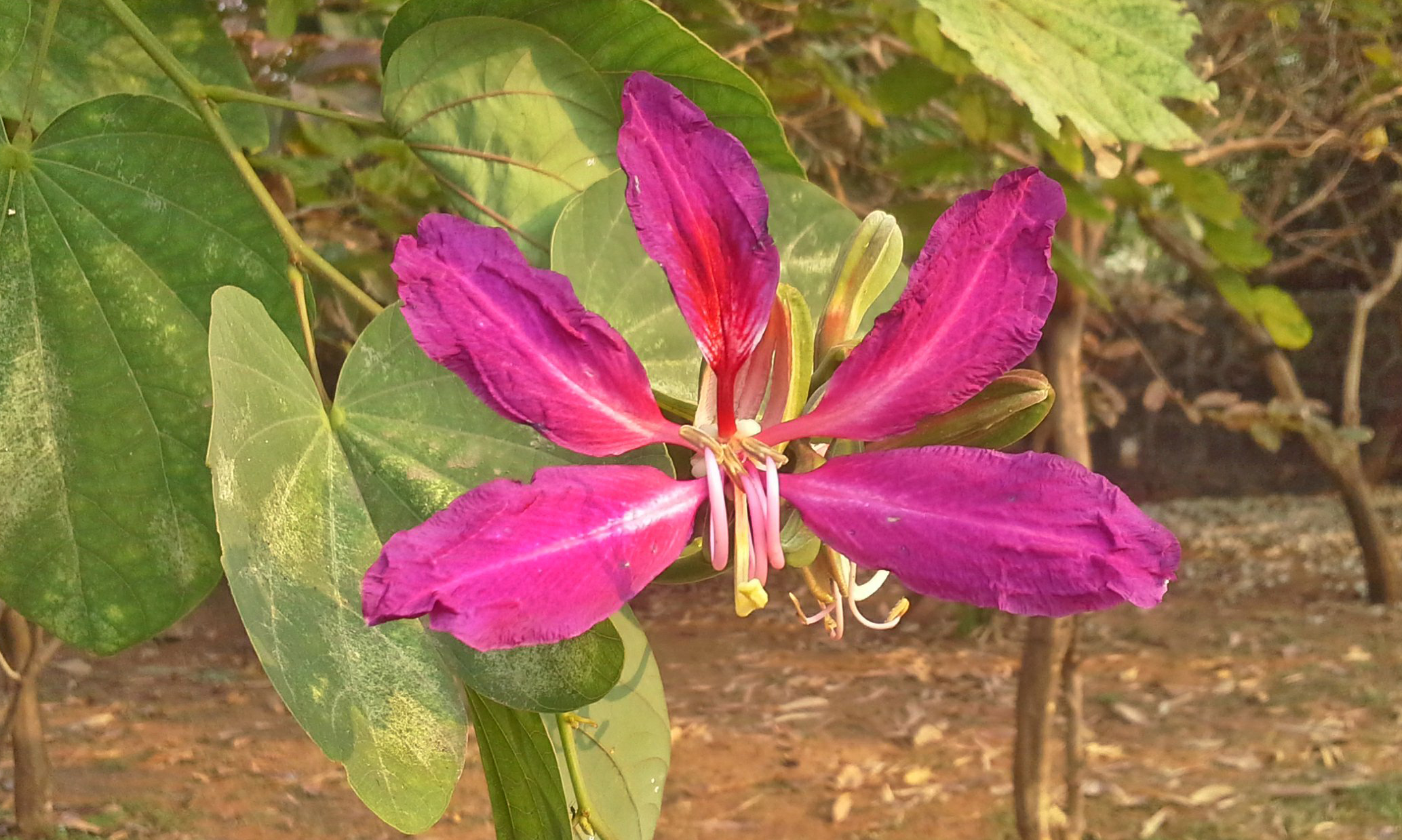
- Flower at Andhra Pradesh, India

Scientific classification
- Kingdom: Plantae
- Clade: Tracheophytes
- Clade: Angiosperms
- Clade: Eudicots
- Clade: Rosids
- Order: Fabales
- Family: Fabaceae
- Genus: Bauhinia
- Species: B. purpurea

Binomial name
- Bauhinia purpurea L.

Synonyms
- Bauhinia castrata Blanco; Bauhinia coromandeliana DC.; Bauhinia kurzii Prain; Bauhinia rosea Kurz; Bauhinia triandra Roxb.; Caspareopsis purpurea (L.) Pittier; Casparia castrata (Blanco) Hassk.; Perlebia purpurea (L.) A.Schmitz; Phanera kurzii (Prain) Thoth.; Phanera purpurea (L.) Benth.; Phanera rosea Rich. ex Teijsm. & Binn.; Telestria purpurea (L.) Raf.

= Bauhinia purpurea =

Species of legume

Bauhinia purpurea is a species of flowering plant in the family Fabaceae, native to the Indian subcontinent and Myanmar, and widely introduced elsewhere in tropical and subtropical areas of the world. Common names include orchid tree, purple bauhinia, camel's foot, butterfly tree, and Hawaiian orchid tree.

== Description ==
Bauhinia purpurea is a small to medium-size deciduous tree growing to 5.2 metres (17 ft) tall. The leaves are alternate, 10–20 centimetres (4–8 in) long and broad, rounded, and bilobed at the base and apex. The flowers are conspicuous, pink, and fragrant, with five petals. The fruit is a pod measuring 30 cm (12 in) long, containing 12 to 16 seeds. As a diploid species with 28 chromosomes, sequencing of the 304MB B. purpurea genome was used to demonstrate it is the maternal ancestor of the hybrid Hong Kong Bauhinia (Bauhinia x blakeana).

=== Chemistry ===
A wide range of chemical compounds have been isolated from Bauhinia purpurea including 5,6-dihydroxy-7-methoxyflavone 6-O-β-D-xylopyranoside, bis [3',4'-dihydroxy-6-methoxy-7,8-furano-5',6'-mono-methylalloxy]-5-C-5-biflavonyl and (4'-hydroxy-7-methyl 3-C-α-L-rhamnopyranosyl)-5-C-5-(4'-hydroxy-7-methyl-3-C-α-D-glucopyranosyl) bioflavonoid, bibenzyls, dibenzoxepins, mixture of phytol fatty esters, lutein, β-sitosterol, isoquercitin and astragalin.

== Distribution and habitat ==
Native to the Indian subcontinent and Myanmar, the species has been widely introduced elsewhere in tropical and subtropical areas of the world.

In the United States, the tree grows in Hawaii, coastal California, southern Texas, and southwest Florida. Bauhinia × blakeana is usually propagated by grafting it onto B. purpurea stems.

== Uses ==
The young leaves and flowers of Bauhinia purpurea are edible. In the Philippines, B. purpurea is known as alibangbang (lit. "butterfly"). The leaves have a citrusy and sour taste and are used either as a souring agent for sinigang and similar dishes, or, as a pickle condiment, in Philippine cuisine.

Throughout Southeast Asia, B. purpurea and related species are also used in making poultices for treating swelling, bruises, boils, and ulcers. Various parts of the plant are also used in decoctions to treat fever and stomach ailments, as well as being used as an astringent.

In Indian traditional medicine, the leaves are used to treat coughs while the bark is used for glandular diseases and as an antidote for poisons. The flowers are also used in pickles and curries and is regarded as a laxative.

== Gallery ==
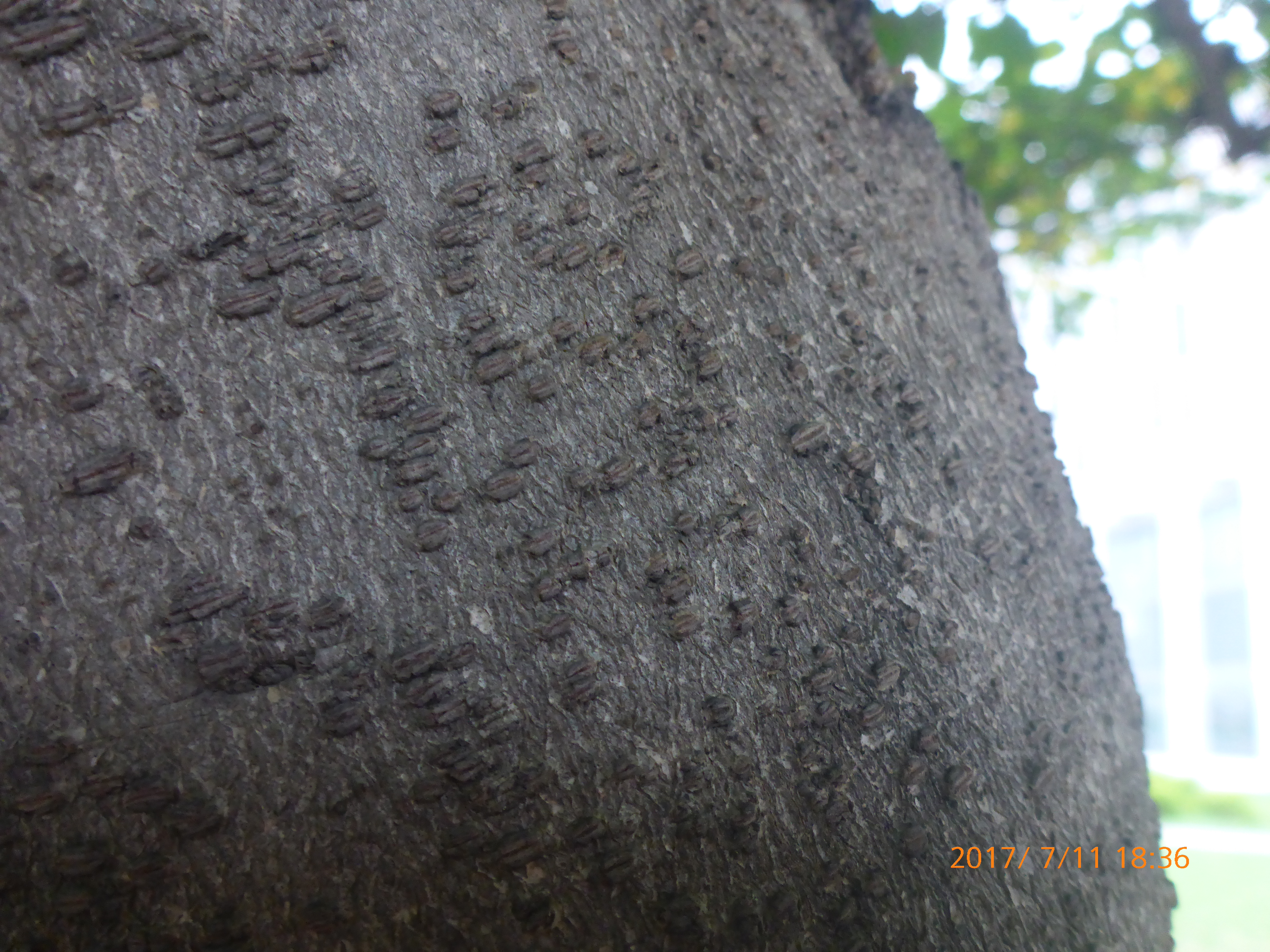
Bark

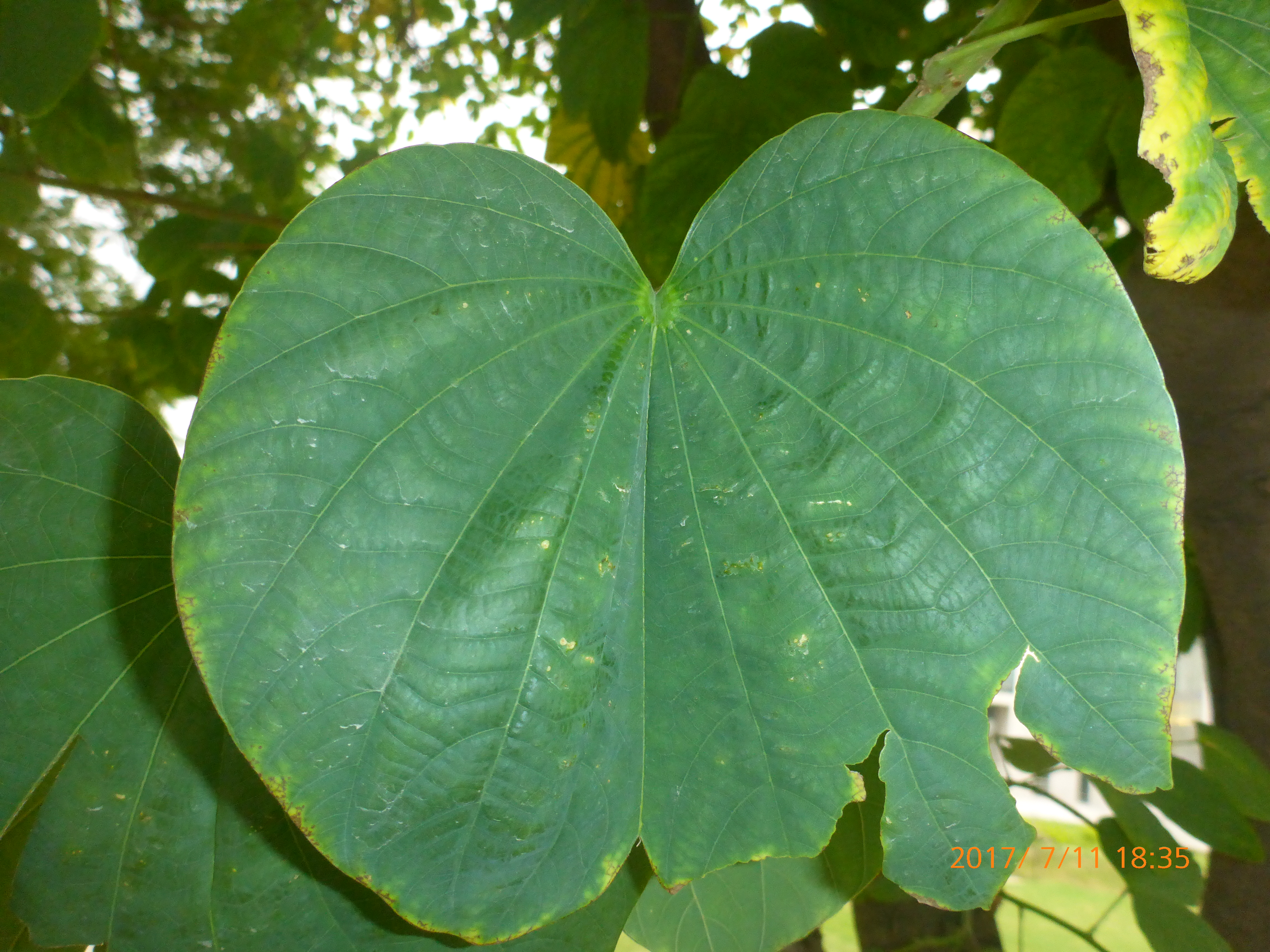
Leaf

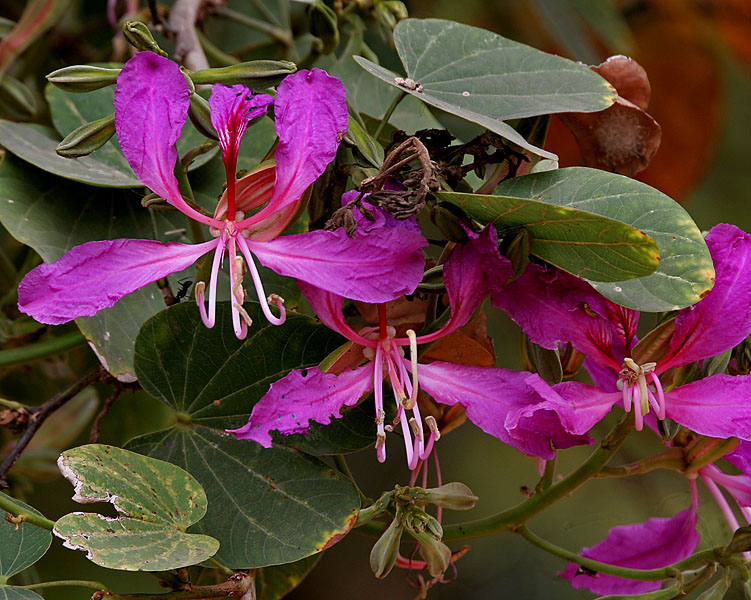
Flowers

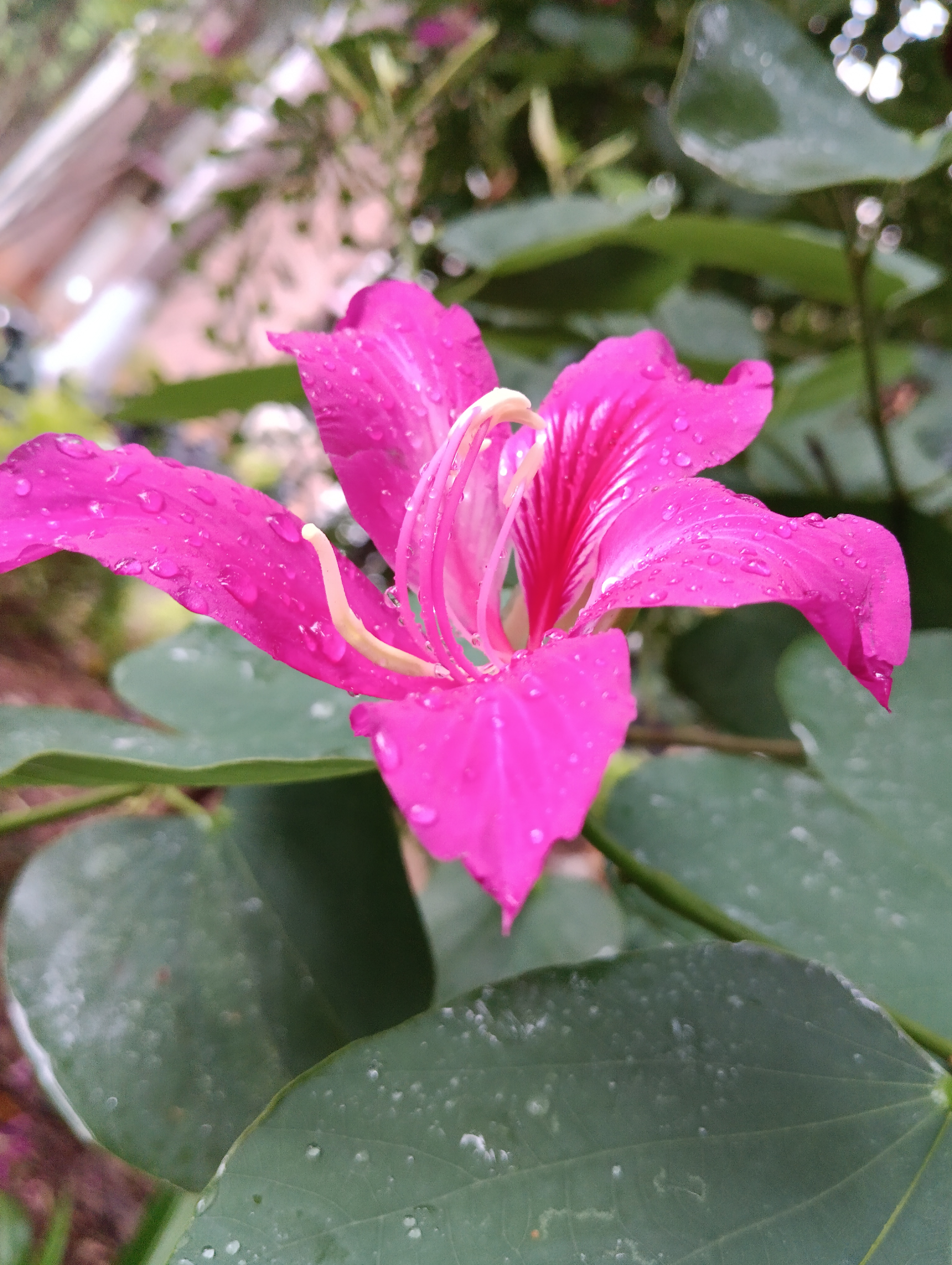
Flower close-up

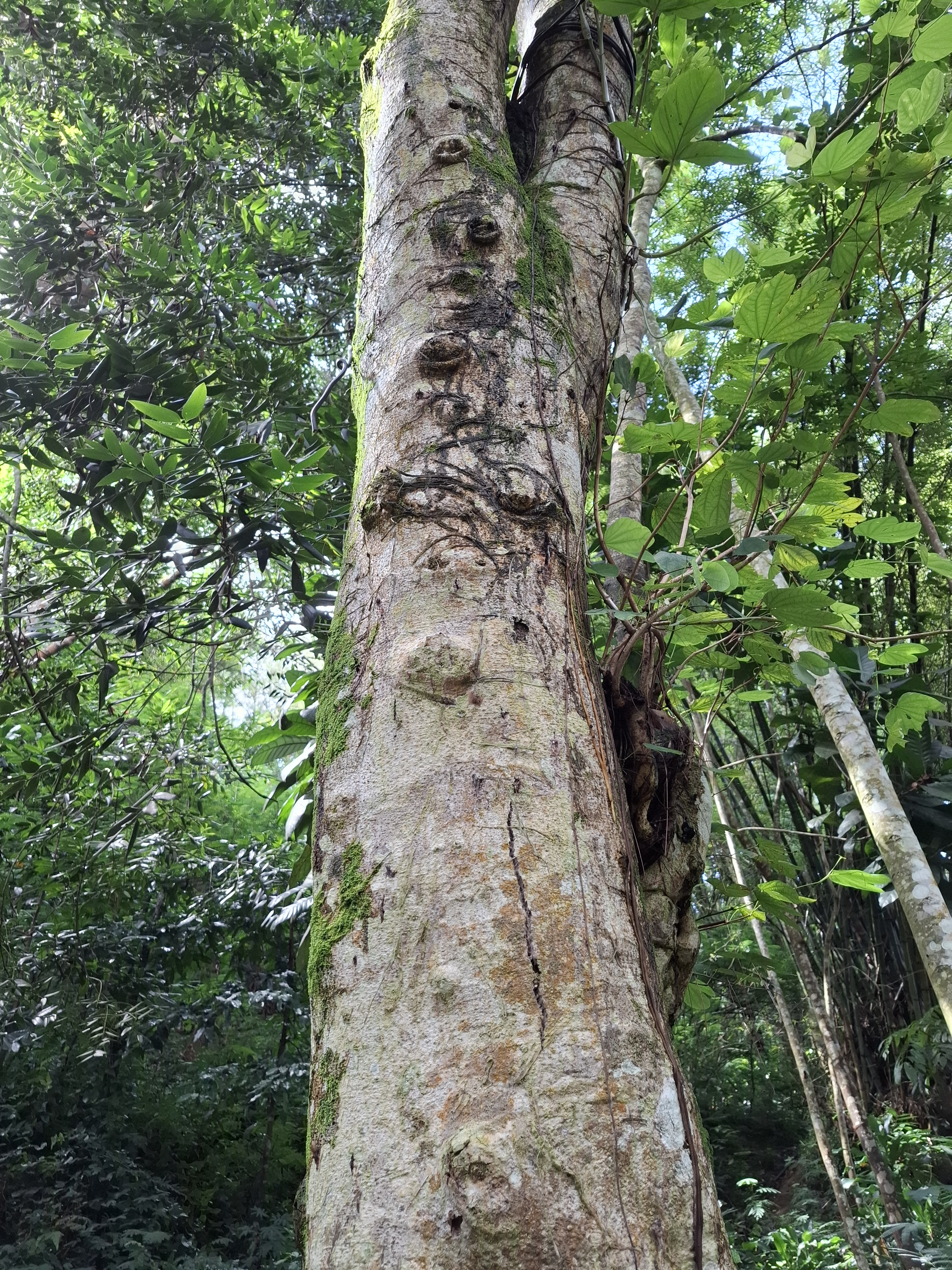
Trunk

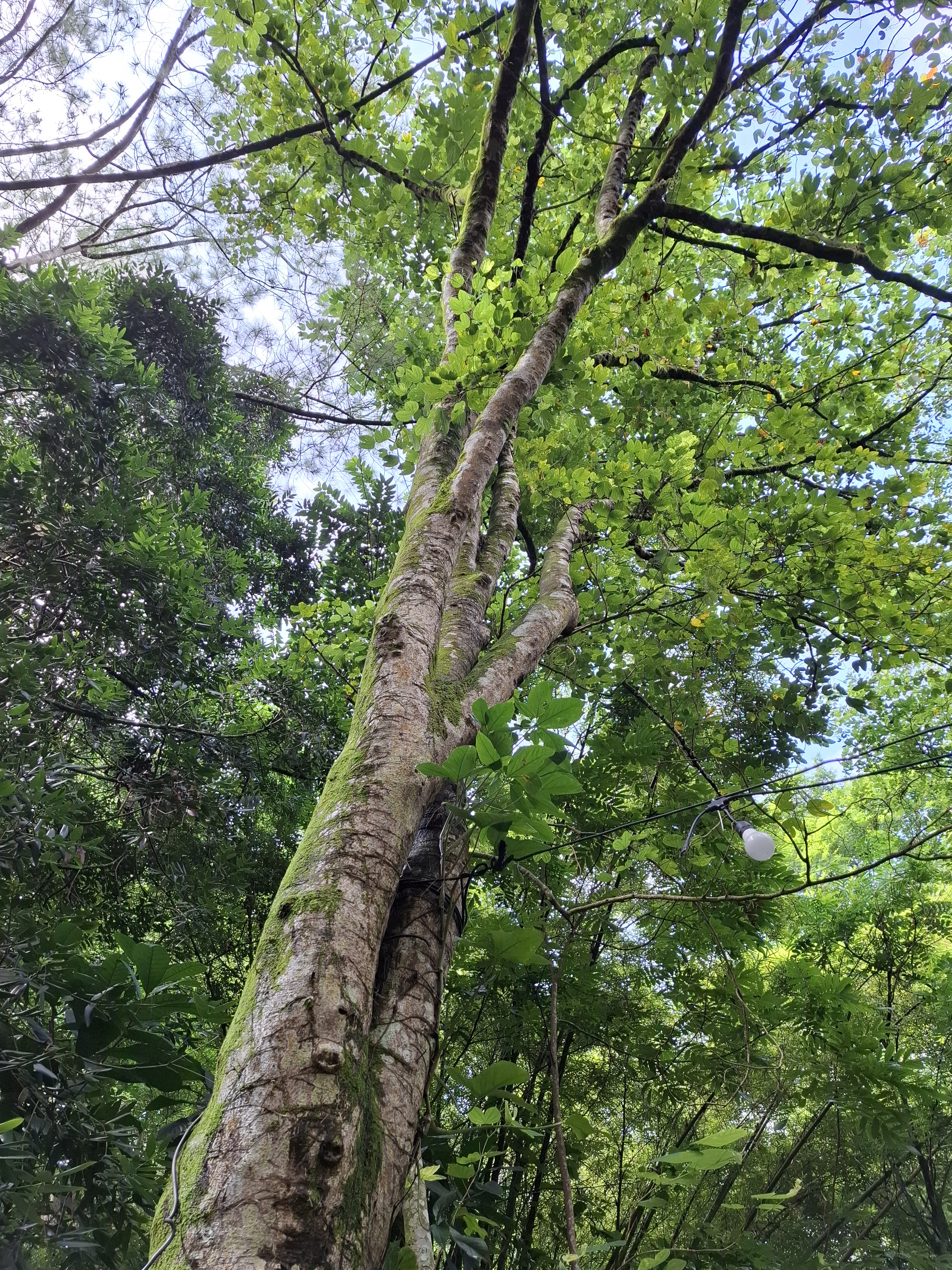
Tree
