= Linarang =

Filipino cuisine

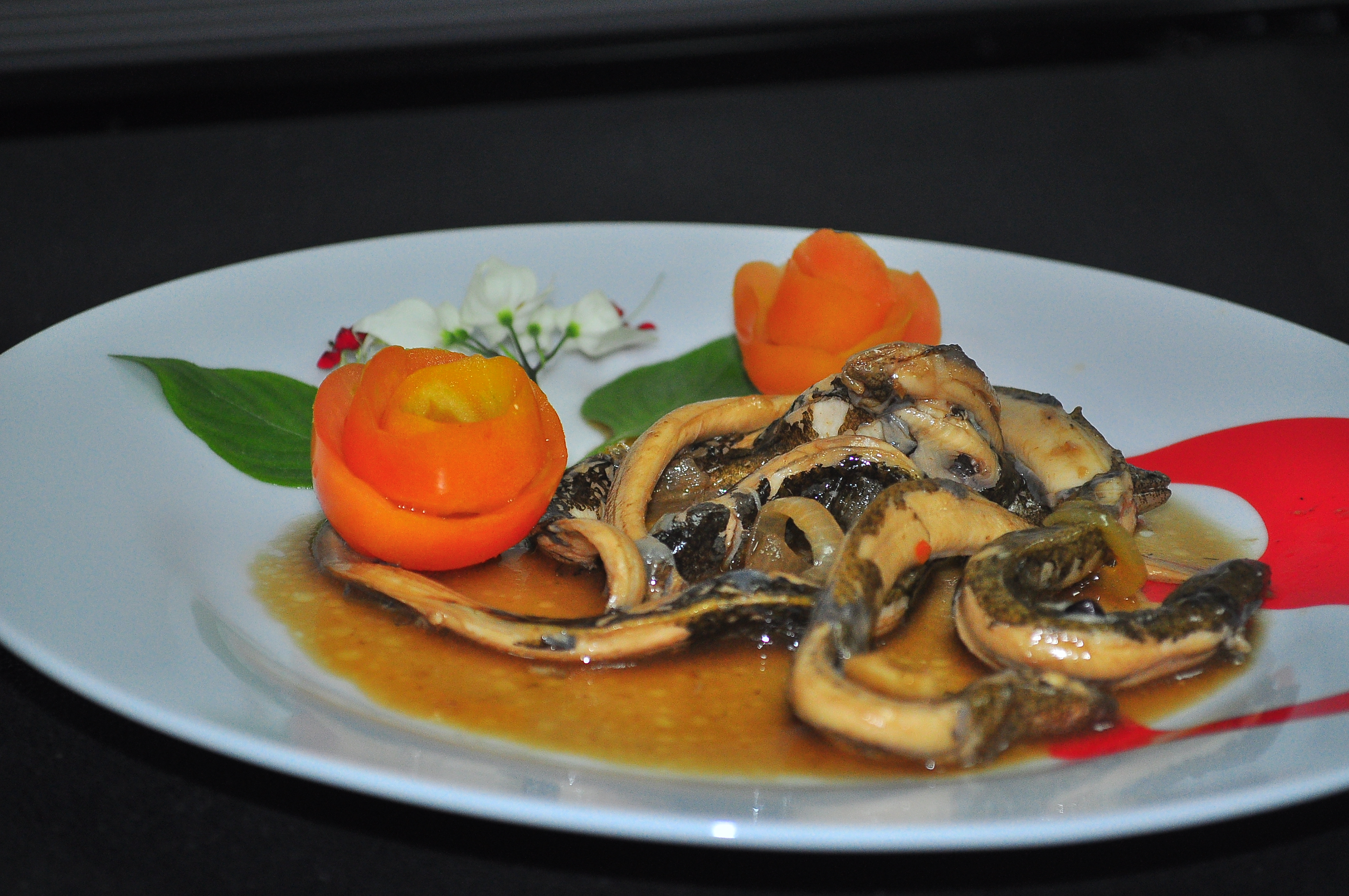
- Linarang na bakasi, made with little morays
- Alternative names: nilarang, larang, gilarang
- Course: Main course
- Place of origin: Philippines
- Region or state: Central Visayas
- Serving temperature: Hot
- Main ingredients: fish, garlic, tomato, red onion, fermented black beans, unripe mangoes or bilimbi, chilis, coconut milk

Linarang, also known as larang or nilarang, is a Filipino fish stew originating from the Central Visayas islands. It is made with fish in a spicy and sour coconut milk-based broth with garlic, red onions, tomatoes, fermented black beans (tausi), chilis, and sour fruits.

== Etymology ==
The name linarang or nilarang (lit. "done as larang"), is the affixed form of the Cebuano verb larang, meaning "to stew with coconut milk and spices". The word is originally a synonym of the ginataan cooking process (ginat-an or tinunoan in Cebuano), but has come to refer exclusively to this particular dish.

== Description ==
Linarang is prepared by first sautéing the fish with garlic, red onions, and tomatoes. It is then added to a broth with fermented black beans (tausi), chilis, and a souring agent. The souring agent is usually bilimbi (iba), unripe mangoes, or tamarind (sambag), but can also be any sour fruit.

== Variations ==
Linarang can vary depending on the type of fish used. The most commonly used are porcupinefish (tagotongan), stingrays (pagi), barracuda (rompe), triggerfish (pakol, pugot, and tikos), marlin (malasugui), cobia or snakehead (tasik), parrotfish (molmol or isda sa bato), and Spanish mackerel (tanguigue).

A notable variant from Cordova, Cebu, is linarang na bakasi or nilarang bakasi, which is made from moray eels (bakasi); specifically the little moray (Gymnothorax richardsonii), which is abundant in the waters around the municipality. The eels are commonly referred to as "baby eels" in English due to their size, even though they are fully-grown adults.

== In popular culture ==
Linarang was featured on the Netflix TV series Street Food in the Cebu, Philippines episode.

== See also ==
- Inun-unan
- Sinampalukan
- Sinigang
- Pinangat na isda
