= Sinampalukan =

Filipino chicken soup dish

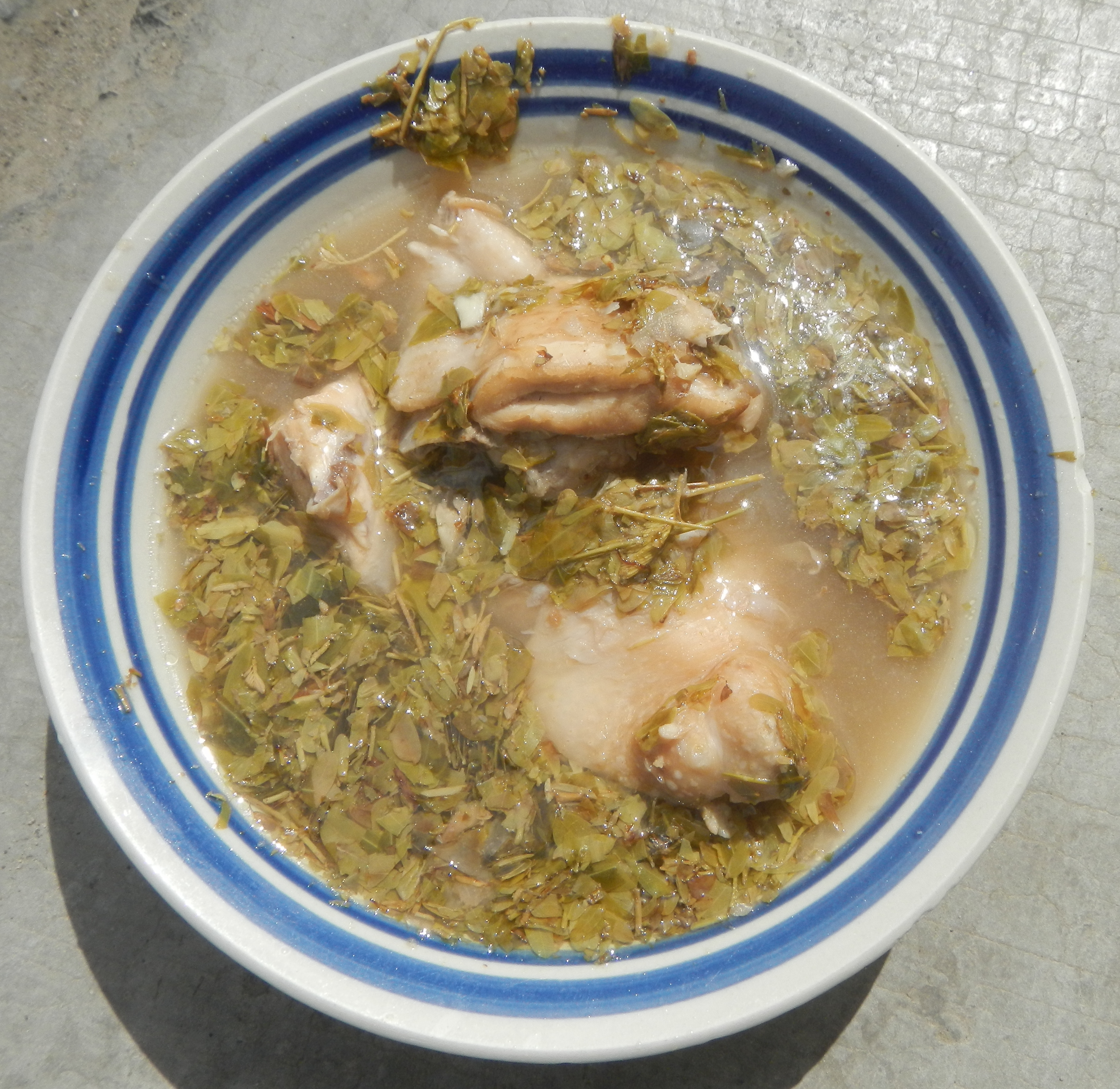
- Sinampalukang manók from Bulacan
- Alternative names: Tamarind chicken, Sinampalukang manók Sinampalokan
- Course: Main dish
- Place of origin: Philippines
- Serving temperature: hot
- Main ingredients: chicken, tamarind, tamarind leaves, ginger, onion, garlic

Sinampalukan, also known as sinampalukang manók or tamarind chicken, is a Filipino chicken soup consisting of chicken cooked in a sour broth with tamarind, tamarind leaves, ginger, onion, garlic, and other vegetables.

== Name ==
The term sinampalukan literally means "[cooked] with tamarind", from Tagalog sampalok, "tamarind".

== Description ==
Sinampalukan is prepared by first sautéing the chicken with garlic, ginger, and onions. Water is then added with tamarind pulp, young tamarind leaves and usually siling haba or labuyo chilis and tomatoes. Other vegetables can also be added if desired, including green beans, pechay, cabbage, eggplant, and others. It is served over white rice. Sinampalukan is regarded as a comfort food, usually served to sick people or during cold days.

Sinampalukan is very similar to sinigang and is sometimes regarded as a mere variant of the latter. However, sinampalukan differs most obviously in that it uses tamarind leaves as one of the main ingredients. It is also restricted to tamarind as the souring agent, unlike sinigang which can also use a variety of other sour fruits.

== See also ==
- Linarang
