= Paksiw =

Filipino cooking process

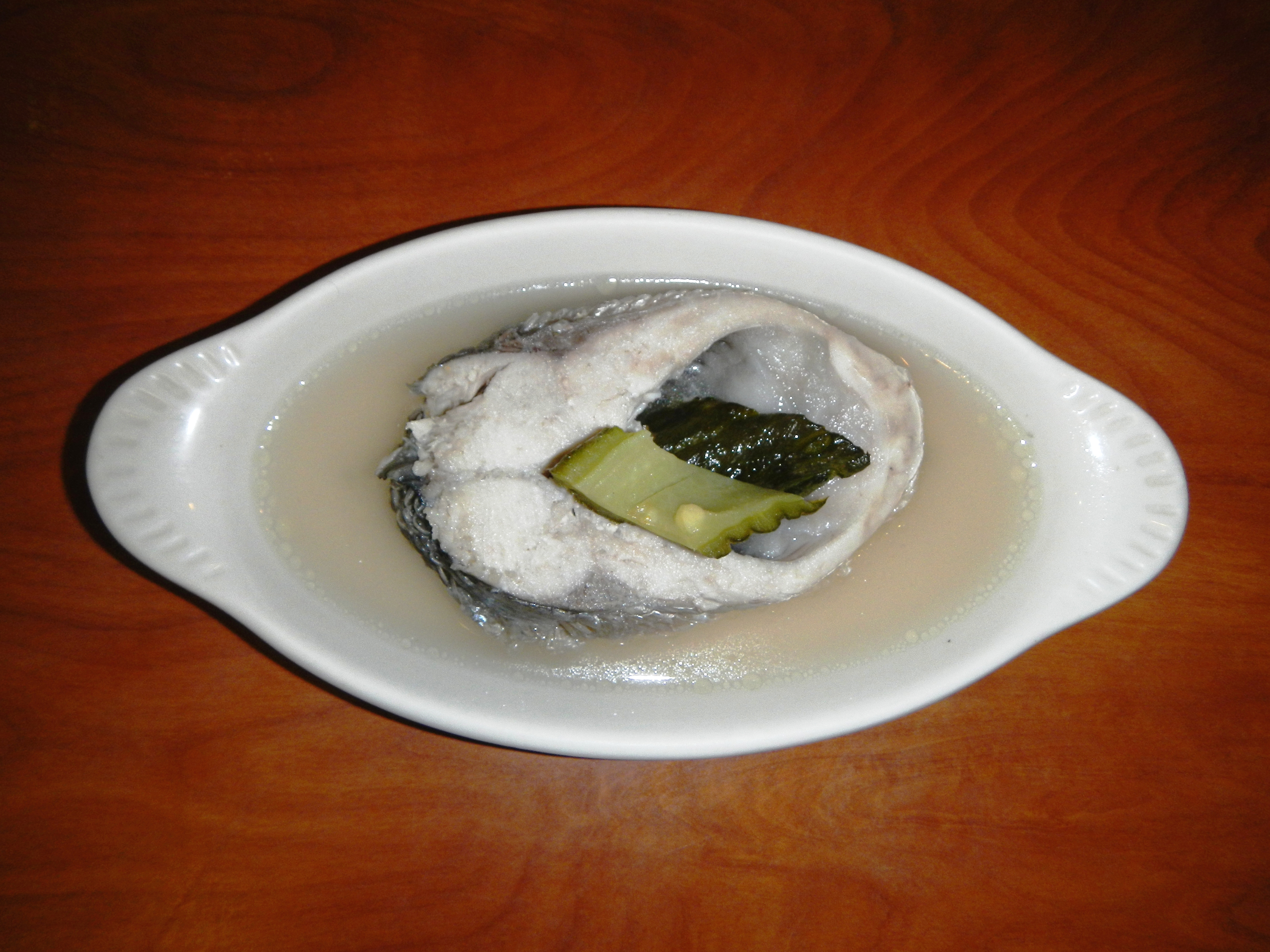
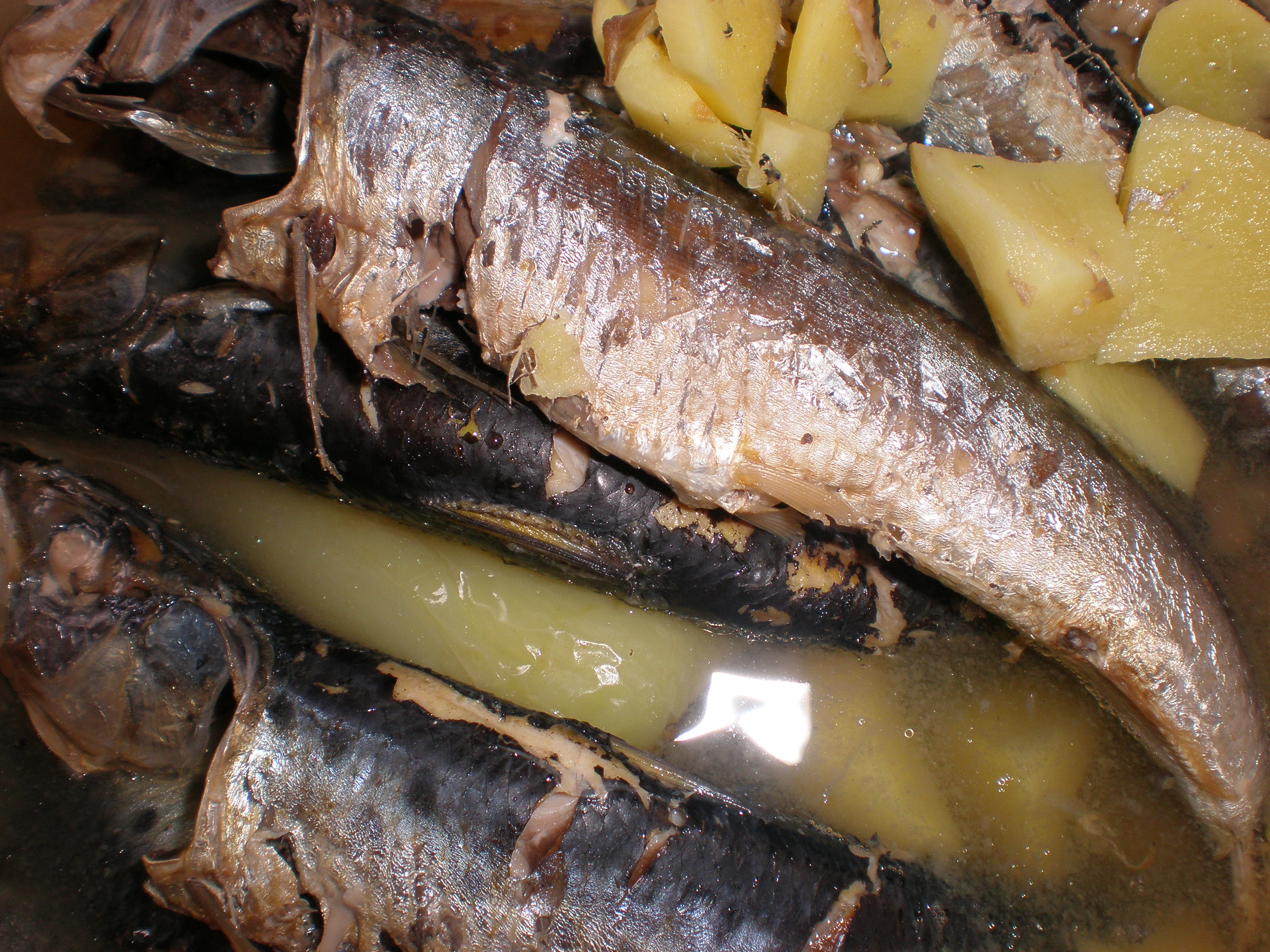
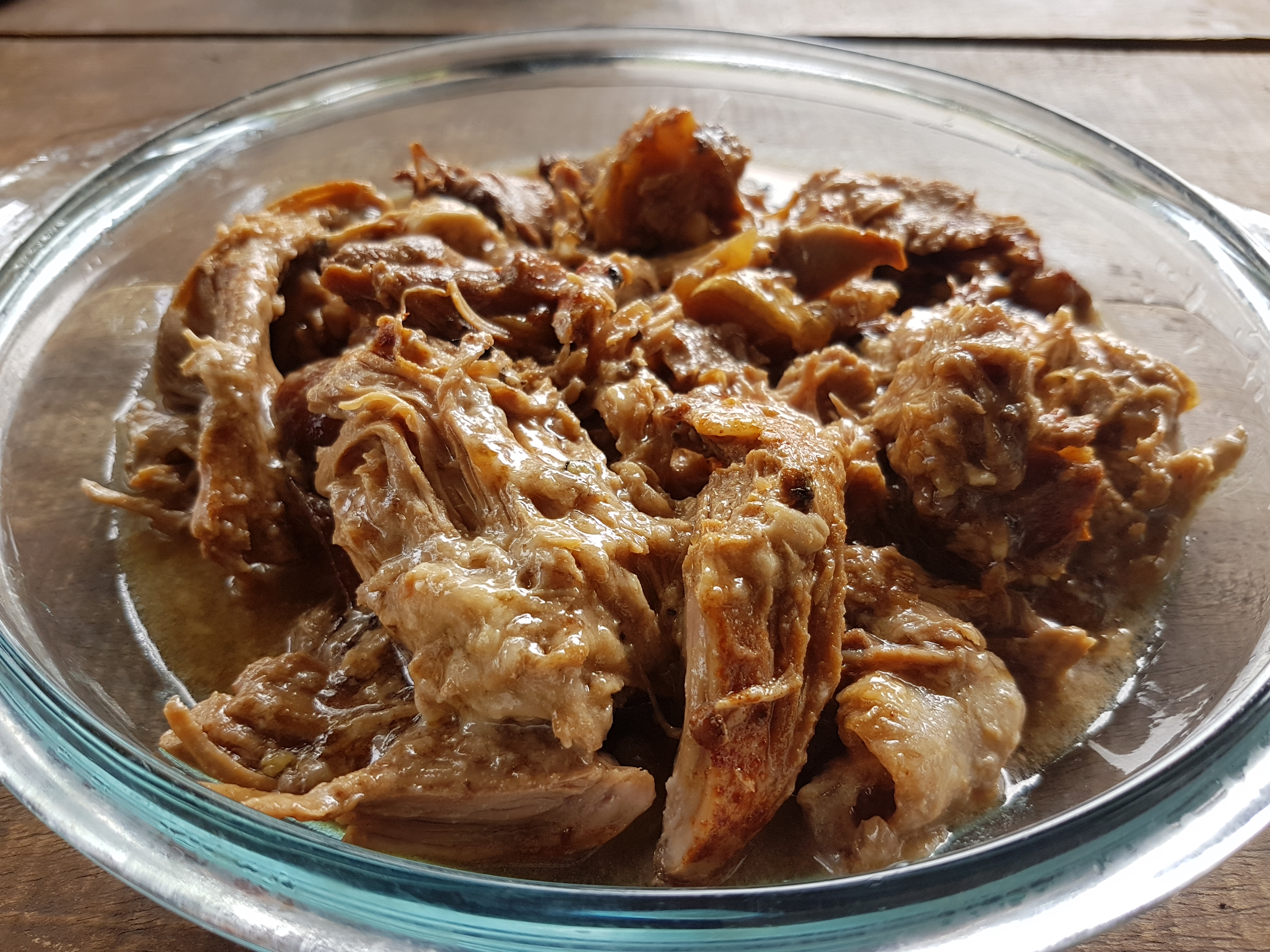
- Top: A serving of paksiw na isda; Middle: Inun-unan, a Visayan paksiw which does not include vegetables and is primarily spiced with ginger; Bottom: Visayan-style lechon paksiw from Northern Mindanao
- Course: Main course
- Place of origin: Philippines
- Serving temperature: Hot
- Main ingredients: Vinegar, fish sauce and spiced with siling mahaba
- Similar dishes: Philippine adobo, kinilaw

Paksiw (Tagalog: [pɐk.ˈsɪʊ̯]) is a Filipino style of cooking, whose name means "to cook and simmer in vinegar". Common dishes bearing the term, however, can vary substantially depending on what is being cooked.

Pinangat na isda may sometimes also be referred to as paksiw, though it is a different but related dish that uses sour fruits like calamansi, kamias (bilimbi) or sampalok (tamarind) to sour the broth rather than vinegar.

== Types ==
Paksiw refers to a wide range of very different dishes that are cooked in a vinegar broth. They include the following:

=== Ilocano Paksiw ===
Unlike other regional variations of paksiw, the Ilocano version commonly uses fish, meat offals, and vegetables, or mixture of these ingredients stewed in vinegar, trypically using sukang-Iloko (sugarcane vinegar) ginger, onion or shallots, garlic, oil, and bugguóng (fermented fish sauce). Vegetables are also commonly prepared as paksiw in Ilocano cuisine, typical vegetables used include okra, saluyot, eggplant, bitter melon, taro, and green chillies which may also be cooked individually. Fish-based versions may use bangus, mackerel, tilapia, anchovies, and other fish, while meat-based may use offals such as intestines, liver, tongue, and kidney.

Tinimtim, also known as paksiw nga saluyot, is a paksiw made from jute mallow leaves stewed in sukang-Iloko and seasoned with garlic and bugguóng , and is optionally prepared with dried shrimp locally known as kuros.

Paksiw nga Ipon, made from small freshwater fish or fry stewed in sukang-Iloko, typically seasoned with ginger and garlic, and wrapped in banana leaves.

Paksiw nga Aruy-uy, is a variation made with aruy-uy or siling duwag (mild green chillies with little or no pungency), seasoned with sukang-Iloko, garlic and bugguóng.

=== Ginataang paksiw na isda ===
A common variant of ginataang isda (fish in coconut milk) that adds vinegar to sour the broth. This variant combines the ginataan and paksiw methods of cooking in Filipino cuisine.

=== Inun-unan ===
Inun-unan or inun-onan is a notable Visayan version of the fish paksiw dish spiced primarily with ginger, as well as onions, shallots, pepper, salt, and sometimes siling haba chilis. Unlike northern paksiw na isda, it does not include vegetables and very little or no water is added to the broth. It is sometimes anglicized as "boiled pickled fish". The name comes from the Visayan verb un-un or un-on, meaning to "stew with vinegar, salt, and spices."

=== Paksiw na baboy ===
Paksiw na baboy, which is pork, usually hock or shank (paksiw na pata for pig's trotters), cooked in ingredients similar to those in adobo but with the addition of sugar and banana blossoms (or pineapples) to make it sweeter and water to keep the meat moist and to yield a rich sauce.

=== Paksiw na dilis ===
A unique variant of fish paksiw made with anchovies (known as dilis in Tagalog and bolinaw in Visayan languages) that is then wrapped in a banana leaf. It is also known as inun-unan na bolinaw or pinais na bolinaw in Visayan-speaking regions.

=== Paksiw na isda ===
Paksiw na isda is fish poached in a vinegar broth usually seasoned with fish sauce and spiced with siling mahaba. It also usually includes vegetables, commonly eggplant and ampalaya (bitter melon).

=== Paksiw na lechon ===
Paksiw na lechon is leftover spit-roasted pork (lechon) meat that is cooked with vinegar, garlic, onions, black pepper, and some water. The Luzon version adds ground liver or liver spread ("lechon sauce"), while the Visayan versions do not.

== See also ==
- Philippine adobo, another Philippine cooking method that uses vinegar
- Linarang
- Dinuguan
- Cuisine of the Philippines
