= Hot and sour noodles =

Chinese noodle dish

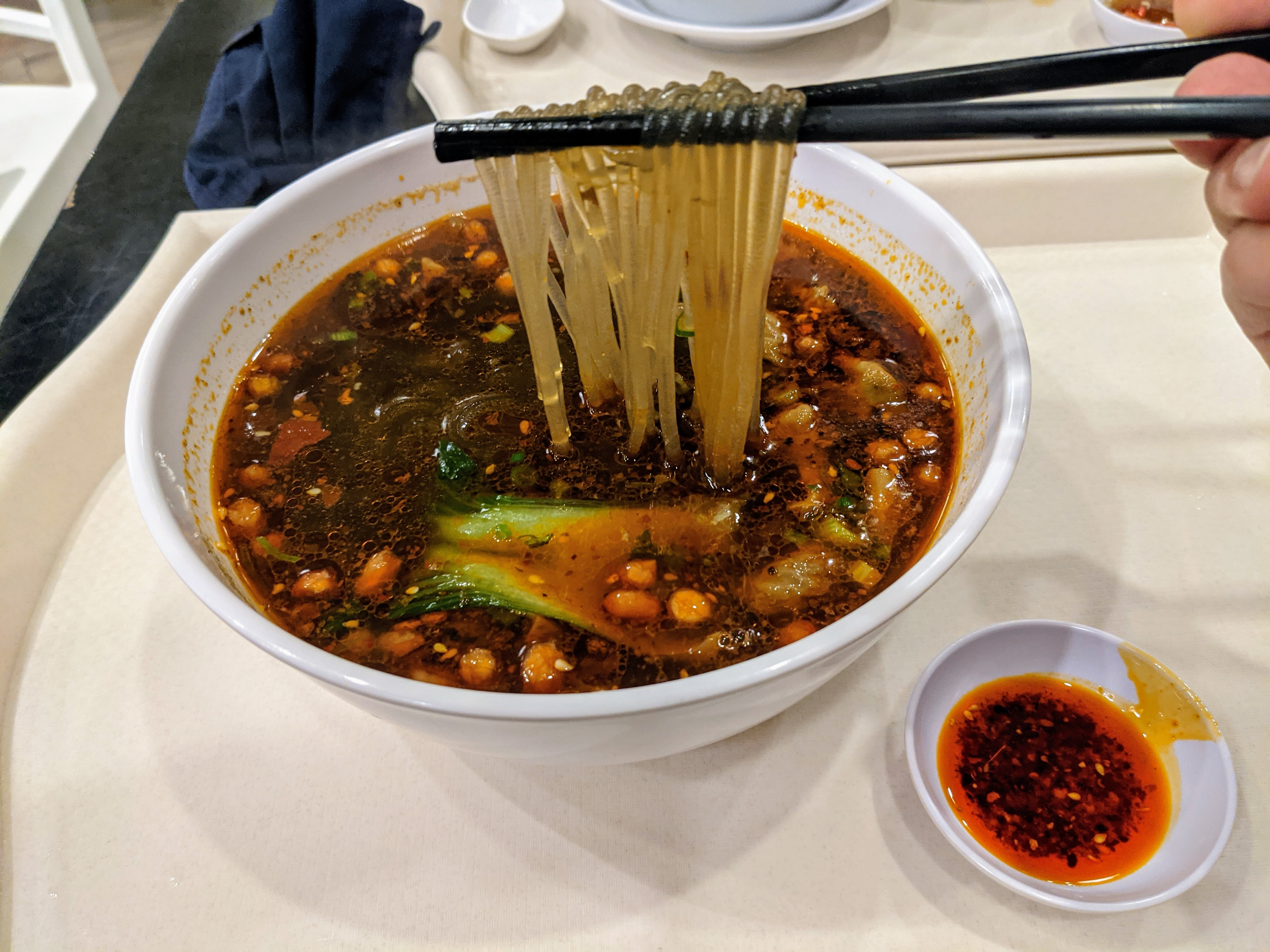
- A bowl of Chengdu-style hot and sour noodles with sweet potato noodles and pork intestines
- Place of origin: China
- Region or state: Sichuan

Hot and sour noodles (Chinese: 酸辣粉; pinyin: suānlàfěn) is a dish which comes from Sichuan, China and is a popular part of Sichuan cuisine. The noodles are made from starch derived from peas, potato, sweet potato, or rice.

== History ==
It is unclear when and who invented the dish, which had been very popular in at least the Qing dynasty, and was initially mostly served as street food in Sichuan.

== Characteristics ==
Its unique flavor combines the sourness from Chinese rice vinegar with the spiciness from chili pepper oil. Ground toasted peanuts and soybeans on top of the noodles add crispness. Besides rice vinegar, chili oil and peanuts/soybeans, other ingredients include sugar, salt, soy sauce, scallion pieces, and smashed garlic.

The noodles used vary widely from thin vermicelli to belt-like kuanfen up to 5 cm wide.

== Ingredients ==
The sauce is typically made up of chinkiang vinegar, chili oil, light soy sauce, sichuan peppercorns, and chili flakes. The broth is usually made from stock, and chili oil. Suan la fen is often topped with zha cai, fried peanuts or soybeans, sliced scallions, and cilantro.

== Preparation ==
The preparation for hot and sour noodles is relatively easy and quick. For street vendors in Sichuan, it only takes 2–3 minutes to serve the noodles after taking customers' orders. Noodles are simmered in boiling water, and then added to a bowl in which rice vinegar, soy sauce, salt, sugar and chili oil have been placed. The dish is garnished with peanuts or soybeans and scallion pieces on top of the noodles.

== See also ==
- Hot and sour soup
