= Siling haba =

Cultivar of Capsicum annuum

Long chili siling haba (Tagalog) espada (Spanish)
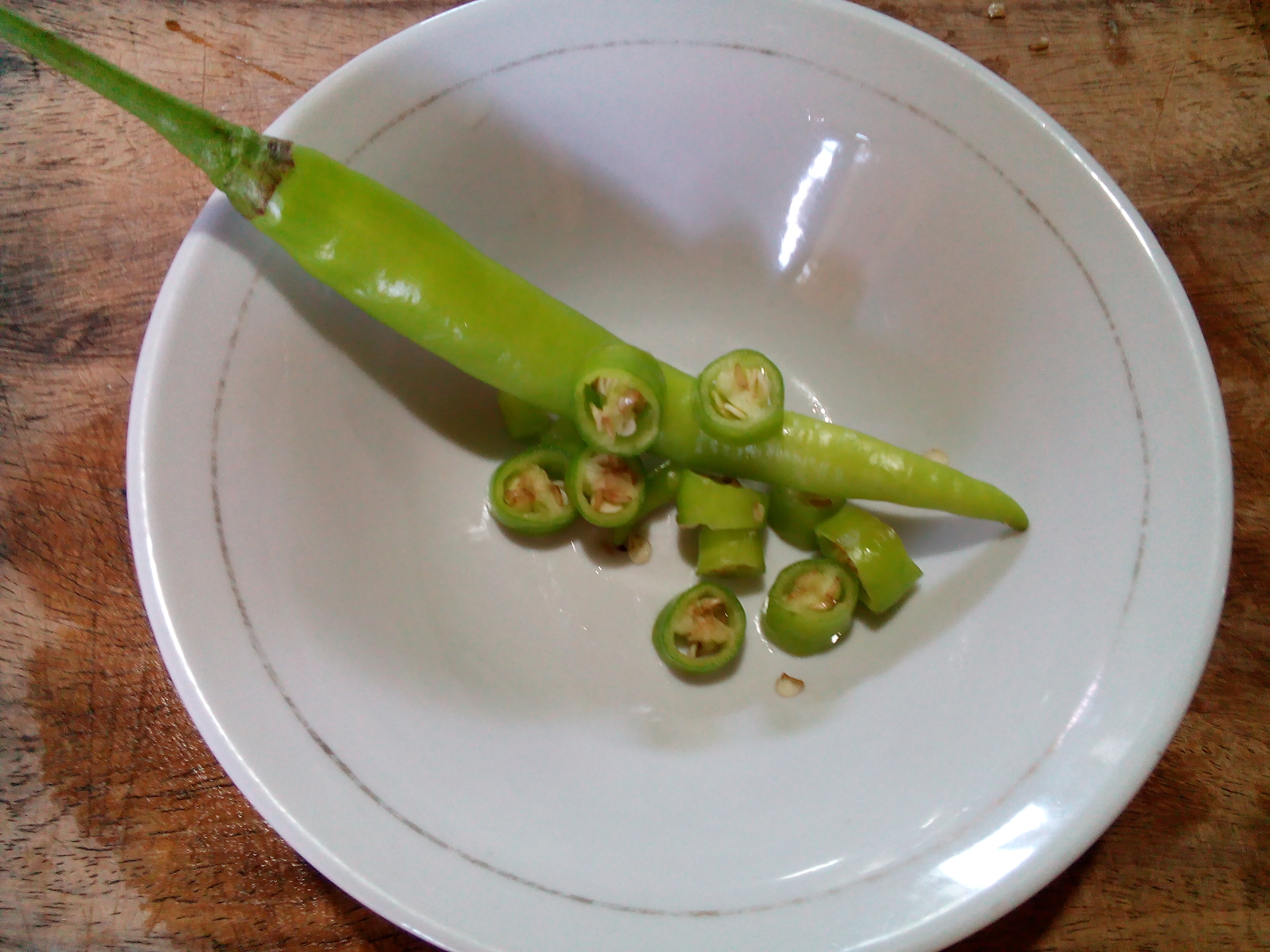
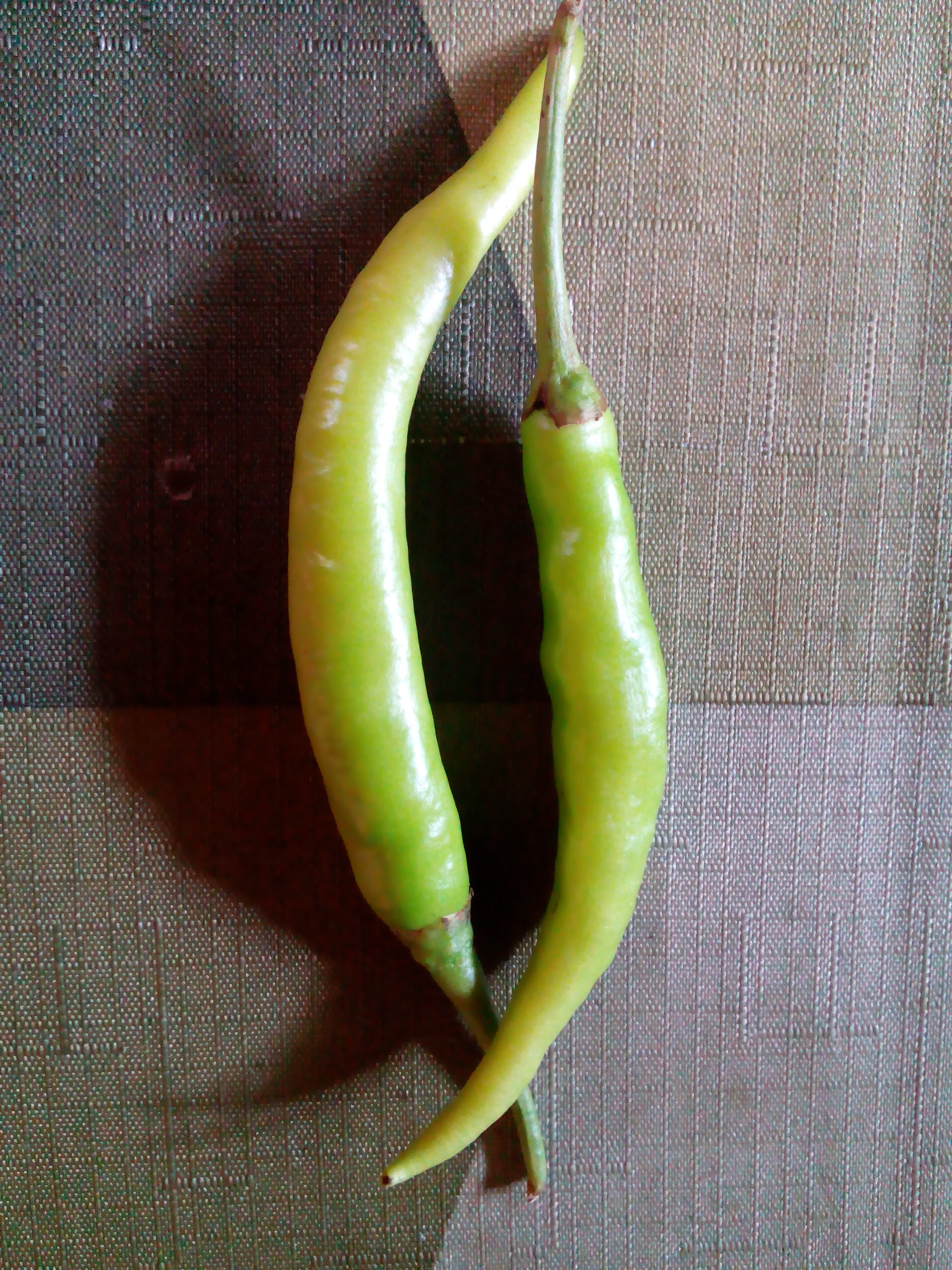
- 'Siling haba' pepper
- Genus: Capsicum
- Species: Capsicum annuum
- Cultivar: 'Siling haba'
- Heat: Hot
- Scoville scale: 50,000 SHU

Siling haba ("long chili"), espada ("sword" in Spanish), siling mahaba, siling pangsigang ("chili for sinigang"), siling Tagalog ("Tagalog chili"), and sometimes called green chili, finger chili or long pepper, is one of two kinds of chili common to the Philippines and Filipino cuisine, the other being siling labuyo. Unlike siling labuyo, it belongs to the species Capsicum annuum.

The siling haba fruit grows to between 5 and 7 in (13 and 18 cm) long, and is bright light green in color. While of moderate spiciness, it is much milder and less hot than siling labuyo. It is an ingredient commonly used in Philippine cuisine, in dishes like sinigang, dinuguan, pinangat, kilawin, paksiw, and sisig.
