= Miguel Cabel Moreno =

Filipino chef and advocate (born 1986)

- Born: Miguel Cabel Moreno; August 12, 1986
- Education: Ateneo de Zamboanga University (BS Nursing)
- Occupations: Chef; restaurateur; author
- Spouse: Nelson Canlas

Miguel Cabel Moreno is a Filipino chef, restaurateur, and cultural advocate known for championing the cuisine of his native Tausug heritage and the Zambasulta (Zamboanga, Basilan, Sulu, and Tawi-Tawi) Region of Southern Mindanao. He is the founder of Palm Grill, a restaurant in Luzon specializing in Southern Mindanaoan cuisine, and co-founder of Cabel Filipino Heritage Restaurant.

Moreno's work includes children's literature and media appearances, aimed at preserving heirloom recipes and challenging negative stereotypes associated with his home region.

== Early life and education ==
Moreno was born in Jolo, Sulu, and raised in Zamboanga City. His culinary knowledge was passed down through his family, particularly from his mother, Melissa Cabel, and grandmother, Oswalda Alcantara-Cabel. He learned to cook through observation and practice, absorbing traditional methods by "feel" rather than by following formal recipes.

He graduated from Ateneo de Zamboanga University with a degree in nursing. Following his studies, he worked as a nurse for two years before deciding to pursue a career in the culinary arts.

== Career ==
During his college years, Moreno rented a booth at the annual "Ateneo Fiesta" to sell his mother's Piyanggang manok, a Tausug dish of chicken cooked with burnt coconut. The consistent success of this venture solidified his ambition to open his own restaurant.

In May 2017, Moreno opened Palm Grill in Tomas Morato, Quezon City. It was the first restaurant in Luzon to focus exclusively on the cuisine of Southern Mindanao. Moreno stated his goal was to address the "erasure" of his culture's food from the capital's culinary landscape and to "reclaim" its narrative. The restaurant's signature dishes include Tiyula Itum (a black beef soup traditionally served to Tausug royalty) and Piyanggang Manok.

In 2025, Palm Grill was featured on the YouTube series Best Ever Food Review Show. Host Sonny Side awarded the Tiyula Itum a 5-star rating, calling it "one of the best foods I've ever had in the Philippines." The restaurant's second branch, Palm Grill Araneta, opened in October 2023 at the Palenque food hall of Gateway Mall 2 in Araneta City, Cubao.

In late 2022, Moreno, along with his brother JC "King" Cabel Moreno and sister Maria Isabel, opened Cabel Filipino Heritage Restaurant. The restaurant is located in the historic Casa Roces, a restored 1930s ancestral home adjacent to Malacañang Palace in Manila.

Cabel's menu is pan-Philippine, featuring heirloom recipes from Luzon, Visayas, and Mindanao. By placing Tausug dishes like Tiyula Itum alongside national staples such as Adobo and Kare-kare, the restaurant aims to integrate Southern Mindanaoan cuisine into the broader Filipino culinary canon. The establishment also incorporates an art gallery and a speakeasy, functioning as a cultural hub.

== Advocacy and other ventures ==
Moreno has co-authored two children's books with his husband, GMA broadcast journalist Nelson Canlas, and his sister, Maria Isabel Moreno-Go. The books are intended to introduce Tausug culture, traditions, and food to young readers.

- Si Migoy, Ang Batang Tausug is inspired by Moreno's childhood.
- Ang Kwento ni Putli Mandi is a follow-up story about a traditional chewy coconut treat.

Moreno was a featured culinary voice representing Mindanao in I Love Filipino, Netflix's first food documentary series on the Philippines. He has also appeared on the Best Ever Food Review Show on YouTube.

== Awards and recognition ==
Moreno received the Datu ng Kusinang Kultural award at the Maharlikang Filipino 2025 for his contributions to the preservation and promotion of Filipino cuisine.

In March 2024, Moreno was honored with Malaya Business Insight’s Creative Culinary Excellence Award at the annual Living Laurels Awards Night.

== Personal life ==
Moreno's mother, Melissa Cabel, was a single parent and entrepreneur who also ran several food businesses, which Moreno cites as a key inspiration. His brother, JC "King" Cabel Moreno, left a 12-year corporate career to co-manage the family's restaurants. Moreno is married to GMA broadcast journalist Nelson Canlas.
