= Palm Grill =

Mindanaoan cuisine restaurant

- Interactive map of Palm Grill

Restaurant information
- Established: 2017
- Head chef: Miguel Cabel Moreno
- Food type: Cuisine of Zamboanga Peninsula, Basilan and Tawi-Tawi
- Rating: Bib Gourmand (Michelin Guide)
- Location: 179 Tomas Morato Avenue, Quezon City, Philippines
- Coordinates: 14°37′45.604″N 121°2′2.21″E
- Other locations: Palenque (Filipino food alley) at Gateway Mall Quezon City

Palm Grill is a restaurant in Quezon City that serves cuisine originating from the Zambasulta (Zamboanga/Basilan/Sulu/Tawi-tawi) part of the Philippines. Run by Tausug chef Miguel Cabel Moreno, it opened in 2017 and received a Bib Gourmand designation in the inaugural Michelin Guide awards in the Philippines in 2025. In an interview with ABS-CBN, Moreno stated that the award from Michelin is "a win for the Tausug people," adding that he is "big on representation", seeing his restaurant as having the task of showcasing the best of Mindanaoan cuisine.

According to Moreno, Palm Grill has a commissary in Zamboanga who produces all the ingredients for the restaurant, the raw source of which come from farmers in the peninsula as well as in Sulu and Tawi-tawi.

== Food ==
The restaurant's tiyula Itum and piyanggang manok have been particularly noted, as well as its dulang (banquet platter). Spot.ph has also praised the restaurant's chicken dishes, some of which are recipes from Moreno's clan.

Dessert at the restaurant feature Moreno's durian ice cream and Palm Grill's version of the lokot-lokot among the choices.

== Branches ==
Palm Grill has no branch, but has put up a stall at Gateway Mall Quezon City's Palenque, which is a Filipino food-themed alley curated by chef Claude Tayag.
