= Chicken curry =

Curry with chicken

- Type: Curry
- Region or state: Indian subcontinent, Southeast Asia, Southern Africa, British Isles and Caribbean
- Main ingredients: Chicken, onions, ginger, garlic, chili peppers, spices (turmeric, cumin, coriander, garam masala)

Chicken curry or curry/curried chicken is an Indian dish originating from South Asia. It is common in the cuisine of the Indian subcontinent, Caribbean, Southeast Asia, Great Britain, and South Africa. A typical curry from the Indian subcontinent consists of chicken stewed in an onion- and tomato-based sauce, flavoured with ginger, garlic, tomato puree, chilli peppers and a variety of spices, often including turmeric, cumin, coriander, cinnamon, and cardamom. Outside of South Asia, chicken curry is often made with a pre-made spice mixture known as curry powder.

== Regional variations ==
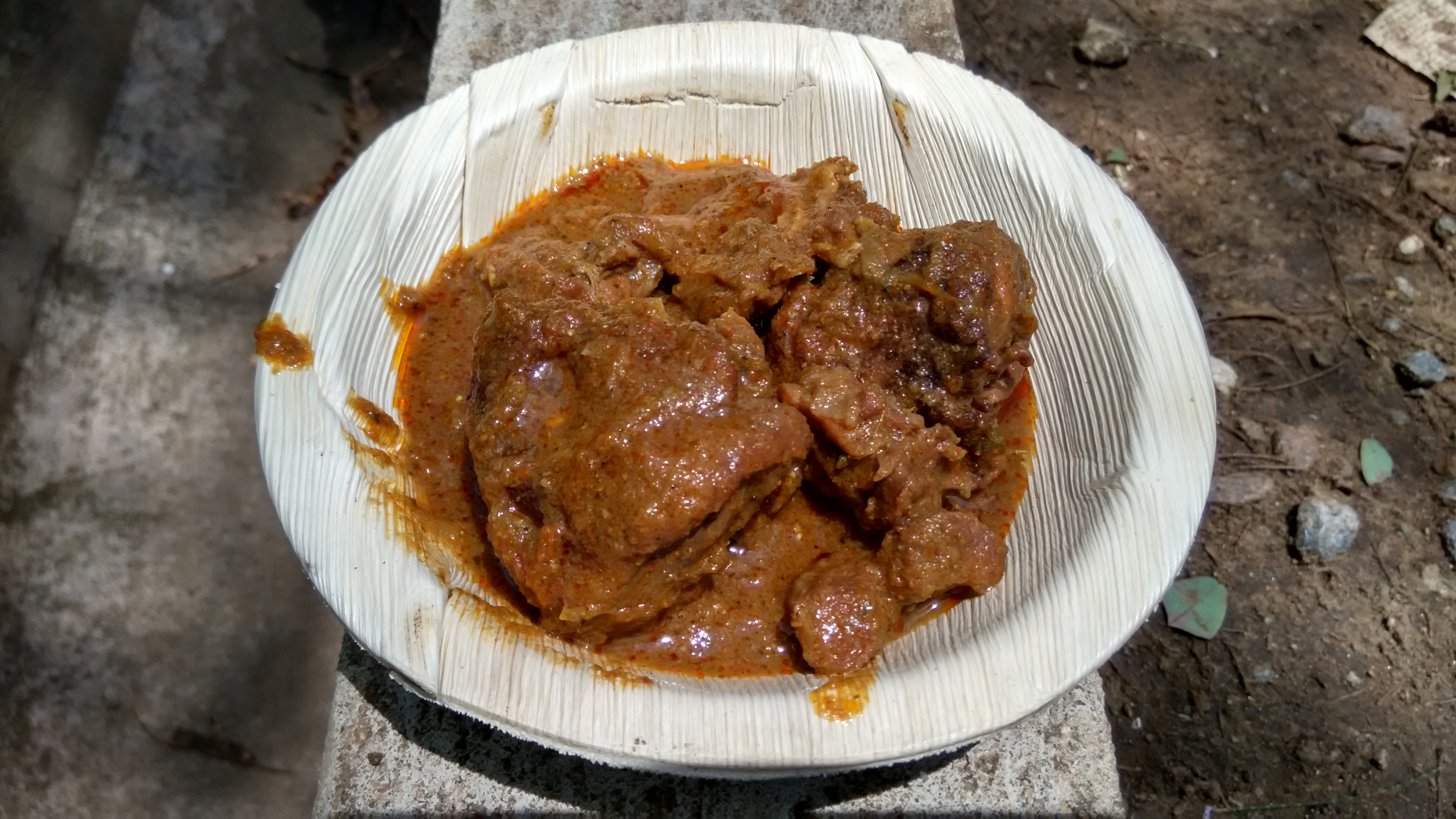
Chicken curry of Tamil Nadu, India

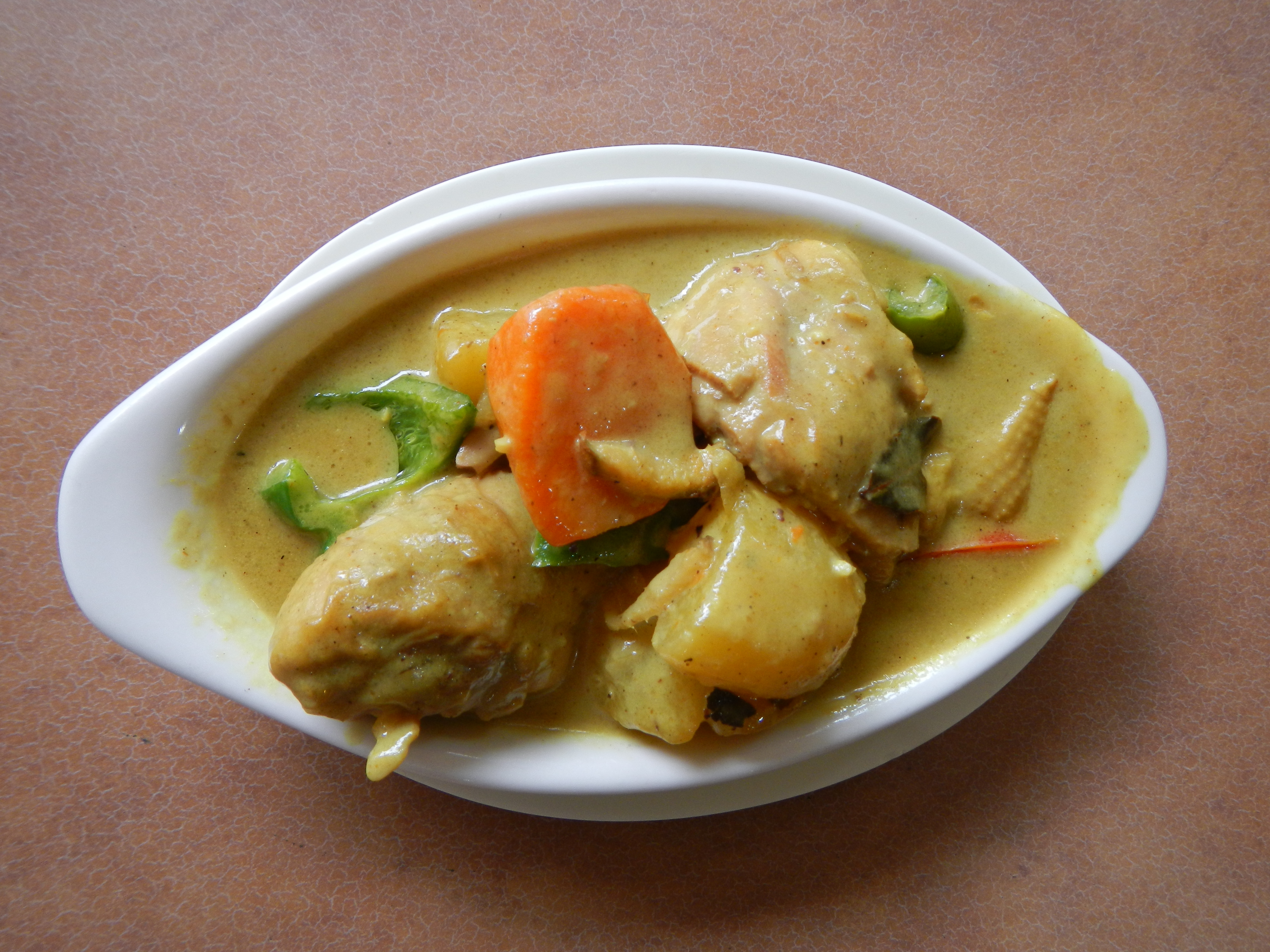
Filipino chicken curry from Baliuag, Bulacan

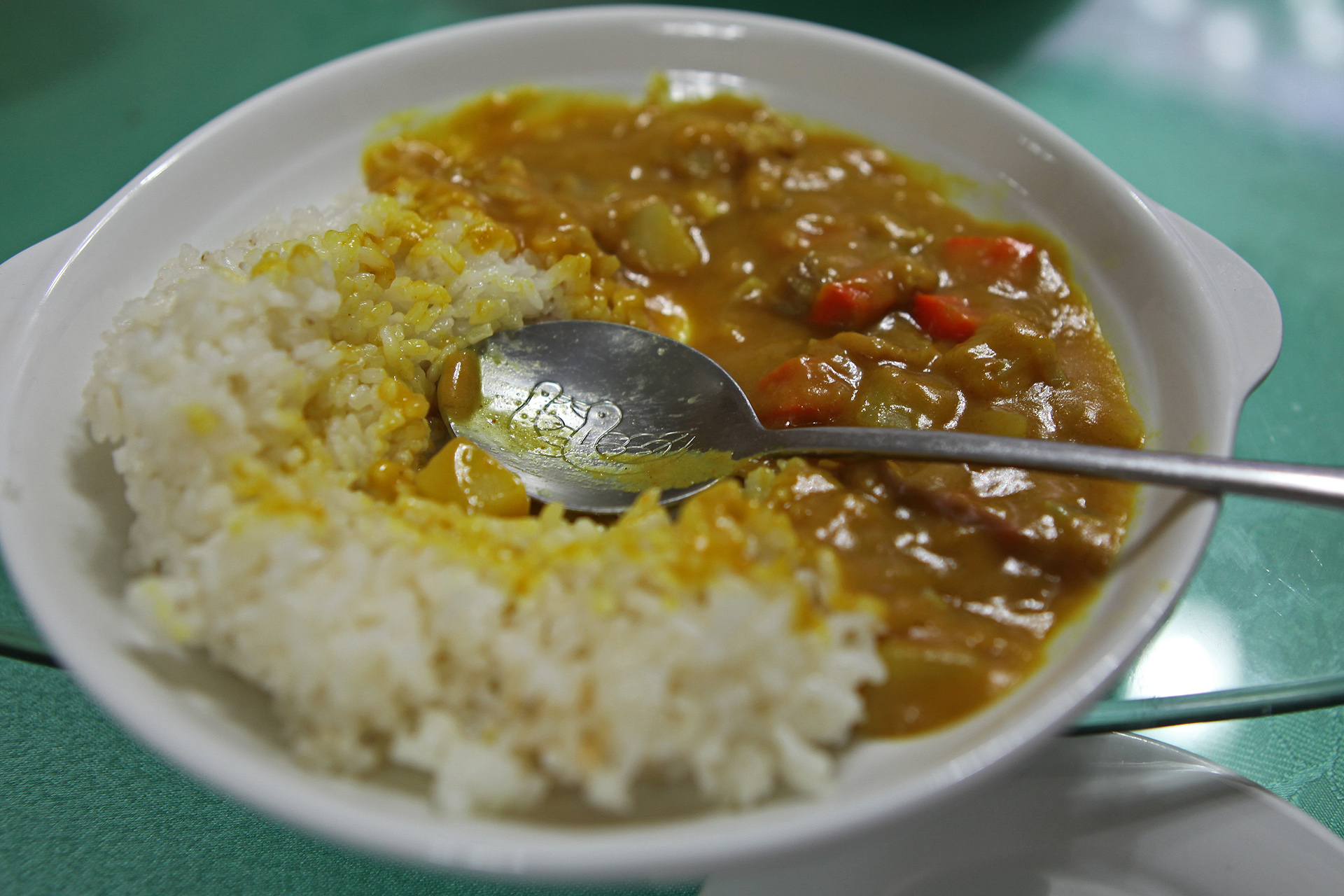
Chicken curry with rice from Rason, North Korea

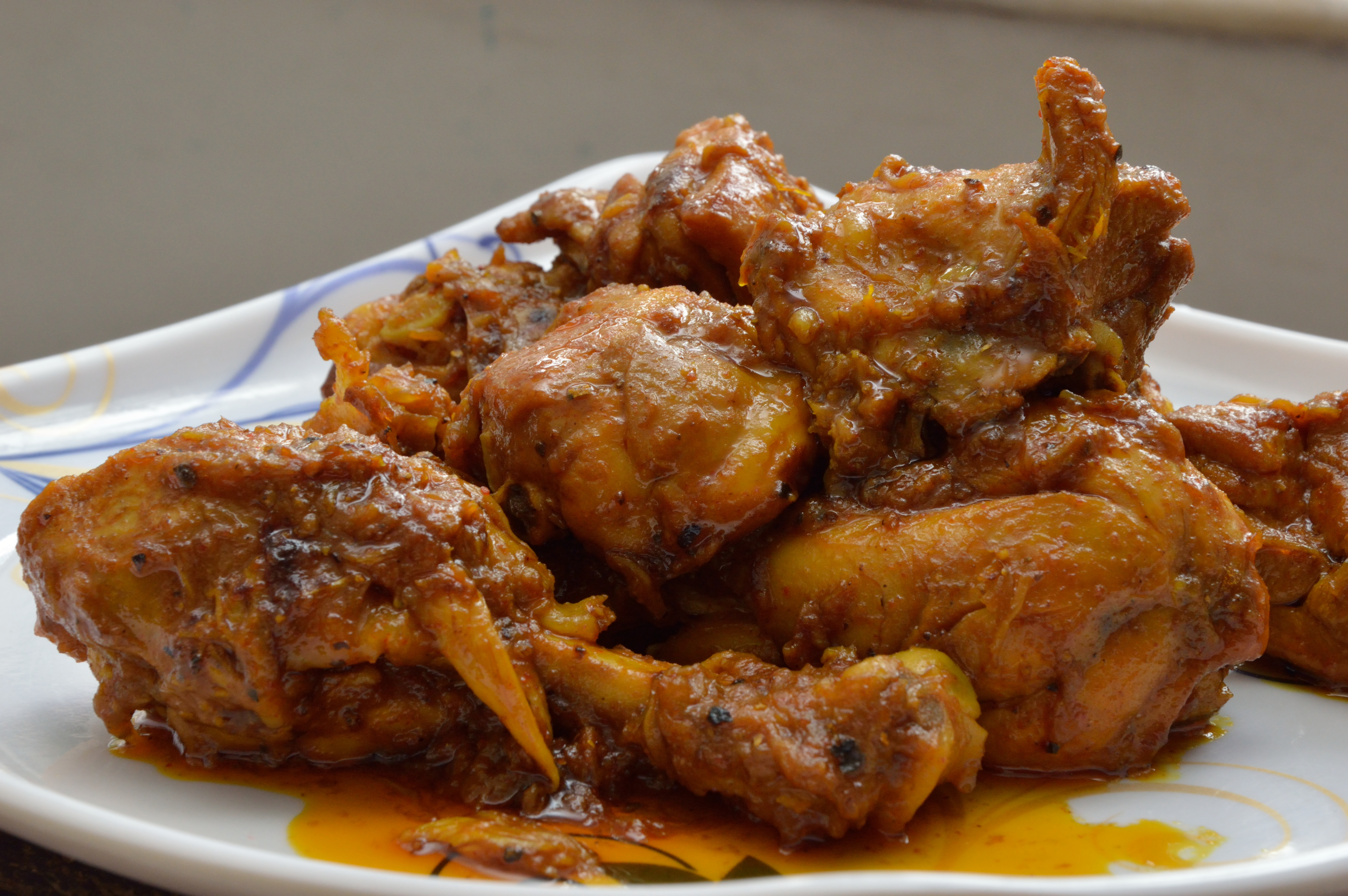
Chicken kasha is a dry chicken curry from Bengal

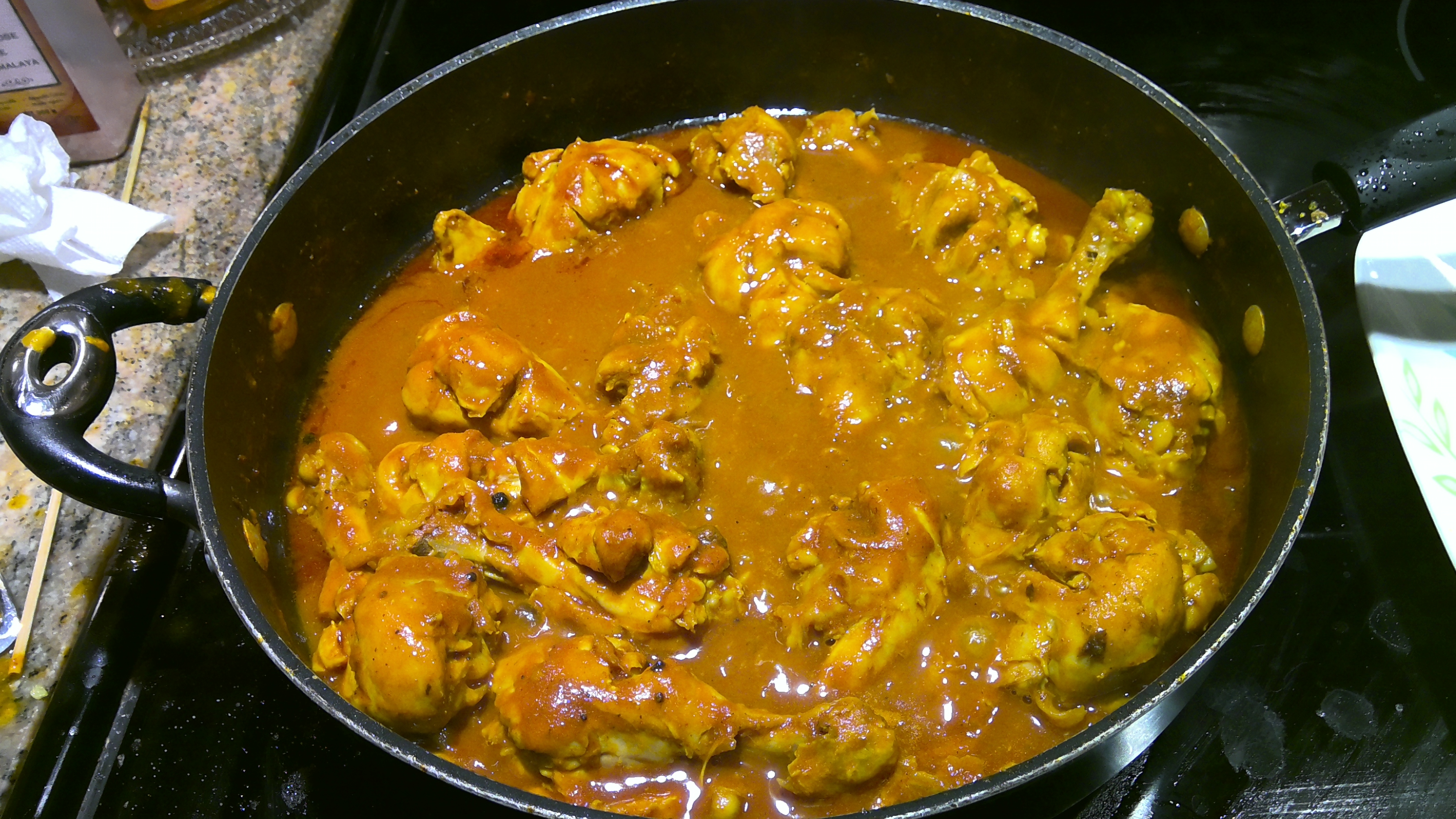
A pot of Punjabi-style chicken curry

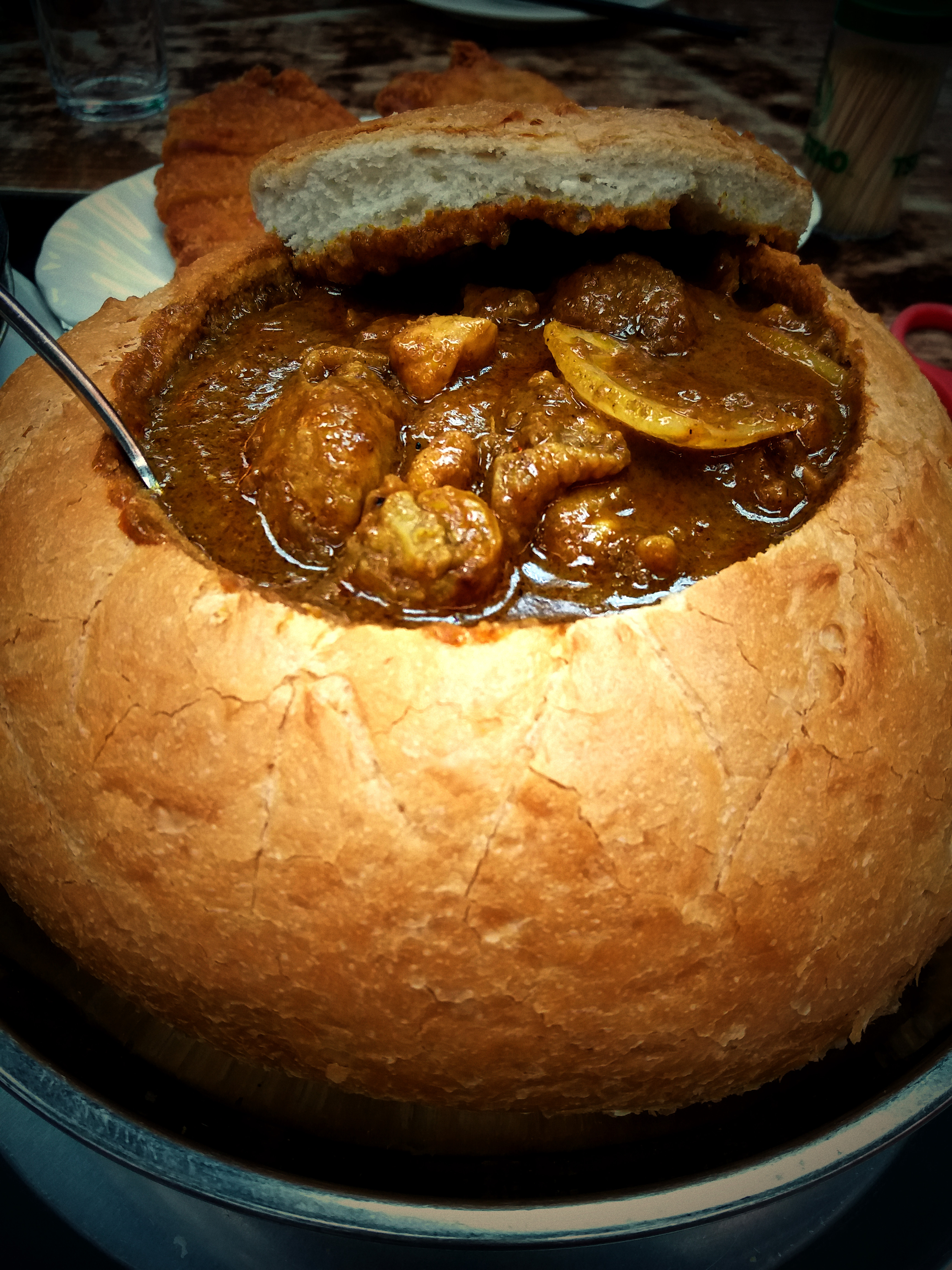
Curry chicken in a big bread provided by a Macao restaurant

=== Indian subcontinent ===
Indian cuisine has a large amount of regional variation, with many variations on the basic chicken curry recipe. Indian chicken curry typically starts with whole spices, heated in oil. A sauce is then made with onions, ginger, garlic, and tomatoes, and powdered spices. Bone-in pieces of chicken are then added to the sauce, and simmered until cooked through. In south India, coconut and curry leaves are also common ingredients. Chicken curry is usually garnished with coriander leaves, and served with rice or roti.

In south India, chicken curry may be thickened using coconut milk.

=== Caribbean ===
This dish was introduced to the Caribbeans by indentured Indian workers. At that time, the dish was very similar to the chicken curry dish of India, consisting mostly of sauce with few chicken pieces. However, poultry in Trinidad and Tobago was so readily available that the dish began consisting of mainly chicken, flavored with curry spices. Typical preparation includes seasoning and marinating the chicken meat in a green seasoning consisting of culantro, coriander, French thyme, thyme, scallion, onion, garlic, and peppers. Then the curry is prepared by first adding oil to the pot and then adding and cooking curry powder mixed with water, then the chicken. When the chicken is fried, additional ingredients are added, and the dish is left to cook until finished. It is usually served with bread or beans. Curry chicken and its derivatives are also popular in Suriname, Guyana, Jamaica, Martinique, Saint Lucia and other Caribbean territories with Indo-Caribbean influence.

=== Southeast Asia ===
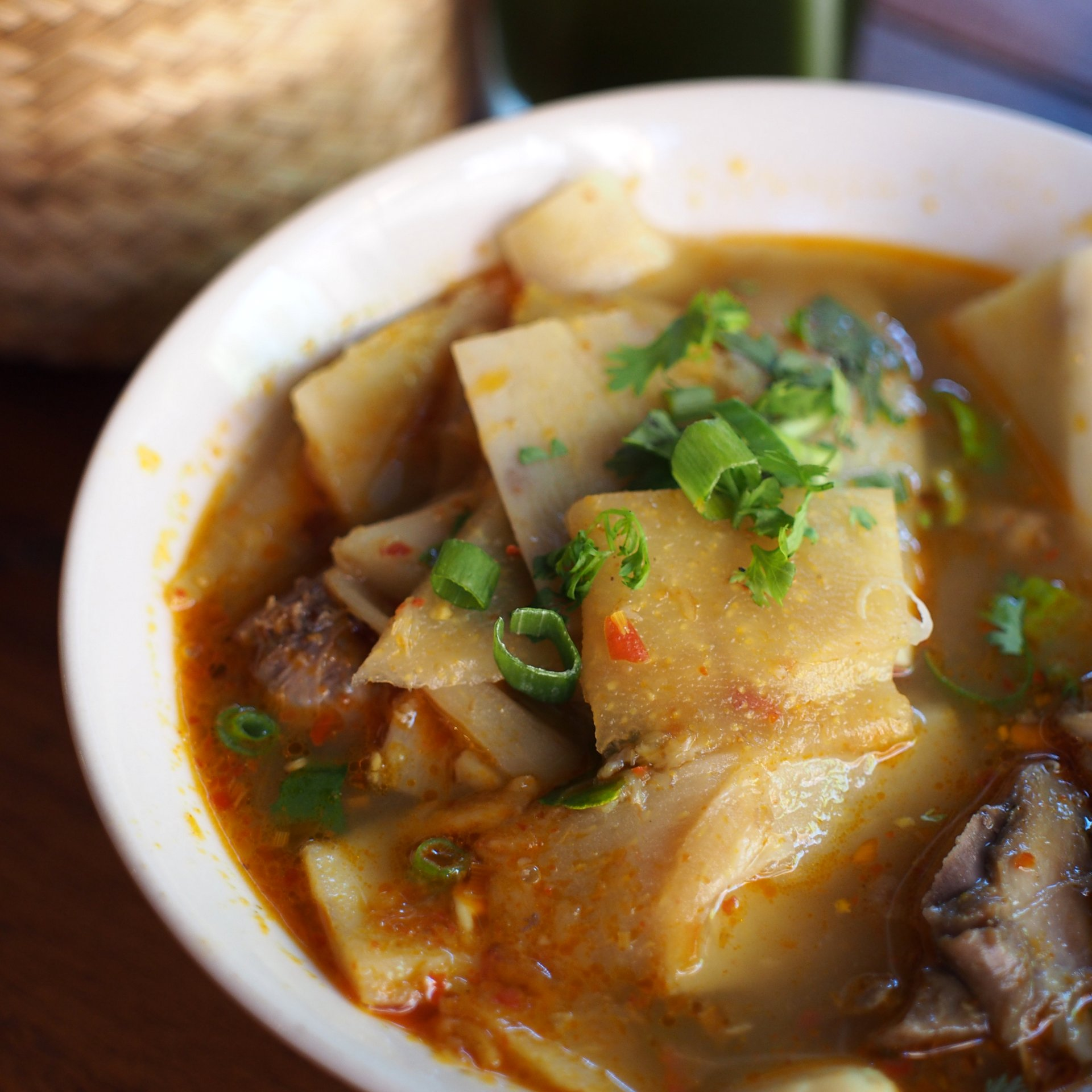
Kaeng yot maphrao sai kai is a northern Thai curry of palm shoots and chicken.

In Southeast Asia, where coconuts, and different spices originated, various native dishes made with coconut milk or curry pastes and eaten with rice are often collectively referred to as "curries" in English. Examples of these include Thai gaeng gai, Cambodian kari sach moan (Khmer: សាច់មាន់) and Filipino ginataang manok. Chicken curries feature prominently in the repertoire of Burmese curries and in Burmese ohn no khao swè, a noodle soup of coconut milk and curried chicken.

However, derivatives of Indian chicken curry may be distinguished because they are relatively modern and are made with curry powder, curry tree leaves, or other Indian spices, like the Filipino chicken curry and the Malaysian chicken curry, although they still use ingredients native to Southeast Asia.

=== North America ===
Country captain chicken is a stewed chicken dish flavored with curry powder, popular in parts of the Southern United States. The Hobson-Jobson Dictionary states the following:

COUNTRY-CAPTAIN. This is in Bengal the name of a peculiar dry kind of curry, often served as a breakfast dish. We can only conjecture that it was a favourite dish at the table of the skippers of 'country ships,' who were themselves called 'country captains,' as in our first quotation. In Madras the term is applied to a spatchcock dressed with onions and curry stuff, which is probably the original form. [Riddell says: "Country-captain.—Cut a fowl in pieces; shred an onion small and fry it brown in butter; sprinkle the fowl with fine salt and curry powder and fry it brown; then put it into a stewpan with a pint of soup; stew it slowly down to a half and serve it with rice" (Ind. Dom. Econ. 176).]

1792.—"But now, Sir, a Country Captain is not to be known from an ordinary man, or a Christian, by any certain mark whatever." — Madras Courier, April 26.

c. 1825.—"The local name for their business was the 'Country Trade,' the ships were 'Country Ships,' and the masters of them 'Country Captains.' Some of my readers may recall a dish which was often placed before us when dining on board these vessels at Whampoa, viz. 'Country Captain.'"—The Fankwae at Canton (1882), p. 33.

In 1940, Mrs. W.L. Bullard from Warm Springs, Georgia served this dish under the name "Country Captain" to Franklin D. Roosevelt and General George S. Patton.

== See also ==
- Curry
- Indian cuisine
- Pakistani cuisine
- Pakistani meat dishes
- Filipino cuisine
- Trinidad and Tobago cuisine
