= Binakol =

Filipino chicken soup

- Alternative names: Binakol na manok; Chicken binakol; Binakoe
- Course: Main course
- Place of origin: Philippines
- Region or state: Iloilo and Aklan, Western Visayas
- Serving temperature: Hot
- Main ingredients: chicken, coconut water

Binakol, also spelled binakoe, is a Filipino chicken soup made from chicken cooked in coconut water, grated coconut, green papaya (or chayote), leafy vegetables, garlic, onion, ginger, lemongrass, and patis (fish sauce). It can be spiced with chilis. Binakol can also be prepared with other types of meat or seafood. Traditionally, it was cooked inside bamboo tubes or directly in halved coconut shells. The dish originates from the Western Visayas, particularly the provinces of Iloilo and Aklan.

The dish is similar to tinola and ginataang manok, except that the latter two use water and coconut milk, respectively, instead of coconut water.

== See also ==
- Inubaran
- Pininyahang manok
- Tiyula itum
