= Canlas =

Canlas is a Filipino surname. Notable people with the surname include:

- Alberto Canlas, weightlifter who competed for the Philippines at the 1960 Summer Olympics
- Connor Anthony Canlas Sr. (born 1966), Filipino retired Air Force General
- Dante Canlas, Filipino economist and professor
- Elijah Canlas (born 2000), Filipino actor and commercial model
- James Canlas Kwekuteye (born 1998), Filipino-Canadian professional basketball player
- Jao Canlas (born 2002), Filipino singer, dancer, model, and actor
- Jeffrey Canlas, vocalist of the alternative rock band Ethigma
- Mark Canlas (born 1986), Filipino former professional basketball player
- Nelson Canlas, Filipino journalist
