= Ginataang manok =

Filipino chicken soup

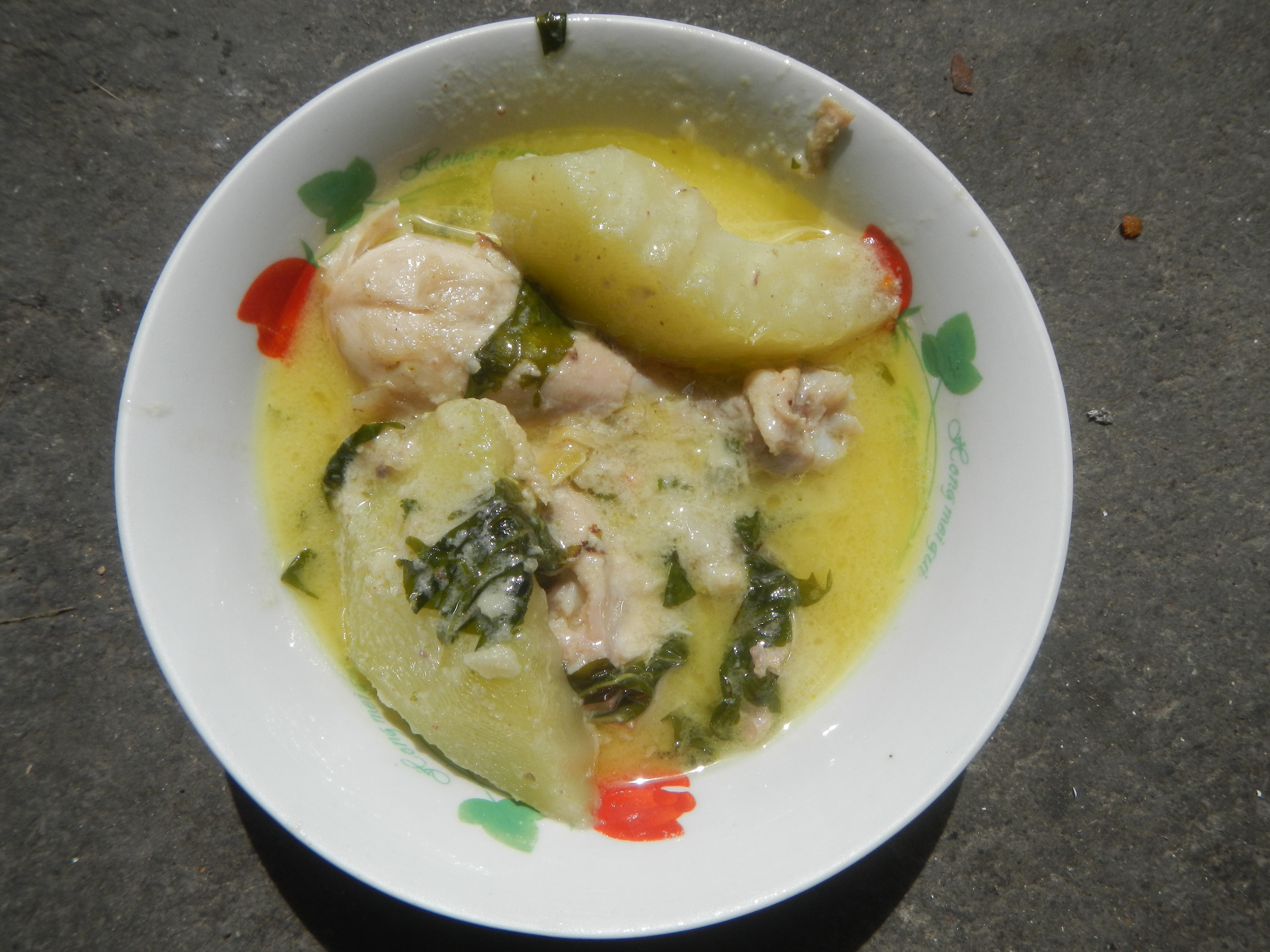
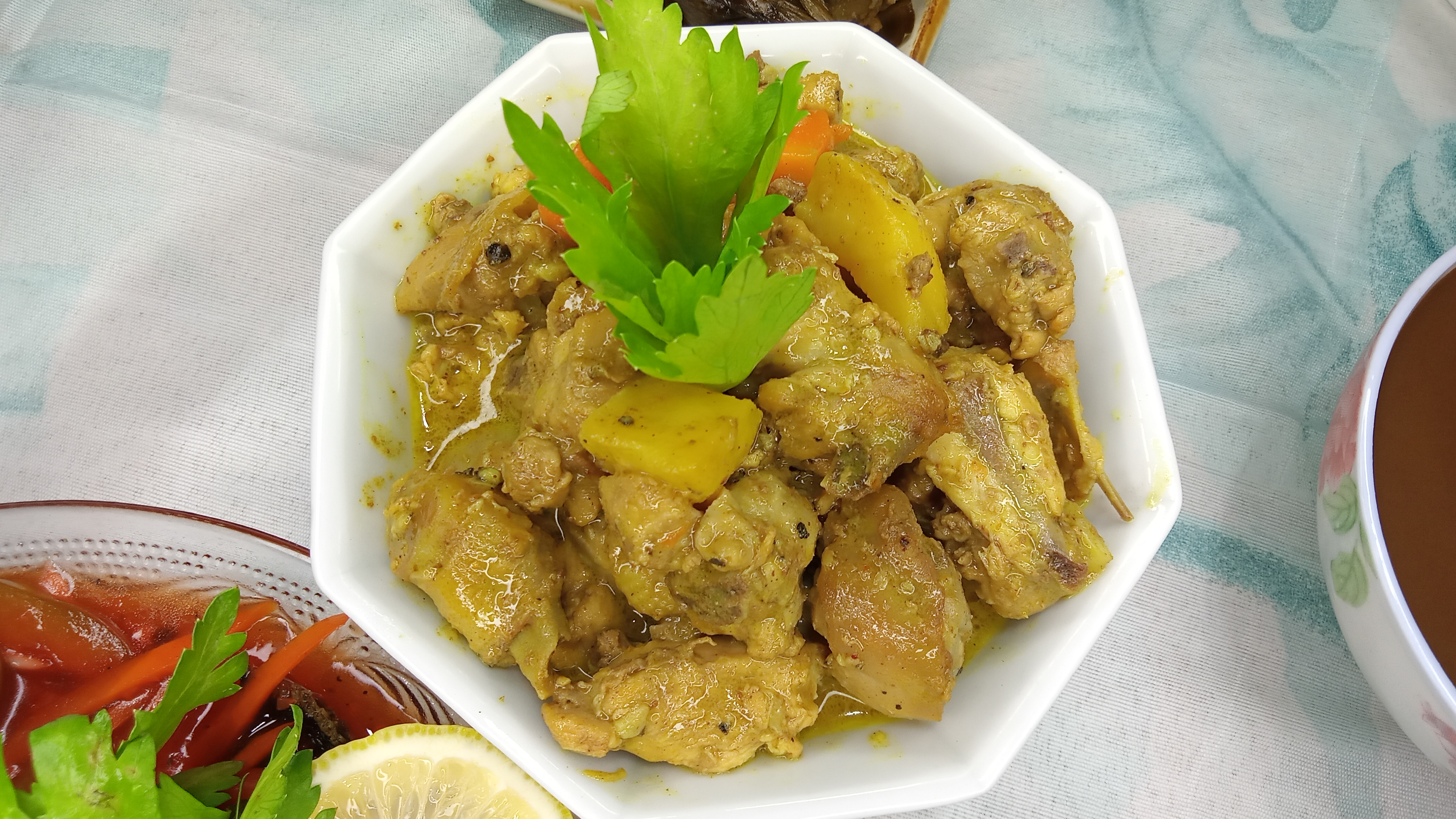
- Top: Ginataang manok with green papaya; Bottom: Filipino chicken curry, a variant with curry powder
- Alternative names: Manok sa gata
- Course: Main course
- Place of origin: Philippines
- Serving temperature: Hot
- Main ingredients: chicken, coconut milk
- Variations: Filipino chicken curry

Ginataang manok is a Filipino chicken stew made from chicken in coconut milk with green papaya and other vegetables, garlic, ginger, onion, patis (fish sauce) or bagoong alamang (shrimp paste), and salt and pepper. It is a type of ginataan. A common variant of the dish adds curry powder or non-native Indian spices and is known as Filipino chicken curry.

== Description ==
Ginataang manok is ideally made with native chickens (traditionally raised in Filipino backyards). It is first sautéed with garlic, onion, and ginger (or turmeric) until lightly browned. Coconut milk is then added along with vegetables like green papaya (or chayote), leafy vegetables (including pechay, spinach, moringa leaves, etc.), and peppers (usually bell peppers or siling haba). It is spiced with salt, pepper, and patis (fish sauce) or bagoong alamang (shrimp paste), and optionally, labuyo chilis. Coconut cream (kakang gata) is usually added shortly before it is cooked and simmered in low heat. The dish is very similar to tinola or binakol, except for the use of coconut milk.

== Variants ==
A popular variant of ginataang manok is known as "Filipino chicken curry" or "Filipino-style chicken curry". It is cooked identically to ginataang manok, but adds curry powder or non-native Indian spices. It is also more likely to use potatoes or carrots in place of green papaya or chayote.

== Similar dishes ==
Because of the ubiquity of coconut milk in Filipino cuisine, there are numerous other types of Filipino dishes that use chicken in coconut milk that are considered different dishes from ginataang manok. These include dishes like adobo sa gata, tiyula itum, pininyahang manok, and piaparan, among others.

== See also ==
- Pininyahang manok
- Tiyula itum
- Coconut soup
- List of dishes using coconut milk
