= I Love Filipino =

- Genre: Documentary
- Created by: Marnie Manicad
- Written by: Jiggy Manicad
- Directed by: Marnie Manicad
- Starring: Jiggy Manicad
- Country of origin: Philippines
- Original languages: Filipino, English
- No. of seasons: 1
- No. of episodes: 5

Production
- Executive producer: Marnie Manicad
- Producer: Team MMPI

Original release
- Network: Netflix
- Release: June 12, 2025

I Love Filipino is a 2025 Philippine documentary series created and directed by Marnie Manicad and hosted by her husband, broadcast journalist Jiggy Manicad. The five-part series was produced by Team MMPI and released on Netflix on June 12, 2025, coinciding with the 127th Philippine Independence Day.

The series aims to explore and celebrate Filipino identity and culture by examining various facets of the nation's heritage, including its cuisine, music, art, architecture, and dipping sauces (sawsawan).

== Production ==
The docuseries was a project led by director-producer Marnie Manicad and her production company, Team MMPI. Her husband, Jiggy Manicad, served as the host and head writer. The creators described the project as their "most personal project to date" and a "love letter to the Philippines". The stated goal was to create positive content to uplift the national spirit and spark a sense of nationalism and pride among Filipinos.

== Episodes ==
The series consists of five episodes, each focusing on a different element of Filipino culture.

| No. | Title | Subject | Original release date |
|---|---|---|---|
| 1 | Pinoy Altanghap | Filipino cuisine, featuring dishes like piyanggang manok, tapsilog, lechon Carcar, and sisig. | June 12, 2025 |
| 2 | Himig | Filipino music, from indigenous sounds to modern OPM. It features interviews with artists like Ryan Cayabyab and Rico Blanco. | June 12, 2025 |
| 3 | Juan with Art | The world-class artistry of Filipinos, spotlighting painter Ronald Ventura, sculptor Michael Cacnio, and comic book artist Leinil Francis Yu. | June 12, 2025 |
| 4 | SawsawJuan | The cultural significance of Filipino dipping sauces (sawsawan) such as banana ketchup, patis (fish sauce), and suka (vinegar). | June 12, 2025 |
| 5 | Bahay Kubo | The traditional bahay kubo (nipa hut) as a sustainable and enduring symbol of Filipino architecture and way of life. | June 12, 2025 |

== Reception ==
The series was generally well-received for its positive portrayal of Filipino culture and its goal of promoting national pride. Esquire Philippines noted that the series "reignites the conversation on what it means to be Filipino today." The Manila Times and other outlets highlighted its timely release on Independence Day as a call for Filipinos to reconnect with their roots.
