= Inubaran =

Filipino chicken stew or soup

- Course: Main course
- Place of origin: Philippines
- Region or state: Aklan, Western Visayas
- Serving temperature: Hot
- Main ingredients: chicken, banana pith (ubad)

Inubaran is a Filipino chicken stew or soup made with chicken cooked with diced banana pith, coconut milk (gata) or coconut cream (kakang gata), a souring agent, lemongrass, and various spices. The souring agent (called aeabihig) is traditionally either batuan fruits (Garcinia morella) or libas leaves (Spondias pinnata). The banana pith is generally from the young saba banana. The name means "[cooked] with ubad (banana pith)", not to be confused with ubod (palm heart); although ubod can sometimes be used as a substitute for ubad which can be difficult to acquire. It originates from the Western Visayas and is associated with the cuisines of the Aklanon people. Variants of the dish can also be made with other types of meat or seafood. It is a type of ginataan.

== See also ==
- Binakol
- Ginataang labong
