= Nelson Canlas =

Filipino journalist

- Occupations: Journalist; News anchor; Author; Podcaster
- Employer: GMA Network
- Known for: 24 Oras ("Chika Minute"); Updated with Nelson Canlas (podcast); Si Migoy, Ang Batang Tausug (book); Ang Kwento ni Putli Mandi (book)
- Spouse: Miguel "Miggy" Cabel Moreno
- Awards: Remarkable TV Reporter of the Year (2024 ASEAN Excellence Achievers Awards)

Nelson Canlas is a Filipino journalist, television news anchor, podcaster, and author. He is a Senior News Correspondent for GMA News, the news division of GMA Network. Canlas is an anchor for the network's entertainment news segment, "Chika Minute", on the flagship news program 24 Oras and its weekend edition.

Canlas hosts the GMA News and Public Affairs podcast, Updated with Nelson Canlas, which was launched in 2022. In 2025, he authored his first children's book, Si Migoy, Ang Batang Tausug.

== Early life and education ==
Canlas is the eldest son in his family. His mother is an OFW, and his younger siblings have resided in the United States since he was 17.

Canlas initially enrolled in marketing and later studied computer programming for two years at De La Salle University. He eventually pursued a degree in journalism.

== Career ==
=== GMA Network ===
Canlas is a Senior News Correspondent at GMA Network. He first anchored the "Chika Minute" segment on 24 Oras on May 4, 2011, substituting for then-main anchor Pia Guanio. He later became a regular anchor for the segment on 24 Oras Weekend.

=== Updated with Nelson Canlas (Podcast) ===
In May 2022, Canlas began hosting Updated with Nelson Canlas, a podcast dedicated to entertainment news. The program features long-form interviews with personalities from the Kapuso network. Episodes have included interviews with Barbie Forteza and David Licauco, as well as retrospective specials on 1990s Philippine showbiz.

=== Si Migoy, Ang Batang Tausug (Book) ===
Canlas' first children's book, Si Migoy, Ang Batang Tausug, was launched in February 2025. The story is inspired by the childhood of his husband, Chef Miguel "Miggy" Cabel Moreno, and aims to promote the culture of Mindanao. The book is written in Tagalog, English, and Bahasa Sug. It is the first of a planned four-book series on the heritage of Mindanao.

== Personal life ==
Canlas is married to Chef Miguel "Miggy" Cabel Moreno. His family owns Palm Grill, a restaurant in Luzon that serves Mindanaoan food.

== Awards and recognition ==
Remarkable TV Reporter of the Year, 2024 ASEAN Excellence Achievers Awards

== Notable incidents ==
In December 2024, during a World AIDS Day event, Canlas was involved in an incident with a representative from the Department of Health. Media reports stated that the representative publicly confronted Canlas and demanded the deletion of a taped interview with Pia Wurtzbach after a question was asked concerning actress Heart Evangelista.

In response, Canlas posted a statement on his social media account. He later stated that he was expecting a formal letter of request from the representative.
