= Tiyula itum =

Filipino cuisine

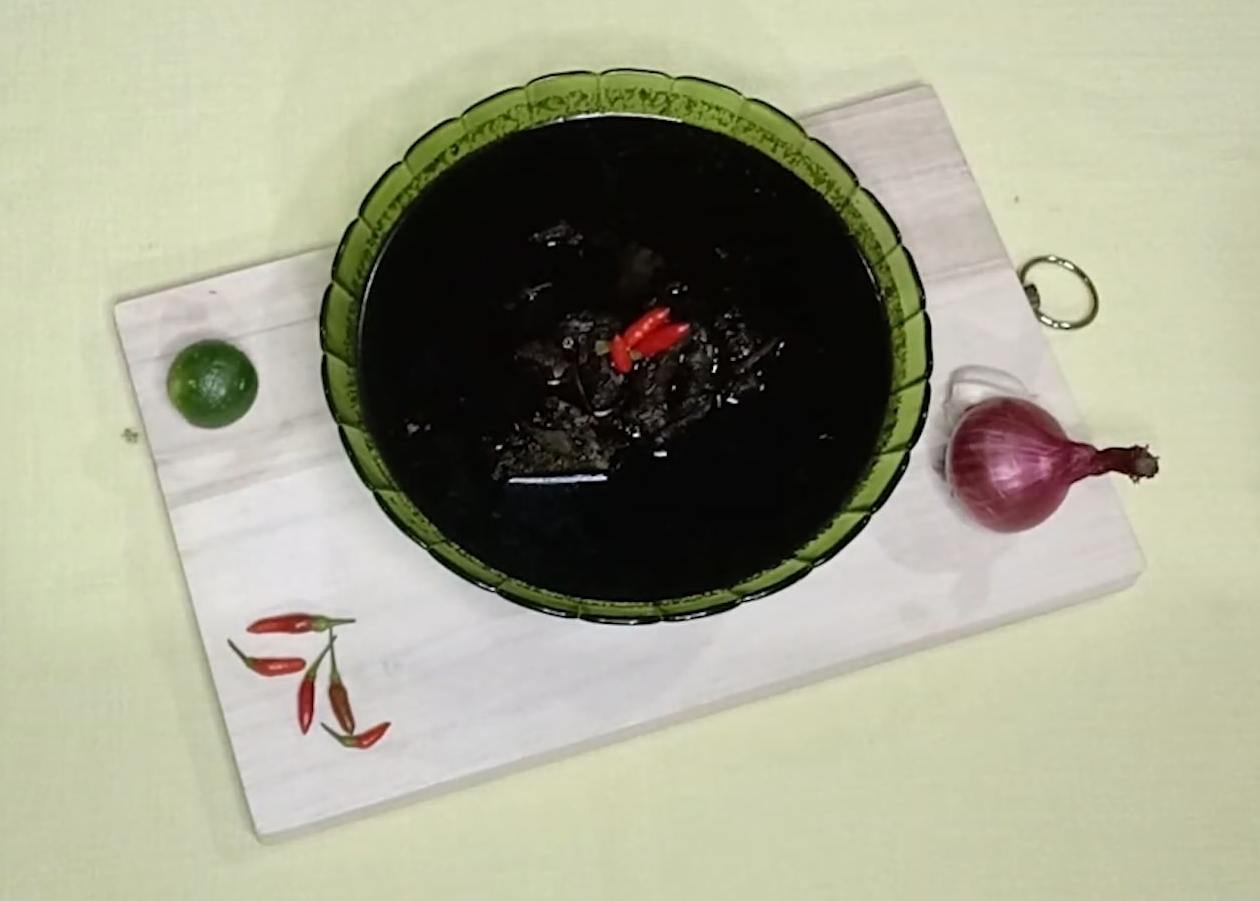
- A bowl of Tiyula Itum served with siling labuyo
- Alternative names: tiyula' itum, tiyula' Sūg, tiyula Sūg, tyula itum, tiula itum, tiyulah itum, tiyulah Sūg
- Course: Main course
- Place of origin: Philippines
- Region or state: Sulu, Basilan, Tawi-Tawi, Zamboanga Peninsula
- Created by: Tausūg people
- Serving temperature: Hot
- Main ingredients: Beef (or goat), burnt coconut meat, ginger, turmeric, lengkuas, lemongrass, black pepper, garlic, onion
- Similar dishes: Piyanggang manok, tinola, bulalo

Tiyula itum (English: "black soup") is a Filipino braised beef or goat soup or stew originating from the Tausug people. The dish is characteristically black due to the unique use of charred coconut meat.

== Etymology ==
The name of the dish refers to the black, gray, or greenish color of the broth which is the result of using charred coconut meat. It is related to the tinola and nilaga dishes of other Filipino ethnic groups. It is also known as tiyula Sūg ("Sulu soup") or tinolang itím (the Tagalog cognate of tiyula itum).

== Description ==
Tiyula itum is prepared by rubbing and marinating chunks of beef in a pounded mixture of spices (pamapa) and powdered burnt coconut meat. It is then fried with garlic, onions, turmeric, ginger, and lengkuas. Once the meat is lightly browned, water is added along with additional ingredients like black pepper, lemongrass, and shallots and allowed to simmer until cooked. Coconut milk is sometimes added to thicken the broth. Other ingredients like tomatoes and siling haba chilis are also sometimes added, but they are not traditional ingredients. Tiyula itum is traditionally served with white rice or tamu rice cakes.

Tiyula itum is also found in overseas Tausug communities (Suluk) in Sabah, Malaysia, and North Kalimantan, Indonesia.

== Cultural importance ==
Tiyula itum is culturally important among the Tausug people and it is sometimes characterized as "food for the royalty". It is commonly prepared on special occasions such as weddings and Hari Raya festivities.

== Online popularity ==
On his YouTube series, Best Ever Food Review Show, host Sonny Side featured Tiyula Itum in an episode ironically titled "Eating Asia's Worst Rated Food!". Introduced by Chef Miguel "Miggy" Cabel Moreno, the black beef soup was prepared with marinated beef, burnt coconut meat, various spices, and served with charred bone marrow. Sonny declared it, "...probably one of the best foods I've ever had in the Philippines, if I'm being 100% honest."

== See also ==
- Piyanggang manok
- Kulawo
- Bulalo
- Kaldereta
- Pastil
