= Best Ever Food Review Show =

YouTube food and travel channel

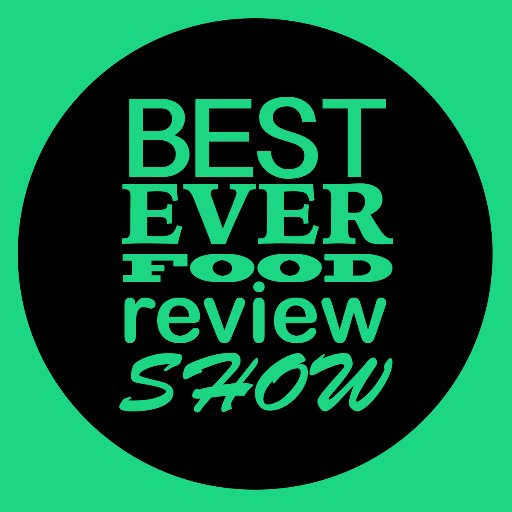
- Born: William Sonbuchner; August 22, 1984 (age 42); St. Cloud, Minnesota, U.S.

YouTube information
- Channel: Best Ever Food Review Show
- Years active: 11
- Genres: Food & Travel
- Subscribers: 12.2 million
- Views: 3.3 billion
- Last updated: October 22, 2026

Best Ever Food Review Show is a YouTube food and travel channel created by American filmmaker Will Sonbuchner (born August 22, 1984), alias Sonny Side. The production team is based in Vietnam and films episodes globally. In 2020, the channel won a Webby Award for "People's Voice: Viral Video of The Year" and the Webby Official Honoree for Food & Drink. As of December 2025, the channel has 11.9 million subscribers.

== History ==
William Sonbuchner (Sonny) was born in St. Cloud, Minnesota on August 22, 1984. In his early years, Sonny and his older brother Timothy attended Sauk Rapids-Rice High School. After attending three different colleges and working various menial jobs, he decided to make a significant life switch. At the age of 24, he moved to South Korea with only $2,000 in his bank account. There, he taught English and learned film production. Sonny even did video work for "second-tier K-pop stars" while there.

Sonny created the Best Ever Food Review Show (BEFRS) YouTube channel on September 23, 2010, and uploaded the first episode on December 14, 2015. Since its inception, the channel has explored many different cuisines from around the world, from India to Cuba.

In 2019, it became the first US-owned YouTube channel to receive filming access in Iran.

In 2020, the show won the People’s Voice Award in the Viral Video category at the 24th Annual Webby Awards, and received a Webby Official Honoree for Food & Drink.
