= Piyanggang manok =

Filipino chicken dish

- Alternative names: Pyanggang manuk, Pianggang manuk, Piyanggang, Pyanggang, Pianggang
- Course: Main dish
- Place of origin: The Philippines
- Region or state: Sulu, Basilan, Tawi-Tawi, Zamboanga Peninsula
- Serving temperature: Hot
- Main ingredients: Chicken, turmeric, onions, lemongrass, ginger, siling haba, garlic, coconut milk, ground burnt coconut
- Similar dishes: Tiyula itum

Piyanggang manok, also spelled pyanggang manuk (English: "grilled or roasted chicken"), is a Filipino dish consisting of chicken braised in turmeric, onions, lemongrass, ginger, siling haba chilis, garlic, coconut milk, and ground burnt coconut. It originates from the Tausug people of Sulu. It is related to tiyula itum, another Tausug dish which uses burnt coconut. The dish is characteristically black in color. The meat may also be grilled before adding the marinade. It is a type of ginataan.

== See also ==
- Kulawo
- Tinola
- Tiyula itum
- List of chicken dishes
