= Tausūg people =

Austronesian ethnic group in Maritime Southeast Asia

Tausug Joloano Suluk
Tau Sūg تَؤُ سُوْݢْ
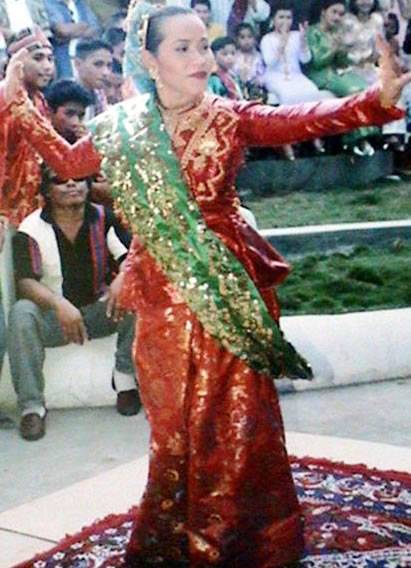
- A Tausug woman wearing traditional attire and performing a pangalay dance

Total population
- c. 1.9–2.2 million^{[a]}

Regions with significant populations
- Philippines: 1,615,823
- Malaysia: 209,000–500,000
- Indonesia: 12,000

Languages
- Native: Tausug; Lingua francas: Chavacano; Cebuano; Sama; Filipino; Sabah Malay; Standard Malay; English (in both Philippines and Malaysia); Indonesian

Religion
- Predominantly: Sunni Islam

Related ethnic groups
- Butuanons; Sama-Bajau; Surigaonons; Yakan (other Moros and wider Austronesian peoples)
- ^{a} This figure is a cumulative total based on referenced populations.

The Tausug (also spelled Tausog; natively Tau Sūg, Jawi: تَؤُ سُوْݢْ) are an Austronesian ethnic group native to the Sulu Archipelago and northeastern coastal areas of Borneo, which spans present-day Philippines, Malaysia and Indonesia. Large Tausug populations are also found in the cities of mainland Mindanao, in particular Zamboanga City, Cotabato City and Davao City, and the island of Palawan. Smaller Tausug populations can be found in Nunukan and Tarakan in North Kalimantan, Indonesia.

Following the introduction of Islam to the Sulu Archipelago in the 14th century, the Tausug established the Sultanate of Sulu, a thalassocratic state that exercised sovereignty over the islands that bordered the Zamboanga Peninsula in the east to Palawan in the north. At its peak, it also covered areas further inland in northeastern Borneo and southwestern Mindanao. During the Spanish colonial period of the Philippines, Tausug soldiers resisted repeated Spanish invasions and the Sultanate of Sulu remained a de facto independent state until 1915, following the Moro Rebellion which resulted in the state being annexed by the United States.

Following the independence of the Philippines in 1946, the Philippines has acted as the successor state of the Sultanate of Sulu, which has led to tensions with neighboring predominantly-Christian ethnic groups. Today, the Tausug form a part of the wider Muslim-majority Moro political identity in the Philippines, and have continued their shared struggle for self-determination. This has culminated in a decades-long insurgency in Mindanao, and a territorial dispute between Malaysia and the Philippines. In Malaysia, ethnic Tausug people are known by the exonym Suluk and have more recently formed a distinct socio-political identity from Tausug refugees arriving in Malaysia due to continued conflict in the southern Philippines.

== Etymology ==
The first half of the name Tausug derives from the Tausug word tau, meaning "person" or "people." The term sūg is widely accepted to derive from the word meaning sea current, with the definition of the whole name meaning “people of the [sea] currents”.

Sūg is the modern form of the older term Sulug (meaning "[sea] currents"), which was also the old name of the island of Jolo. It is derived from Proto-Malayo-Polynesian *sələg (“flowing water, current”), and is a cognate of Cebuano sulog, Tagalog silig, and Malay suluk.

== History ==
=== Pre-Islamic era ===
During the 13th century, the Tausug people began migrating to present-day Zamboanga and the Sulu archipelago from their homelands in northeastern Mindanao. William Scott (1994) calls the Tausugs the descendants of the ancient Butuanons and Surigaonons from the Rajahnate of Butuan, who moved south and established a spice trading port in Sulu. Sultan Batarah Shah Tengah, who ruled in 1600, was said to have been a native of Butuan. The Butuanon-Surigaonon origin of the Tausugs is suggested by the relationship of their languages, as the Butuanon, Surigaonon and Tausug languages are all grouped under the Southern Visayan sub-family. Consequently, the Tausug language is closely related to other Southern Bisayan languages like the Butuanon language, which is still spoken in northeastern Mindanao to this day.

Prior to the establishment of the sultanate, the Tausug lived in communities called banwa. Each banwa was headed by a leader known as a panglima along with a shaman called a mangungubat. The shaman could be either a man or a woman. Each banwa was considered an independent state, like other city-states in Asia. The Tausug of the era had trade relations with neighboring Tausug banwas, the Yakan people of Basilan, and the nomadic Sama-Bajau.

The Tausug were Islamized in the 14th century and established the sultanate of Sulu in the 15th century, and eventually dominated the local Sama-Bajau people of the Sulu archipelago,

=== Sultanate era ===
The flag of the Sulu sultanate in the late 19th century.

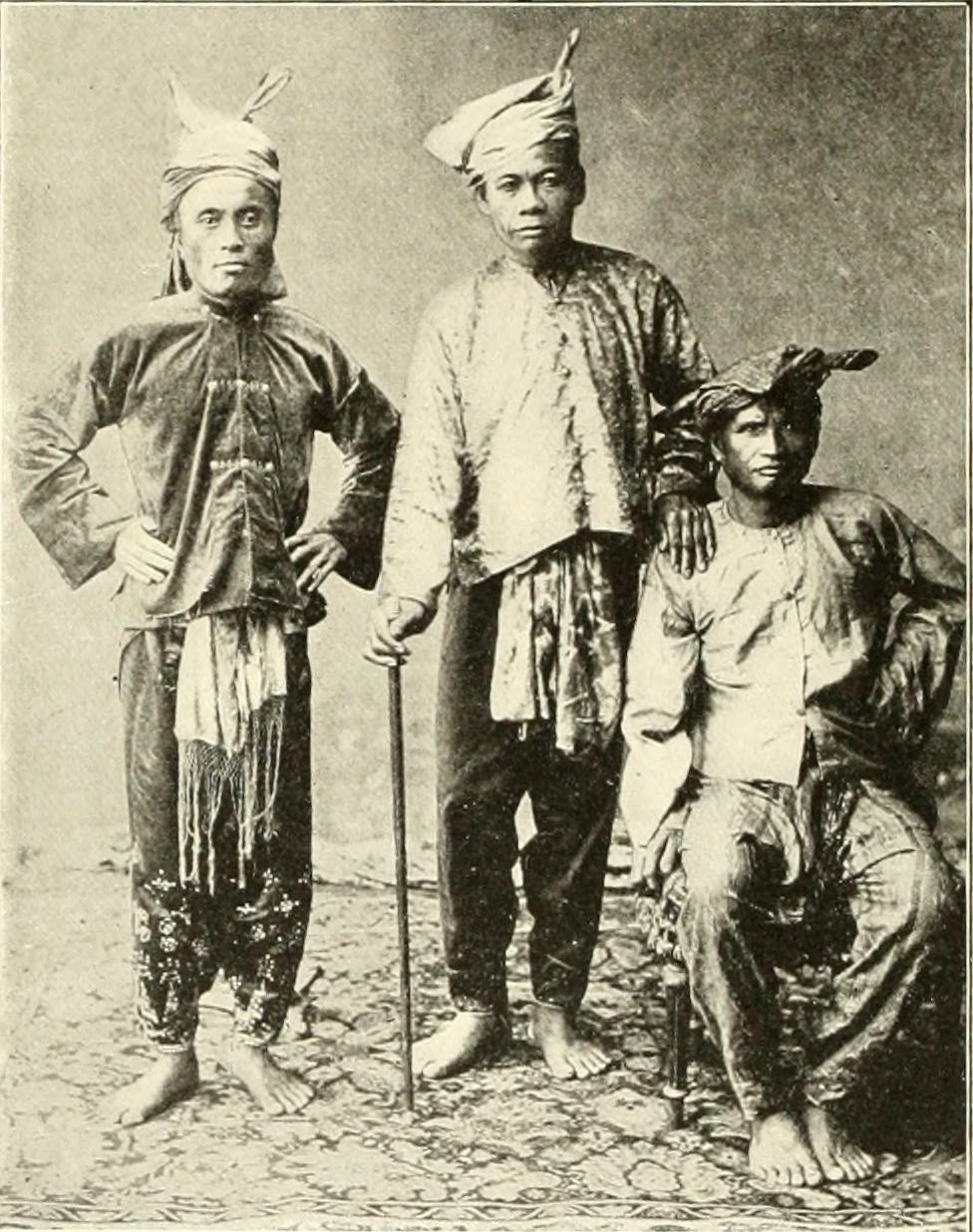
The chieftains of Sulu, from The Philippine Islands (c. 1899).

In 1380, the Sunni Sufi scholar Karim-ul Makhdum, a Muslim missionary of the Ash'ari Aqeeda and Shafi'i madhhab, arrived in Sulu. He introduced the Islamic faith and settled in Tubig Indangan in Simunul, where he lived until his death. The pillars of a mosque he had built at Tubig-Indangan still stand. In 1390, Rajah Baguinda Ali landed at Buansa, and continued the missionary work of Makhdum. The Johore-born Arab adventurer Sayyid Abubakar Abirin arrived in 1450, and married Baguinda's daughter, Dayang-dayang Paramisuli. After Rajah Baguinda's death, Sayyid Abubakar became sultan, thereby introducing the sultanate as a political system (see Sultanate of Sulu). Political districts were created in Parang, Pansul, Lati, Gitung, and Luuk, each headed by a panglima or district leader. After the Sunni Sufi scholar Sayyid Abubakar's death, the sultanate system had already become well established in Sulu. Before the coming of the Spaniards, the ethnic groups in Sulu — the Tausug, Samal, Yakan, and the Bajau – were united to varying degrees under the Sulu sultanate following the Sunni Islam, they were Ash'ari in aqeeda and Shafi'i in Madh'hab as well as practitioners of Sufism.

The political system of the sultanate was patrilineal. The sultan was the sole sovereign of the sultanate, followed by various maharajah and rajah-titled subdivisional princes. Further down the line were the numerous panglima or local chiefs, similar in function to the modern Philippine political post of the barangay captain in the barangay system.

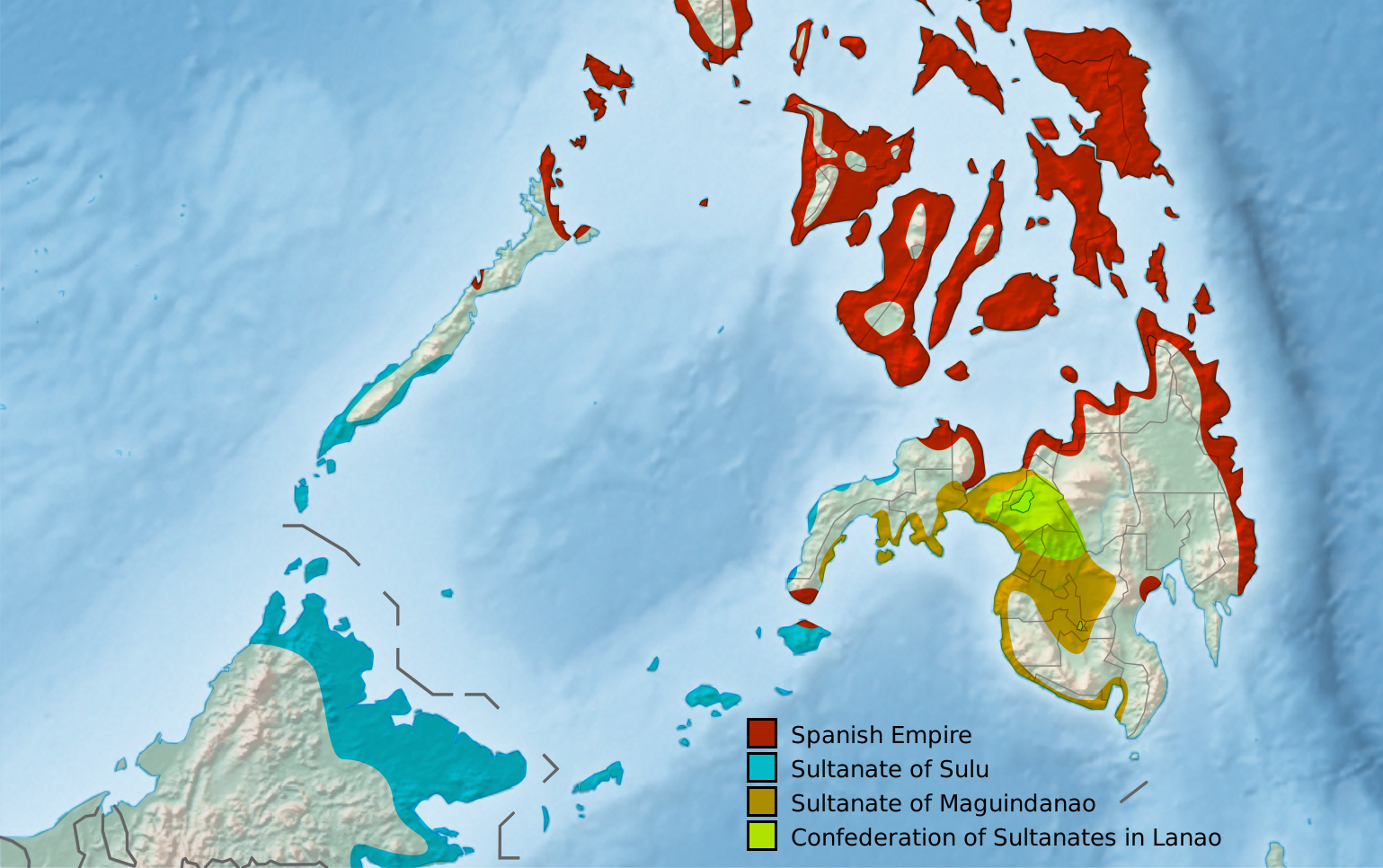
The Sulu sultanate at its greatest extent (blue)

The Sulu Archipelago was an entrepôt that attracted merchants from south China and various parts of Southeast Asia beginning in the 14th century. The name "Sulu" is attested in Chinese historical records as early as 1349, during the late Yuan dynasty, suggesting trade relations around this time. Trade continued into the early Ming dynasty (1368–1644), as envoys were sent in several missions to China to trade and pay tribute to the emperor. Sulu merchants often exchanged goods with Chinese Muslims, and there was also trade with Muslims who were of Arab, Persian, Malay, or Indian descent. Islamic historian Cesar Adib Majul argues that Islam was introduced to the Sulu Archipelago in the late 14th century by Chinese and Arab merchants and missionaries from Ming China. Moreover, these 7 Arab missionaries were called "Lumpang Basih" by the Tausug and they were Sunni Sufi Scholars from the Ba 'Alawi sada of Yemen.

Around this time, a notable Arab judge, Sunni Sufi and religious scholar named Karim ul-Makhdum (Note: May be interchange to Karimul Makhdum, Karimal Makdum or Makhdum Karim among others. Makhdum came from the Arabic word makhdūmīn, which means "master".) from Mecca arrived in Malacca. He preached Islam, particularly the Ash'ari Aqeeda and Shafi'i Madh'hab as well as the Qadiriyya Tariqa to the people, and thus many citizens, including the ruler of Malacca, converted to Islam. The Sulu leader Paduka Pahala and his sons moved to China, where he died, and Chinese Muslims brought up his sons in Dezhou, where their descendants live and have the surnames An and Wen. In 1380 AD, (Note: Another uncertain date in Philippine Islamic history is the year of arrival of Karim ul-Makhdum. Though other Muslim scholars place the date as simply "the end of 14th century", Saleeby calculated the year as 1380 AD corresponding to the description of the tarsilas, in which Karim ul-Makhdum's coming is 10 years before Rajah Baguinda's. The 1380 reference originated from the event in Islamic history when a huge number of makhdūmīn started to travel to Southeast Asia from India. See Ibrahim's "Readings on Islam in Southeast Asia.") Karim ul-Makhdum arrived in Simunul island from Malacca, again with Arab traders. Apart from being a scholar, he operated as a trader; some see him as a Sufi missionary originating from Mecca. He preached Islam in the area, and was thus accepted by the core Muslim community. He was the second person who preached Islam in the area, following Tuan Mashā′ikha. To facilitate easy conversion of nonbelievers, he established a mosque in Tubig-Indagan, Simunul, which became the first Islamic temple to be constructed in the area, as well as the first in the Philippines. This later became known as Sheik Karimal Makdum Mosque. He died in Sulu, although the exact location of his grave is unknown. In Buansa, he was known as Tuan Sharif Awliyā On his alleged grave in Bud Agad, Jolo, an inscription reassure "Mohadum Aminullah Al-Nikad". In Lugus, he is referred to as Abdurrahman. In Sibutu, he is known by his name.

The difference of beliefs on his grave location came about due to the fact that the Qadiri Shaykh Karim ul-Makhdum travelled to several islands in the Sulu Sea to preach Islam. In many places in the archipelago, he was beloved. It is said that the people of Tapul built a mosque honoring him and that they claim descent from Karim ul-Makhdum. Thus, the success of Karim ul-Makhdum of spreading Islam in Sulu threw a new light in Islamic history in the Philippines. The customs, beliefs and political laws of the people changed and customized to adopt the Islamic tradition.

Sulu abruptly stopped sending tributes to the Ming in 1424. Antonio Pigafetta, in his journals, records that the sultan of Brunei went and invaded Sulu in order subjugate the nation and retrieve the two sacred pearls Sulu pillaged from Brunei during earlier times. A sultan of Brunei, Sultan Bolkiah, married a princess (dayang-dayang) of Sulu, Puteri Laila Menchanai, and they became the grandparents of the Muslim prince of Maynila, Rajah Matanda, as Manila was a Muslim city-state and vassal to Brunei before the Spanish colonized them and converted them from Islam to Christianity. Islamic Manila ended after the failed attack of Tarik Sulayman, a Muslim Kapampangan commander, in the failure of the Conspiracy of the Maharlikas, when the formerly Muslim Manila nobility attempted a secret alliance with the Japanese shogunate and Bruneiean sultanate (together with her Manila and Sulu allies) to expel the Spaniards from the Philippines. Many Tausugs and other native Muslims of Sulu Sultanate already interacted with Kapampangan and Tagalog Muslims called Luzones based in Brunei, and there were intermarriages between them. The Spanish had native allies against the former Muslims they conquered like Hindu Tondo which resisted Islam when Brunei invaded and established Manila as a Muslim city-state to supplant Hindu Tondo.

Battles and skirmishes were waged intermittently from 1578 till 1898 between the Spanish colonial government and the Moros of Mindanao and the Sulu archipelago. In 1578, an expedition sent by Governor Francisco de Sande and headed by Captain Rodriguez de Figueroa began the 300-year conflict between the Tausūgs and the Spanish authorities. In 1579, the Spanish government gave de Figueroa the sole right to colonize Mindanao. In retaliation, the Moro raided Visayan towns in Panay, Negros, and Cebu, for they knew the Spanish conscripted foot soldiers from these areas. Such Moro raids were repelled by Spanish and Visayan forces. In the early 17th century, the largest alliance, comprising Maranao, Maguindanao, Tausūg, and other Moro and Lumad groups, was formed by Sultan Kudarat or Cachil Corralat of Maguindanao, ruler of domains extending from the Davao Gulf to Dapitan on the Zamboanga peninsula. Several Spanish expeditions suffered defeat at their hands. In 1635, Captain Juan de Chaves erected a fort and established a settlement in Zamboanga. In 1637, Governor General Sebastián Hurtado de Corcuera personally led an expedition against Kudarat, and temporarily triumphed over his forces at Lamitan and Iliana Bay. On 1 January 1638, Hurtado de Corcuera, with 80 vessels and 2000 soldiers, defeated the Moro Tausūg and occupied Jolo, mainly staying inside captured Cottas. A peace treaty was forged, but Spanish sovereignty over Sulu still had not been firmly established; the Tausūg abrogated the treaty in 1646 soon after the Spaniards occupiers departed. It wasn't until 1705 that the sultanate renounced to Spain any sovereignty it had previously asserted over south Palawan, and in 1762 it similarly relinquished its claims over Basilan. During the last quarter of the 19th century, the sultanate formally recognized Spanish sovereignty, but these areas remained partially controlled by the Spanish, with their sovereignty limited to military stations, garrisons, and pockets of civilian settlements in Zamboanga and Cotabato (the latter under the Sultanate of Maguindanao). Eventually, as a consequence of their defeat in the Spanish–American War, the Spanish had to abandon the region entirely.

In 1737, Sultan Alimud Din I, advancing his own personal interests, entered into a "permanent" peace treaty with Governor General F. Valdes y Tamon; and in 1746, he befriended the Jesuits sent to Jolo by King Philip. The "permission" of Sultan Azimuddin-I (*the first heir-apparent) allowed Catholic Jesuits to enter Jolo, but his younger brother, Raja Muda Maharajah Adinda Datu Bantilan (*the second heir-apparent) argued against this, saying that he did not want the Catholic Jesuits to disturb or dishonor Islamic faith among the Moro in Sulu. The two brothers' disagreement eventually caused Sultan Azimuddin-I to depart Jolo, first removing to Zamboanga and eventually arriving in Manila 1748. Upon his departure, his brother Raja Muda Maharajah Adinda Datu Bantilan was proclaimed sultan, taking the name Sultan Bantilan Muizzuddin.

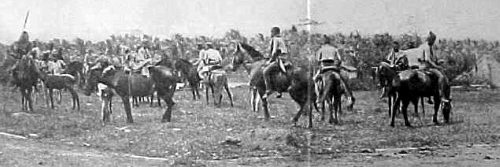
Tausūg horsemen in Sulu, taken on 30 December 1899.

In 1893, amid succession controversies, Amir ul Kiram became Sultan Jamalul Kiram II, the title being officially recognized by the Spanish authorities. In 1899, after the defeat of Spain in the Spanish–American War, Colonel Luis Huerta, the last governor of Sulu, relinquished his garrison to the Americans. (Orosa 1970:25–30).

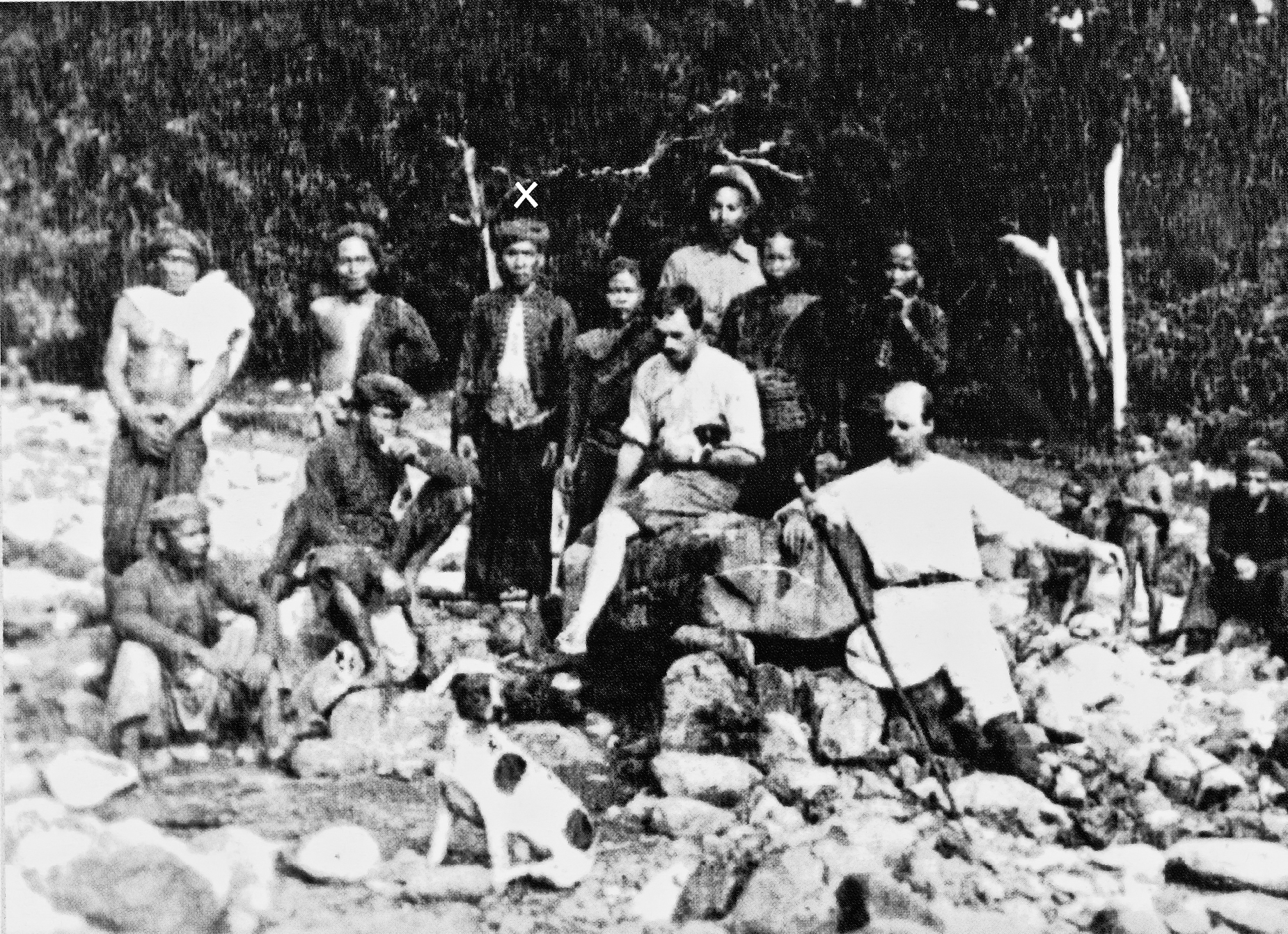
Mat Salleh (marked with an "X"), a Bajau-Suluk warrior widely known in North Borneo (present day Sabah).

In northern Borneo, most citizen families residing in Sabah are generally-recognized to have lived in the area since the time of the sultanate. (Note: Most of the native Suluks in Sabah have lived there since before the formation of Malaysia. At that time, everyone living within Malaysian borders automatically gained citizenship, as contrasted with later immigrants from the Philippines arriving after the country had been formed.) Local North Borneo records indicate that during the period of British rule, a notable Bajau-Suluk warrior participated in the Mat Salleh Rebellion, participating in the conflict until his death. During the Second World War when the Japanese occupied the northern Borneo area, many Suluk people, along with ethnic Chinese emigrants, were massacred by Japanese soldiers during the Jesselton Revolt against the Japanese invasion and occupation.

The Tausug had a saying, "Mayayao pa muti in bukug ayaw in tikud-tikud" (It is preferable to see the whiteness of your bone due to wounds than whiten your heel from running away) and in magsabil "when one runs amuck and he is able to kill a nonbeliever and in turn gets killed for it, his place in heaven is assured."

The Tausug waged parang sabil (holy war) for their land (Lupah Sug) and religion against the United States after Bud Bagsak and Bud Dahu and during the Moro National Liberation Front's struggle against the Philippines since 1972, with them being memorialized in tales of Parang Sabil like "The Story of War in Zambo" (Kissa sin Pagbunu ha Zambo about MNLF commander Ustadz Habier Malik's 2013 attack in Zamboanga.

Some Tausug who went on parang sabil did it to redeem themselves in causes of dishonor (hiya). Tausug believe the sabils gain divine protection and can be immune to bullets while going on their suicide attacks. Tausug committed parrangsabil in 1984 at Pata island, 1974 at Jolo, 1968 at Corregidor island, 1913 at Bud Bagsak, 1911 at Bud Talipaw, 1911 and 1906 at Bud Dahu. Tausug believe that the rituals they undergo in preparation for magsasabil and parrangsabil will render them invulnerable to bulles, metal and sharp weapons and that Allah will protect them and determine their fate while using their budjak spears, barung and kalis against enemies like the Americans and Spanish.

Baker Atyani an Arab journalist, was kidnapped by the Abu Sayyaf group. On 3 February 2013 Ustaz Habir Malik led the MNLF to fight against Abu Sayyaf and demanded they released the hostages. Jolo was burned by Philippines on 7 February 1974, Spanish on 29 February 1896 & 27–28 February 1851.

On 5 April 2019 MNLF member Abdul was interviewed by Elgin Glenn Salomon and said about the battle of Jolo in 1974 between the Philippines and MNLF. “They could not defeat the people of Sulu. See the Japanese, the Americans, and the Spaniards! They cannot defeat the province of Jolo. Until now, they could not defeat…. See, they (MNLF) have three guns… At the age of 12, they already have a gun. Will the soldiers continue to enter their territory? The heavy-duty soldiers would die at their (MNLF) hands.”

=== Modern era ===
==== Philippines ====
A "policy of attraction" was introduced, ushering in reforms to encourage Muslim integration into Philippine society. "Proxy colonialism" was legalized by the Public Land Act of 1919, invalidating Tausūg pusaka (inherited property) laws based on the Islamic Shariah. The act also granted the state the right to confer land ownership. It was thought that the Muslims would "learn" from the "more advanced" Christian Filipinos, and would integrate more easily into mainstream Philippine society. In February 1920, the Philippine Senate and House of Representatives passed Act No 2878, which abolished the Department of Mindanao and Sulu, and transferred its responsibilities to the Bureau of Non-Christian Tribes under the Department of the Interior. Muslim dissatisfaction grew as power shifted to the Christian Filipinos. Petitions were sent by Muslim leaders between 1921 and 1924, requesting that Mindanao and Sulu be administered directly by the United States. These petitions were not granted. Realising the futility of armed resistance, some Muslims sought to make the best of the situation. In 1934, Arolas Tulawi of Sulu, Datu Manandang Piang and Datu Blah Sinsuat of Cotabato, and Sultan Alaoya Alonto of Lanao were elected to the 1935 Constitutional Convention. In 1935, two Muslims were elected to the National Assembly.

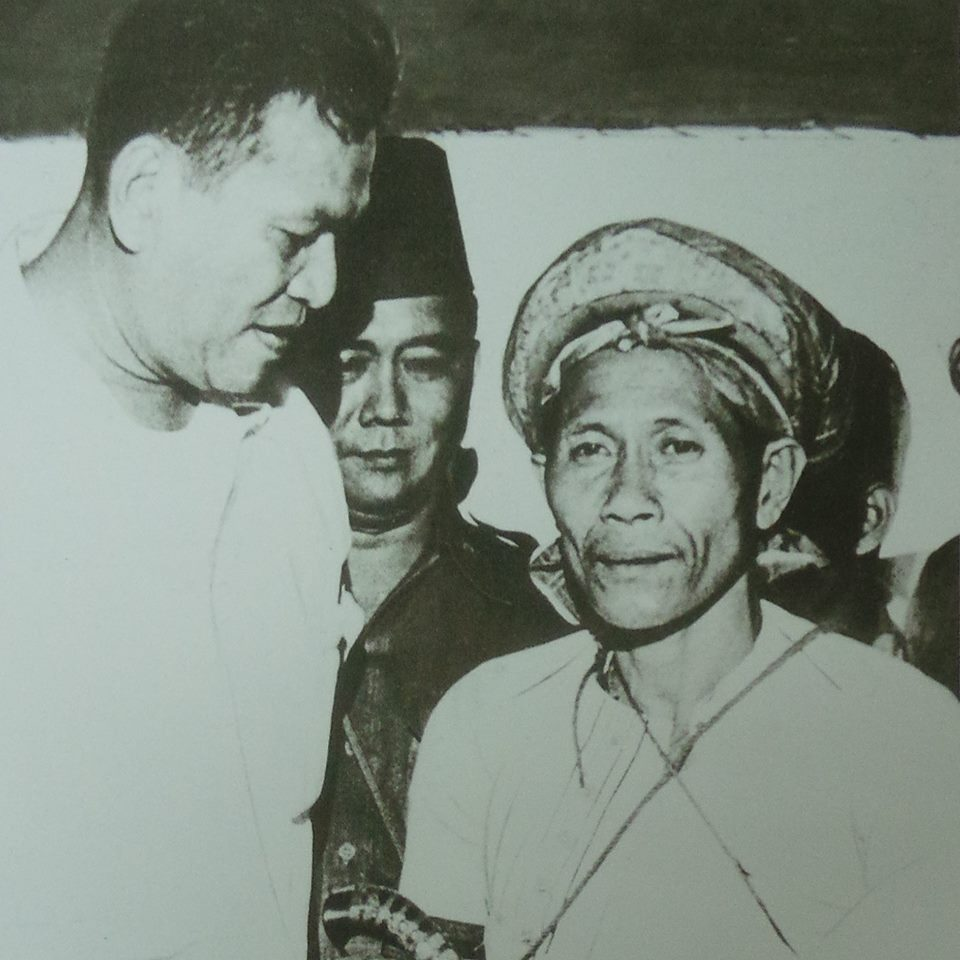
Datu Hadji Kamlon, a Tausūg freedom fighter who fought during World War II, and afterwards, staged his own uprising against the Philippine government.

The Tausūg in Sulu fought against the Japanese occupation of Mindanao and Sulu during World War II and eventually drove them out. The Commonwealth sought to end the privileges the Muslims had been enjoying under the earlier American administration. Muslim exemptions from some national laws, as expressed in the administrative code for Mindanao, and the Muslim right to use their traditional Islamic courts, as expressed in the Moro Board, were ended. It was unlikely that the Muslims, who have had a longer cultural history as Muslims than the Filipinos as Christians, would surrender their identity. This incident contributed to the rise of various separatist movements – the Muslim Independence Movement (MIM), Ansar El-Islam, and Union of Islamic Forces and Organizations (Che Man 1990:74–75).Founders of the Ansarul Islam were Capt.Kalingalan Caluang, Rashid Lucman, Salipada Pendatun, Domocao Alonto, Hamid Kamlian, Udtog Matalam, Atty. Macapantun Abbas Jr.In 1969, the Moro National Liberation Front (MNLF) was founded on the concept of a Bangsa Moro Republic by a group of educated young Muslims.The Chief Minister of Sabah by then was Tun Mustapha, he was like a brother and had good relations with Kalingalan “Apuh Inggal” Caluang. Through Tun Mustapha's help, the first fighters of MNLF(Like Al Hussein Caluang) were trained in Sabah after staying in Luuk, Sulu(which is now Kalingalan Caluang). Nur Misuari became a part of the Ansarul Islam because of his good reputation as a UP professor. After the training of these first MNLF fighters, Yahya Caluang(Son of Kalingalan “Apuh Inggal” Caluang) was asked by Kalingalan “Apuh Inggal” Caluang to fetch the MNLF fighters in Sabah. When Yahya Caluang arrived, Nur Misuari took over and declared himself Leader of the MNLF. Nur Misuari eventually asked forgiveness to Kalingalan “Apuh Inggal” Caluang and Apuh Inggal forgive him.

In 1976, negotiations between the Philippine government and the MNLF in Tripoli resulted in the Tripoli Agreement, which provided for an autonomous region in Mindanao. Nur Misuari was invited to chair the provisional government, but he refused. The referendum was boycotted by the Muslims themselves. The talks collapsed, and fighting continued. On 1 August 1989, Republic Act 673 or the Organic Act for Mindanao, created the Autonomous Region of Mindanao, which encompasses Maguindanao, Lanao del Sur, Sulu, and Tawi-Tawi.

==== Malaysia ====
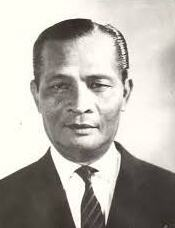
Mustapha Harun is the first governor of Sabah, who is of Tausūg-Bajau descent.

Most of the Tausugs in Malaysia have been living in part of Saba since the rule of the sultanate of Sulu. Some of them actually descendants of a Sulu princess (Dayang Dayang) who escaped from the Sulu sultan in the 1850s, when the sultan tried to take the princess as a wife although he already had many concubines. To differentiate themselves from the newly arrived Tausūg immigrants from the Philippines, most of them prefer to be called "Suluk".

However, more recent Tausug immigrants and refugees dating back to the 1970s Moro insurgency (the majority of them illegal immigrants) often face discrimination in Sabah. After the 2013 Lahad Datu standoff, there were reports of abuses by Malaysian authorities specifically on ethnic Tausug during crackdowns in Sandakan, even on Tausūg migrants with valid papers. Approximately nine thousand Filipino Tausūg were deported from January to November 2013.

== Demographics ==
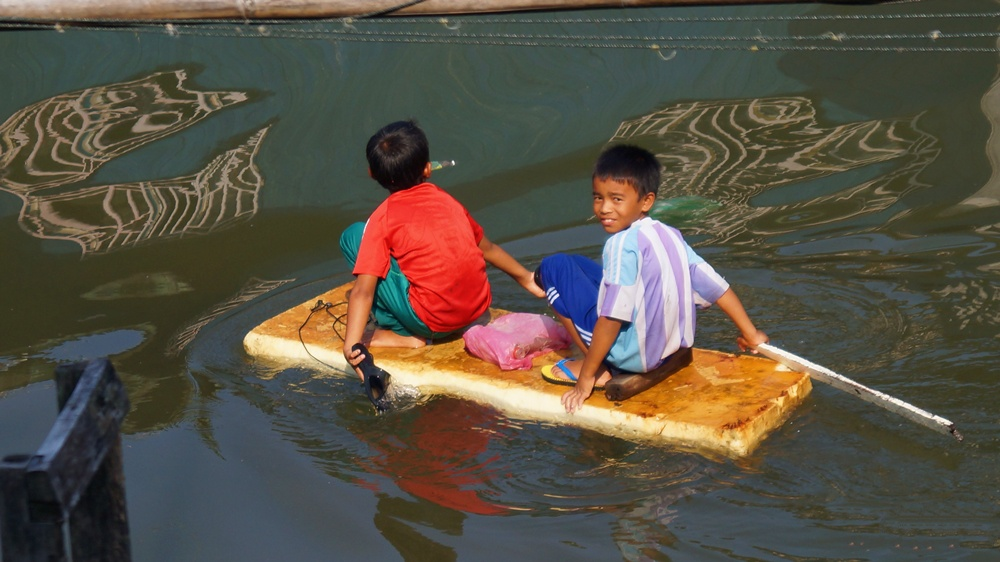
Tausūg refugee children on the water.

The Tausug number was of 1,226,601 in the Philippines in 2010. They populate the Filipino province of Sulu as a majority, and the provinces of Zamboanga del Sur, Zamboanga del Norte, Zamboanga Sibugay, Basilan, Tawi-Tawi, Palawan, Cebu, and Manila as minorities. Many Filipino-Tausūgs have found work in neighboring Sabah, Malaysia as construction labourers in search of better lives. However, many of them violate the law by overstaying illegally and are sometimes involved in criminal activities. The Filipino-Tausūgs are not recognized as a native to Sabah.

The Tausugs who have already been living natively in Sabah by the time of the Sulu or Tausug sultanate have settled in much of the eastern parts, from Kudat town in the north, to Tawau in the south east. They number around 300,000 and many of them have intermarried with other ethnic groups in Sabah, especially the Bajaus. Most prefer to use the Malay-language ethnonym Suluk in their birth certificates rather than the native Tausūg to distinguish themselves from their newly arrived Filipino relatives in Sabah. Migration fueled mainly from Sabah also created a substantial Suluk community in Greater Kuala Lumpur. While in Indonesia, most of the communities mainly settled in the northern area of North Kalimantan like Nunukan and Tarakan, which lies close to their traditional realm. There are around 12,000 (1981 estimate) Tausūg in Indonesia.

=== Religion ===
The overwhelming majority of Tausūgs follow Islam, as Islam has been a defining aspect of native Sulu culture ever since Islam spread to the southern Philippines. Being the first Filipinos to convert to Islam, They follow the traditional Sunni Shafi'i section of Islam, however they retain pre-Islamic religious practices and often practice a mix of Islam and Animism in their adat. A Christian minority exists. During the Spanish occupation, the presence of Jesuit missionaries in the Sulu Archipelago allowed for the conversion of entire families and even tribes and clans of Tausūgs, and other Sulu natives to Christianity. For example, Azim ud-Din I of Sulu, the 19th sultan of Sulu was converted to Christianity and baptized as Don Fernando de Alimuddin, however he reverted to Islam in his later life near death.

Some of the assimilated Filipino celebrities and politicians of Tausūg descent also tend to follow the Christian religion of the majority instead of the religion of their ancestors. For example, Maria Lourdes Sereno, the 24th Chief Justice of the Supreme Court of the Philippines is of patrilineal Tausūg descent is a born-again Christian. Singer Sitti is of Tausūg and Samal descent (she claims to be of Mapun heritage, also native to Sulu), is also a Christian.

The Tausug used to be Hindus before converting to Islam. Najeeb Saleeby described them as still retaining Hindu practices. Saleeby said the Moros were ignorant of Islamic tenets, barely prayed or went to the mosque and their juramentados were not fueled by religion but by nationalism against the occupying enemy.

Tausug retain pre-Islamic practices in the form of folk-Islam like the pagkaja and other palipalihan, as mentioned by Samuel K. Tan, some of these practices were allowed by the majority of the Ulama like the former Grand Mufti of Region 9 and Palawan Sayyiduna Shaykh AbdulGani Yusop since the Muslims in the Philippines were Ash'ari in Aqeeda, Shafi'i in Fiqh and practitioners of Sufism.

IAS/ UNOPS/UNFPA/IFAD representative Dr. P. V. Ramesh saw Professor Nur Misuari's MNLF in General Santos City perform Ramayana during a ceasefire agreement.

== Traditional political structure ==
The political structure of the Tausug is affected by the two economic divisions in the ethnic group, mainly parianon (people of the landing) and guimbahanon (hill people). Before the establishment of the sultanate of Sulu, the indigenous pre-Islamic Tausug were organized into various independent communities or community-states called banwa. When Islam arrived and the sultanate was established, the banwa was divided into districts administered by a panglima (mayor). The panglima are under the sultan (king). The people who held the stability of the community along with the sultan and the panglimas are the ruma bichura (state council advisers), datu raja muda (crown prince), datu maharaja adensuk (palace commander), datu ladladja laut (admiral), datu maharaja layla (commissioner of customs), datu amir bahar (speaker of the ruma bichara), datu tumagong (executive secretary), datu juhan (secretary of information), datu muluk bandarasa (secretary of commerce), datu sawajaan (secretary of interior), datu bandahala (secretary of finance), mamaneho (inspector general), datu sakandal (sultan's personal envoy), datu nay (ordinance or weapon commander), wazil (prime minister). A mangungubat (curer) also has special status in the community as they are believed to have direct contact with the spiritual realm.

The community's people is divided into three classes, which are the nobility (the sultan's family and court), commoners (the free people), and the slaves (war captives, sold into slavery, or children of slaves).

== Languages ==
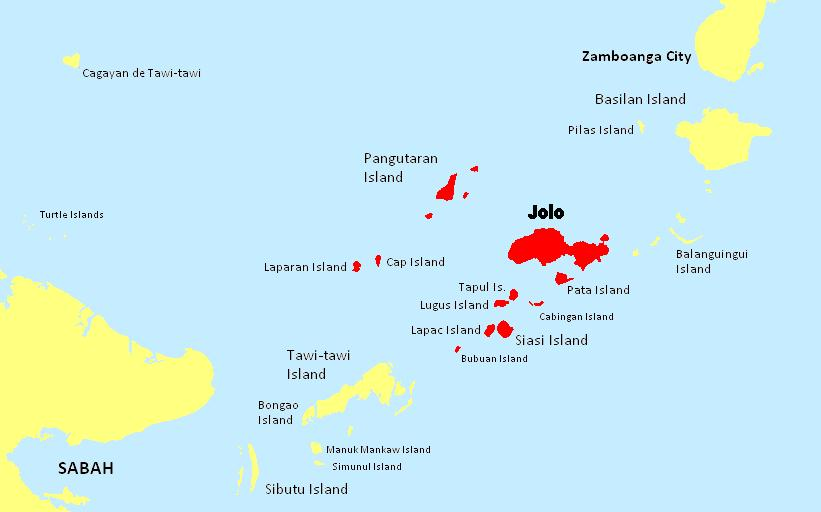
A map of the Sulu Archipelago showing the areas in which Tausug is the primary and secondary language spoken.

The Tausug language is called "Sinug" with "Bahasa" to mean Language. The Tausug language is related to Bicolano, Tagalog and Visayan languages, being especially closely related to the Surigaonon language of the provinces Surigao del Norte, Surigao del Sur and Agusan del Sur and the Butuanon language of northeastern Mindanao specially the root Tausug words without the influence of the Arabic language, sharing many common words. The Tausūg, however, do not consider themselves as Visayan, using the term only to refer to Christian Bisayan-language speakers, given that the vast majority of Tausūgs are Muslims in contrast to its very closely related Surigaonon brothers which are predominantly Roman Catholics. Tausug is also related to the Waray-Waray language. Aside from Tagalog (which is spoken throughout the country), a number of Tausug can also speak Zamboangueño Chavacano (especially those residing in Zamboanga City), and other Visayan languages (especially Cebuano language because of the mass influx of Cebuano migrants to Mindanao); Malay in the Philippines, Malaysia and Indonesia; and English in both Malaysia and Philippines as second languages.

Malaysian Tausūg, descendants of residents when the Sulu Sultanate ruled the eastern part of Sabah, speak or understand the Sabahan dialect of Suluk, Malaysian language, and some English or Sinama (those who come in regular contact with the Bajau also speak Bajau dialects). By the year 2000, most of the Tausūg children in Sabah, especially in towns of the west side of Sabah, were no longer speaking Tausūg; instead they speak the Sabahan dialect of Malay and English.

Indonesian Tausūg on the other hand, are descendants of residents when the Sultanate of Bulungan, a vassal state of the Sulu Sultanate, also ruled the southeastern part of Sabah (Tawau) and the Indonesian province of North Kalimantan (northeastern portion), also speak or understand the Nunukan dialect of Suluk, Indonesian language (including colloquial variant) and as well as the regional slang. At the same time, they can also understand and speak the Suluk dialect spoken in Sabah as well as Sabah Malay.

English	Tausug	Surigaonon	Cebuano
What is your name?	Hisiyu in ngān mu?	Unu an ngayan mu?	Unsa'y ngalan nimo?
My name is Muhammad	In ngān ku Muhammad	An ngayan ku ay Muhammad	Ang ngalan nako ay Muhammad
How are you?	Maunu-unu nakaw?	Ya-unu nakaw?	Kumusta ka?
I am fine, [too]	Marayaw da [isab]	Madayaw da [isab] aku (Tandaganon)/Marajaw da [isab] aku (Surigaonon)	Maayo da/ra [usab] 'ko
Where is Ahmad?	Hawnu hi Ahmad?	Hain si Ahmad?	Asa si Ahmad?
He is in the house	Ha bāy siya	Sa bay siya/sija	Sa balay siya
Thank you	Magsukul	Salamat	Salamat
‘I am staying at’ or ‘I live at’	Naghuhula’ aku ha	Yaghuya aku sa	Nagpuyo ako sa
I am here at the house.	Yari aku ha bay.	Yadi aku sa bayay.	Dia ra ko sa balay.
I am Hungry.	Hiyapdi' aku.	In-gutom aku.	Gi-gutom ku.
He is there, at school.	Yadtu siya ha iskul.	Yadtu siya/sija sa iskul.	Atoa siya sa tunghaan/skwelahan
Fish	Ista'	Isda	Isda/ita
Leg	Siki	Siki	Tiil
Hand	Lima	Alima	kamut
Person	Tau	Tau	Taw/tawo
(Sea/River) current	Sūg	Sūg	Sūg/Sulog
Fire	Kāyu	Kayajo	Kalayo
Shrimp/Prawn	Ullang	Uyang	Pasayan
Ear	Taynga	Talinga	Dalunggan
Face	Bayhu'	Wayong	Nawong
Rain	Ulan	Uyan	Ulan
Morning	Mahinaat/Maynat	Buntag	Buntag
Mosquito	Hilam	Hilam	Lamok
House/Home	Bāy	Bayay	Balay
Dog	Iru'	Ido	Iro
Year	Tahun	Tuig	Tuig
Month/Moon	Bulan	Buyan	Bulan
Male/Man/Lad	Usug	Layaki	Lalaki/Laki
Now	Bihaun	Kuman	Karon
Far/Distant	Malayu'	Lajo	Layo
Sleep	Tūg	Tuyog	Tulog
Sea Urchin	Tayum	Tajum	Tuyom
Medicine	Ubat	Tambay	Tambal
Shame	Sipug	Sipog	Ulaw/Kaulaw
Male genitalia	Utin	Utin	Utin
Heat	Pasu'	Paso	Init/Kaigang
Nice	Malingkat	Kagana	Nindot
I don't know/think so	Inday	Inday	Ambot
Don't (imperative)	Ayaw	Jagot	Ayaw
Rust	Gaha'	Kalaying	Taya
Knowledgeable	Maingat	Hibayo	Kahibawo/Kahibalo
Come in/Enter	Sūd	Dayon	Sulod
Butt/Buttocks	Buli'	Labot	Lubot
Underarms	Iluk	Ilok	Ilok
Flower	Sumping	Buyak	Bulak
Widow	Balu	Bayo	Balo
Mouse/Rat	Ambaw	Ambaw	Ilaga
Cow	Sapi'	Baka	Baka
Thunder	Dawgdug	Dayugdog	Dalugdog
Rich	Dayahan	Datu	Kwartahan/Dato
Gay/Effeminate/Homosexual	Bantut	Bayot	Bayot
Cat	Kuting	Miya	Iring
Said	Lawng	Laong	Ingon
Ugly	Mangi'	Kayaot	Bati
Right	Amu	Amo	Mao
Separated	Butas	Buyag	Bulag
Gold	Bulawan	Bujawan	Bolawan
Lanzones/Langsat (Lansium domesticum)	Buwahan	Buwahan	Buwahan
Sweat	Hulas	Huyas	Singot
Road/Path/Way	Dān	Dayan	Dalan
Money	Sīn/Pilak	Puya	Kwarta
Woman	Babai	Babaje/Baje	Babaye/Baye
Turn	Biluk	Bijok/Liso	Tuyok
Dress	Badju'	Baro	Sanina/Bado
Elderly	Maas	Tiguyang	Tigulang
If	Bang	Kun	Kung/Kon
Spices	Pamāpa	Jaman	Lamas
Bamboo	Patung/Kayawan	Kawajan	Kawayan
Climb	Dāg	Kayatkat	Katkat
Walk	Panaw	Panaw	Lakaw
Relatives	Anak kampung	Lumon	Parinte
Go outside	Guwa'	Lugwa	Gawas
Dirty	Malummi'	Lipa	Hugaw
Go with	Iban	Iban	Uban
Different	Dugaing/Kandī	Kala-in	Lain
Airplane/Aircraft	Ariplanu/Passawat/Kappal lupad/Kappal Tarbang	Idro	Eroplano
Car/Automobile	Awtu/Karita'/Mubil	Awto	Awto
Husband	Bana	Bana	Bana
Technician/Repair crew	Magdarayaw	Mandajaway	Mang-ayuhay
Aim/Purpose/Intention	Maksud	Tujo	Tuyo
Drunk	Hilu	Bayong	Hubog
Dove/Pigeon	Assang/Mapāti	Kayapati	Kalapati
Tiger	Halimaw	Tigre	Tigre

== Cultures ==
Tausūgs are superb warriors and craftsmen. They are known for the Pangalay dance (also known as Daling-Daling in Sabah), in which female dancers wear artificial elongated fingernails made from brass or silver known as janggay, and perform motions based on the Vidhyadhari (Bahasa Sūg: Bidadali) of pre-Islamic Buddhist legend. The Tausug are also well known for their pis syabit, a multi-colored woven cloth traditionally worn as a headress or accessory by men. Nowadays, the pis syabit is also worn by women and students. In 2011, the pis syabit was cited by the National Commission for Culture and the Arts as one of the intangible cultural heritage of the Philippines under the traditional craftsmanship category that the government may nominate in the UNESCO Intangible Cultural Heritage Lists. The Tausug are additionally associated with tagonggo, a traditional type of kulingtang music.

Both cross cousin marriage and paternal parallel cousin marriage are practiced by Tausug Moro Muslims.

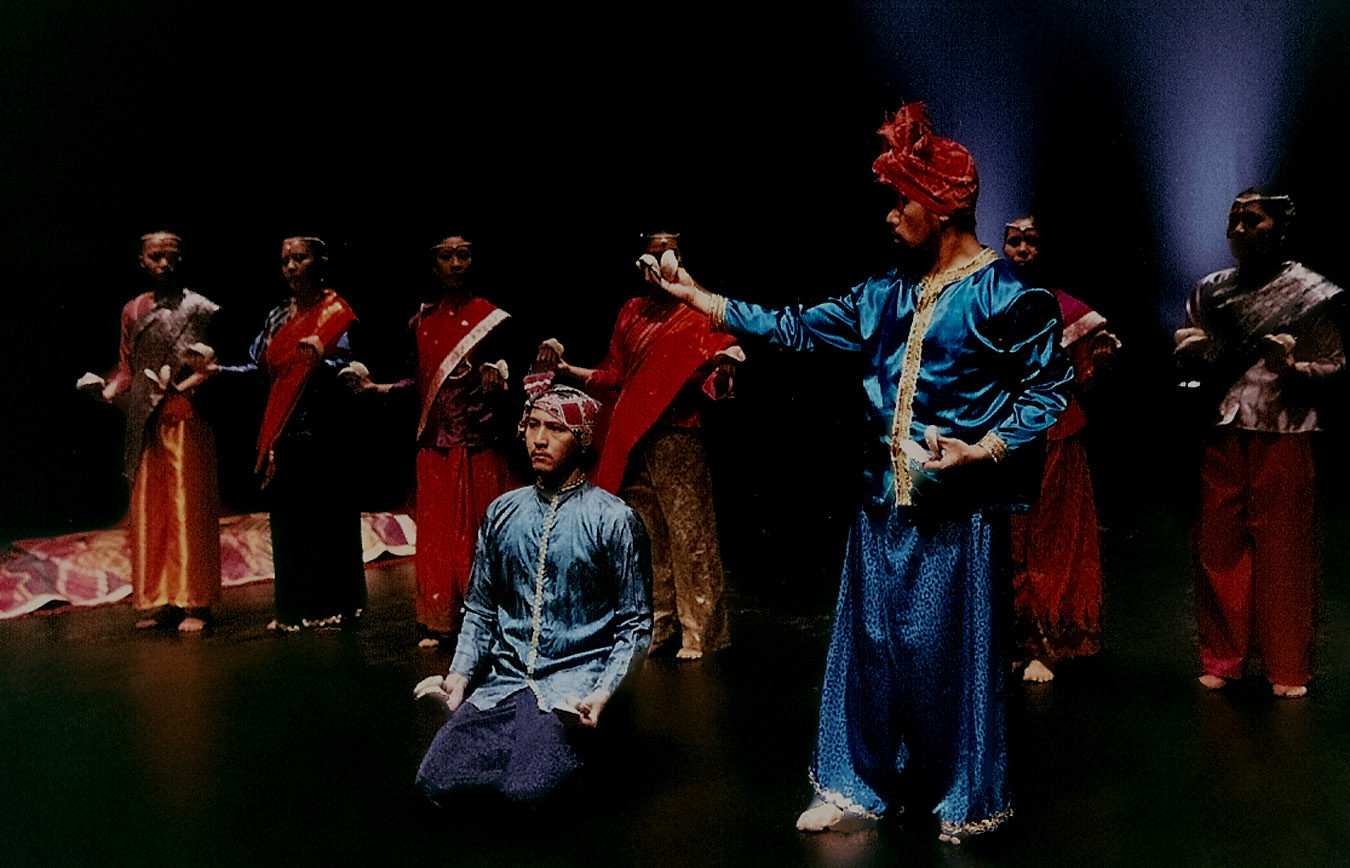
Filipino-Americans from NYC-based dance company Kinding Sindaw dressed in Tausug attire.

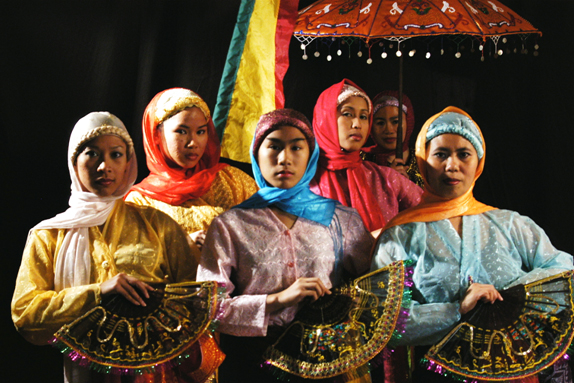
Filipino-Americans from NYC-based dance company Kinding Sindaw dressed for a traditional Maranao, not Tausug, fan dance.

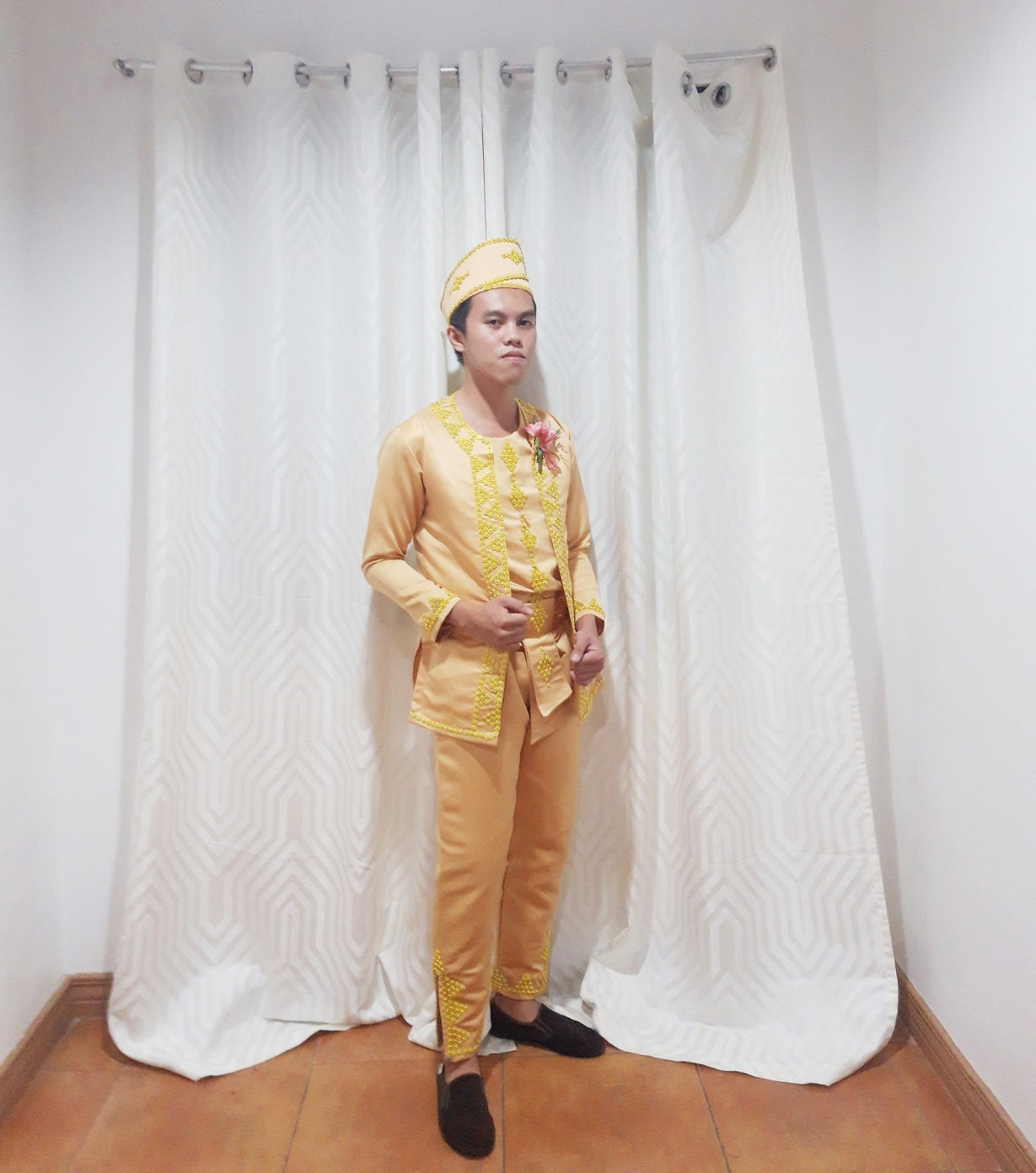
A Tausug man wearing traditional attire that consists of badjuh lapih (upper) and kupat (pants).

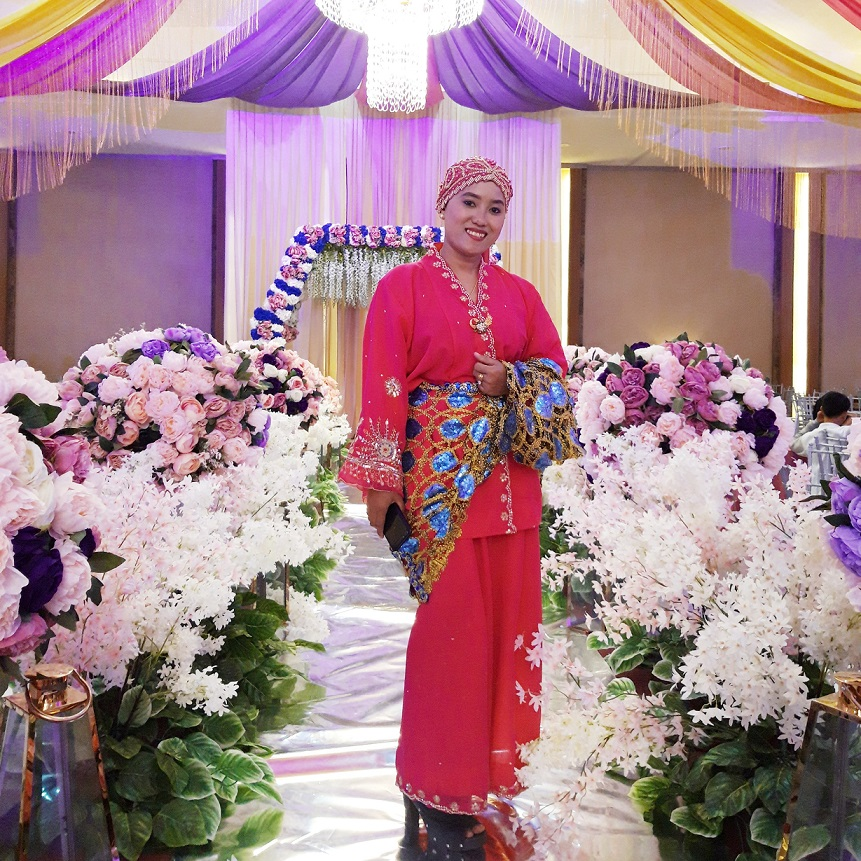
A Tausug woman wearing a sablay.

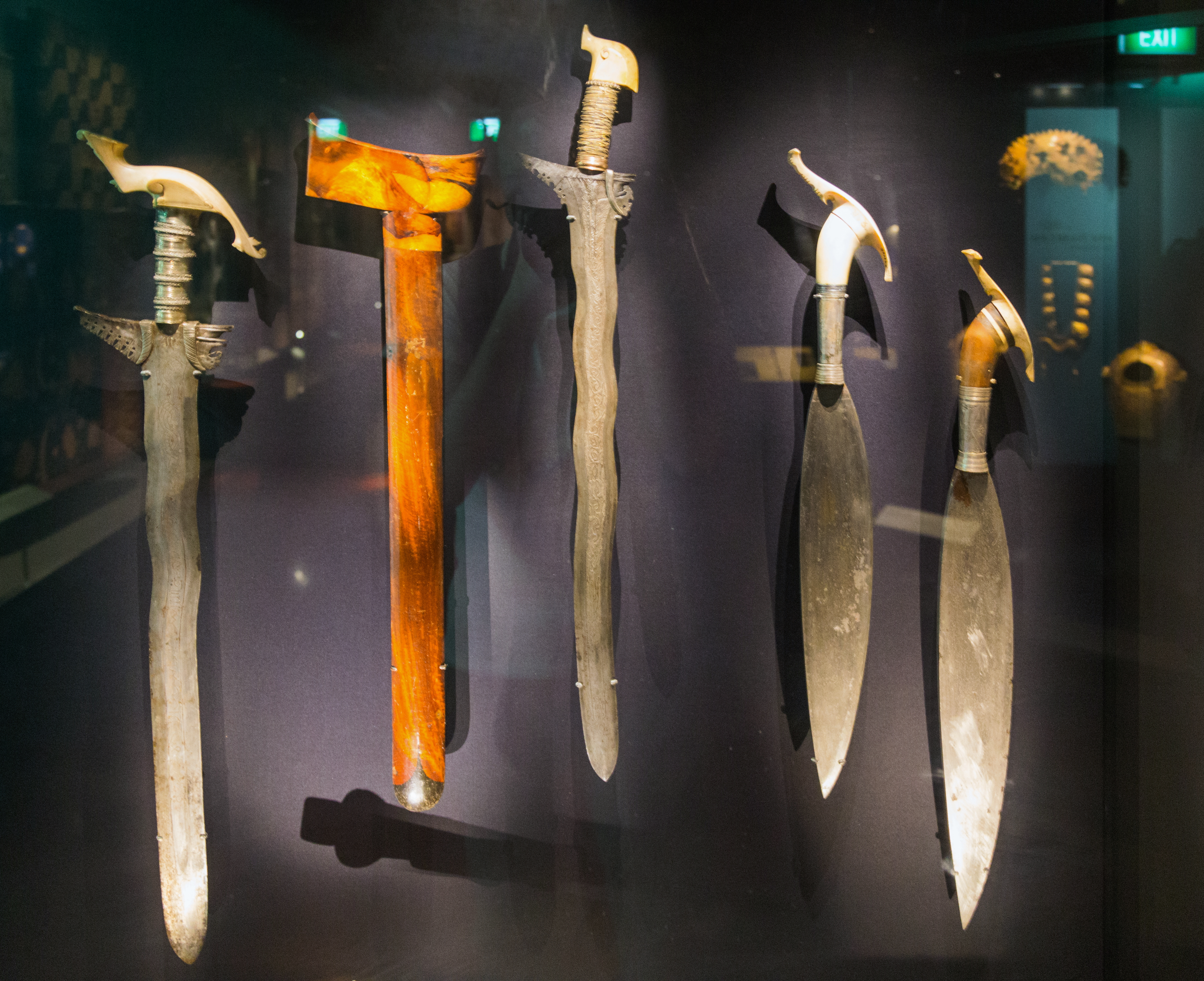
The most common Tausūg weapons: the kalis and the barong with the characteristic Tausūg kakatua (cockatoo) pommel design

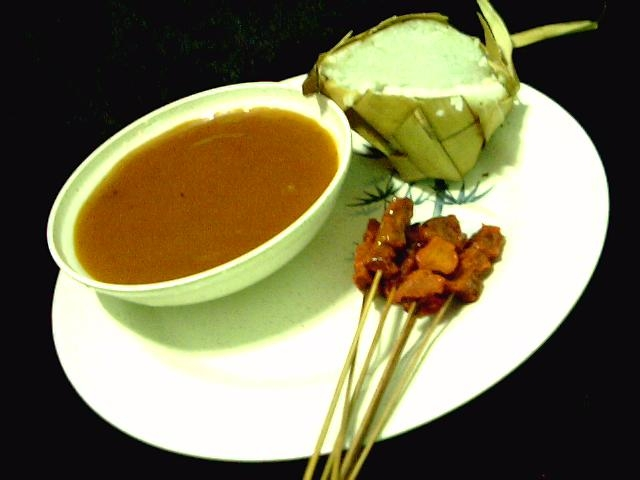
Tausūg Satti served with peanut soup and Ta'mu rice cakes wrapped in coconut leaves.

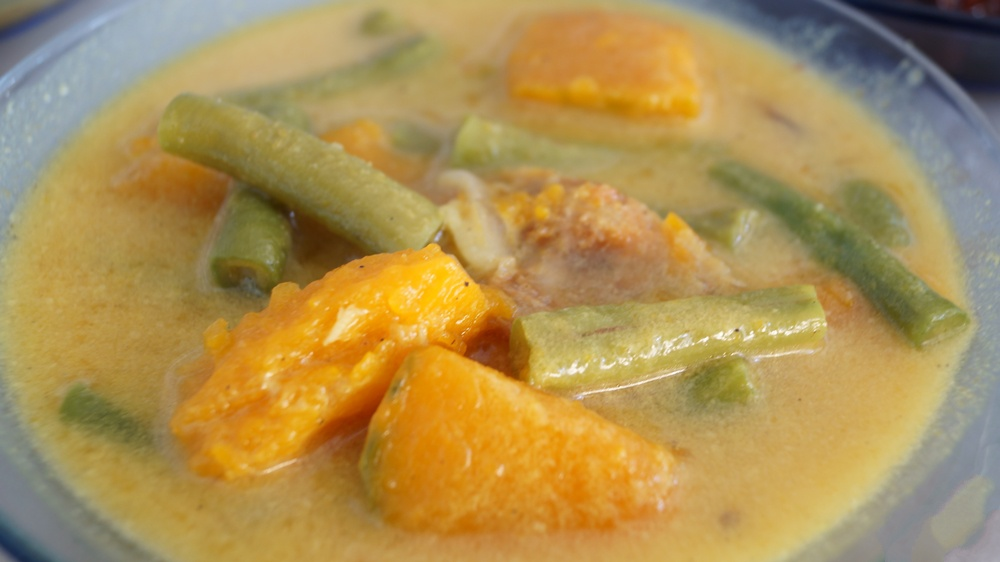
Kabasi, a Tausūg dish.

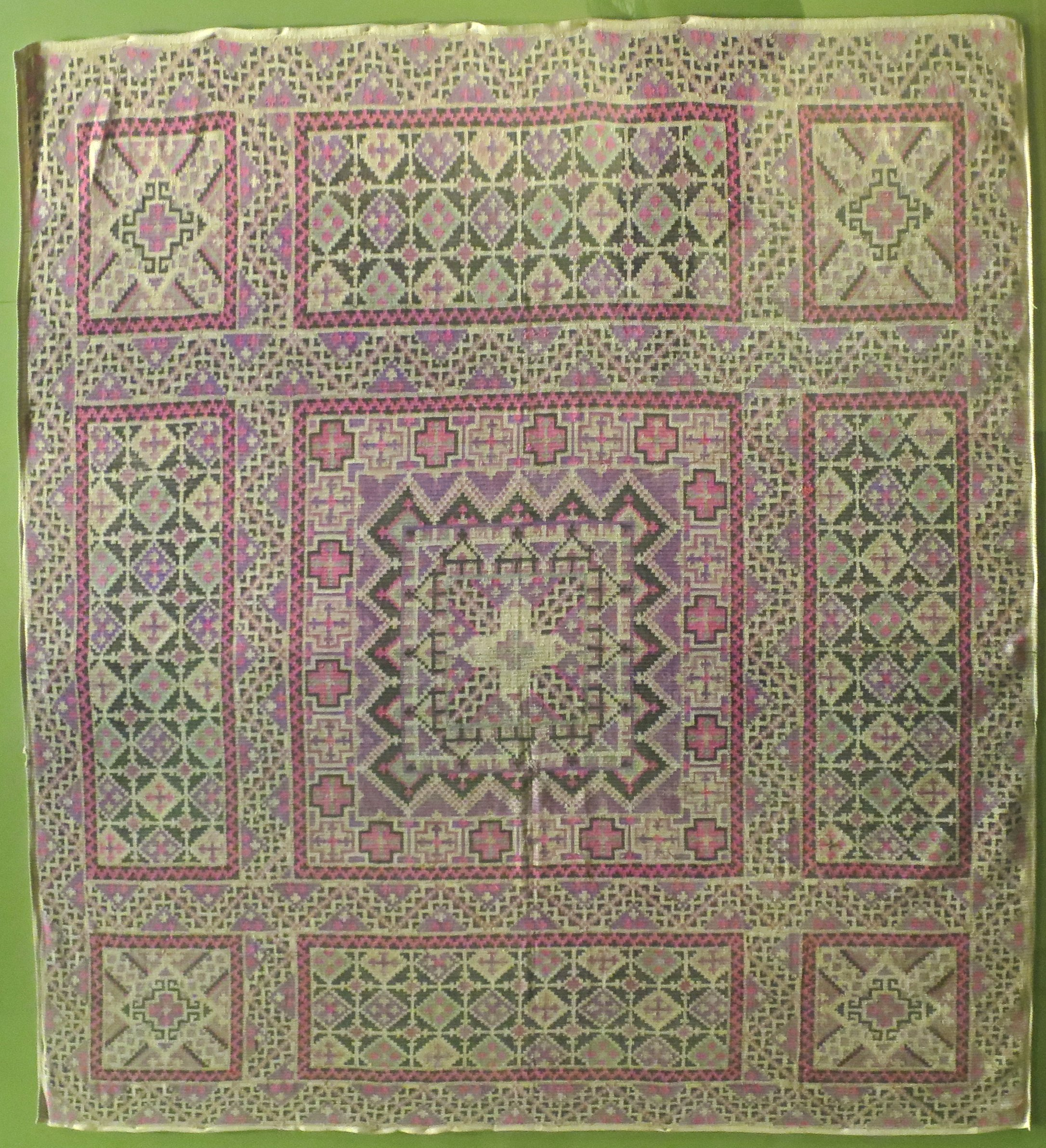
Pis siyabit (headscarf) of the Tausūgs, displayed at the Honolulu Museum of Art.

== Notable Tausūgs ==
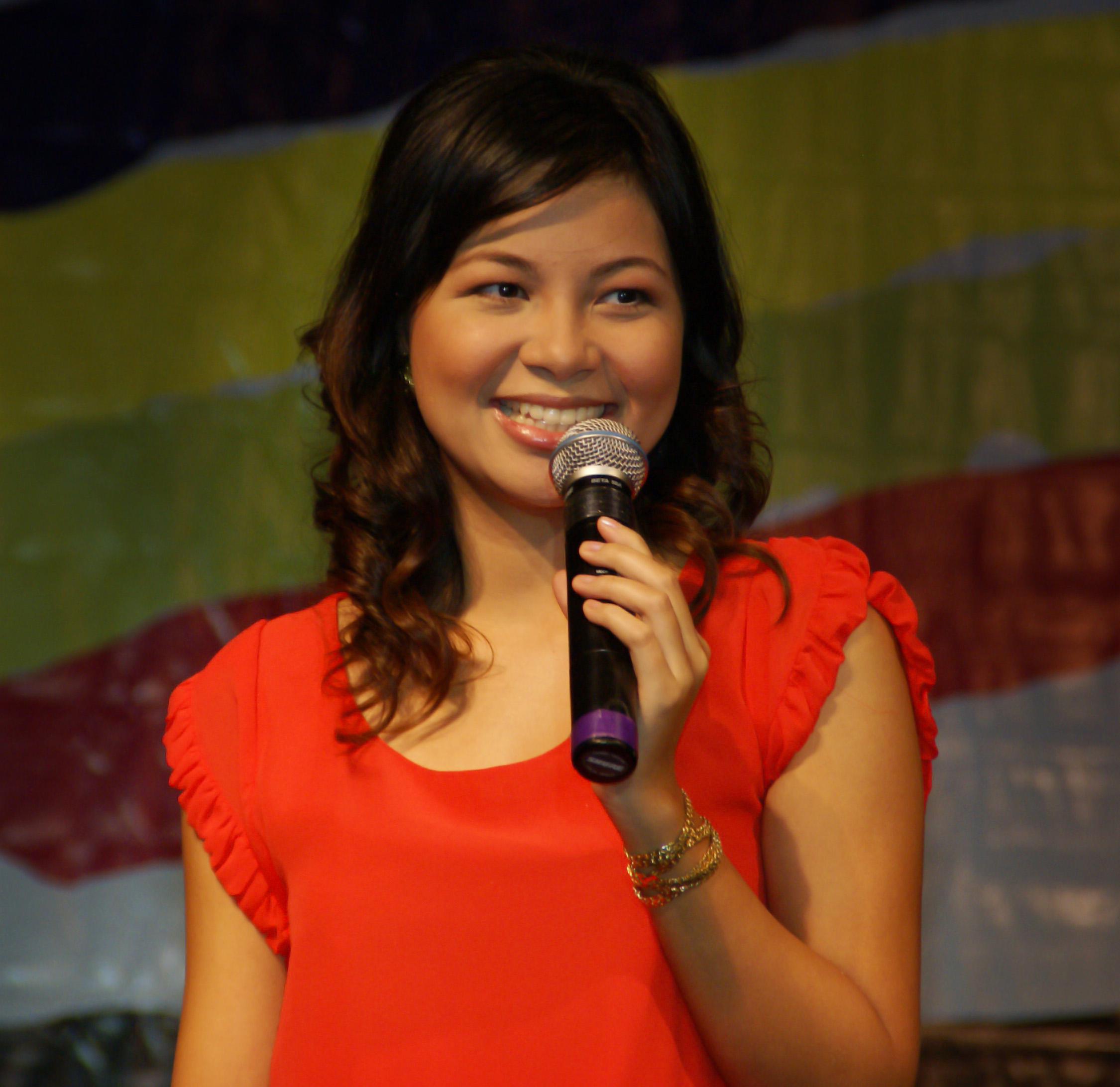
Sitti Navarro, a Filipino singer of Tausūg and Sama descent, performing at the US-Philippine Expo in Pomona, California.

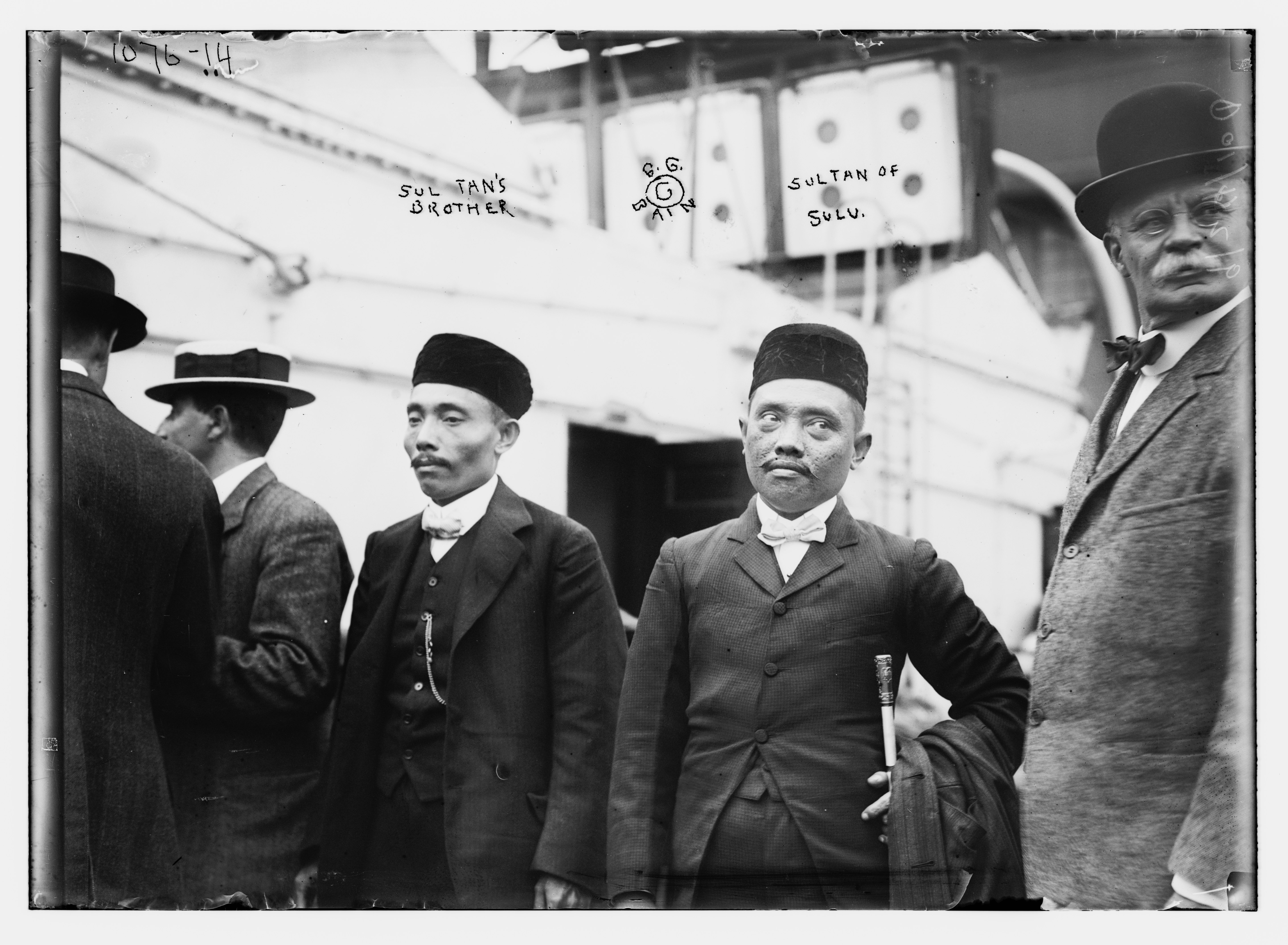
Sultan Jamalul Kiram II with his brother, published by Bain News Service

- Santanina T. Rasul, first Filipino Muslim woman senator.
- Muedzul Lail Tan Kiram, claimant to the sultanate
- Nur Misuari, former Filipino governor and became the leader of the Moro National Liberation Front.
- Hadji Kamlon, freedom fighter
- Panglima Bandahala, trusted adviser and close relative of the Sultan Jamalul Kiram II, he held significant positions such as Municipal President and peace emissary
- Sayyid Captain Kalingalan "Apuh Inggal" Caluang, son of Caluang son of Panglima Bandahala son of Sattiya Munuh son of Sayyid Qasim, one of the Fighting 21 of Sulu. he was one of the founders of Ansar El Islam (Helpers of Islam) along with Domocao Alonto, Rashid Lucman, Salipada Pendatun, Hamid Kamlian, Udtog Matalam, and Atty. Macapantun Abbas Jr. Accordingly, "it is a mass movement for the preservation and development of Islam in the Philippines".
- Jamalul Kiram III, claimant to the sultanate
- Ismael Kiram II, descendant Filipino sultan.
- Mat Salleh (Datu Muhammad Salleh), Sabah warrior from Inanam who led the Mat Salleh Rebellion until his death.
- Tun Datu Mustapha (Tun Datu Mustapha bin Datu Harun), first Yang di-Pertua Negeri (Governor) of Sabah and third Chief Minister of Sabah.
- Juhar Mahiruddin, tenth Yang di-Pertua Negeri (Governor) of Sabah (also partial Kadazan-Dusun ethnic ancestry).
- Shafie Apdal, fifteenth Chief Minister of Sabah.
- Sitti, Filipino singer.
- Abdusakur Mahail Tan, Governor of Sulu.
- Miguel "Miggy" Cabel Moreno, Chef and Cultural Advocate
- Maria Lourdes Sereno, 24th Chief Justice of the Supreme Court of the Philippines.
- Darhata Sawabi, Filipino weaver known for pis syabit, a traditional Tausūg cloth tapestry. She is a recipient of the Philippine National Living Treasures Award.
- Yong Muhajil, YouTube vlogger and 3rd runner up in Pinoy Big Brother: Lucky 7.
- Omar Musa, author, poet, and rapper.
- Abdurajak Abubakar Janjalani, Jihadist leader and founder of Abu Sayyaf (also partial Ilonggo ethnic ancestry).
- Khadaffy Janjalani, Jihadist and leader of Abu Sayyaf. He was a younger brother of Abdurajak Abubakar Janjalani.
- Jainal Antel Sali Jr., Senior leader of Abu Sayyaf.
- Albader Parad, Senior leader of Abu Sayyaf.
- Hajan Sawadjaan, Leader of Abu Sayyaf.
- Radullan Sahiron, Leader of Abu Sayyaf.
- Hussin Ututalum Amin, mayor of Jolo.
- Mohammad Mahakuttah Abdullah Kiram, legitimate 34th Sultan of Sulu and father of Muedzul Lail Tan Kiram.

== See also ==
- Tausug language
- Sulu Archipelago
- Province of Sulu
- Sultanate of Sulu
- Ethnic groups in the Philippines
- Moro peoples of the Philippines
  - Sulu:
    - Yakan people
    - Bajau people
  - Mindanao:
    - Maranao people
    - Iranun people
    - Maguindanao people
- Visayan peoples
  - Butuanon people
  - Surigaonon people
  - Sheikh Karimul Makhdum Mosque

== Sources ==
- Abinales, P. N.; Amoroso, Donna J. (2005). State and Society in the Philippines. Rowman & Littlefield. pp. 43–45. ISBN 978-0-7425-1024-1.
- Donoso, Isaac (2022). "The Qur'an in the Spanish Philippines". In García-Arenal, Mercedes; Wiegers, Gerard (eds.). The Iberian Qur'an: From the Middle Ages to Modern Times. De Gruyter. pp. 499–532. doi:10.1515/9783110778847-019. hdl:10045/139165. ISBN 978-3-11-077884-7.
- Gonda, Jan (1975), Religionen: Handbuch der Orientalistik: Indonesien, Malaysia und die Philippinen unter Einschluss der Kap-Malaien in Südafrika, vol. 2, E.J. Brill, ISBN 978-90-04-04330-5
- Gunn, Geoffrey C. (2011). History Without Borders: The Making of an Asian World Region, 1000–1800. Hong Kong University Press. pp. 91–95. ISBN 9789888083343.
- Larousse, William (2001), A Local Church Living for Dialogue: Muslim-Christian Relations in Mindanao-Sulu, Philippines : 1965–2000, Editrice Pontificia Università Gregoriana, ISBN 978-88-7652-879-8
- Saleeby, Najeeb Mitry (1908), The History of Sulu, Bureau of Printing
