= Linat-an =

Filipino stew or soup made from pork or beef with various vegetables

- Alternative names: Nilat-an, Linat-ang baboy, Linat-an na baboy, Nilat-ang baboy, Nilat-an na baboy
- Type: Stew/Soup
- Place of origin: Philippines
- Region or state: Visayas, Mindanao
- Similar dishes: Nilaga, Bulalo, Lauya, Cansi

Linat-an, also known as nilat-an, is a traditional pork stew from the Visayas and Mindanao islands of the Philippines. Linat-an characteristically uses pork ribs (or other bony cuts of pork) boiled and simmered until very tender, lemongrass (tanglad), string beans, and starchy ingredients for a thicker soup (usually taro). Like the very similar nilagang baboy, the rest of its ingredients can vary, but they typically include chayote, water spinach, onion, garlic, pechay, calabaza, and bell peppers. It is seasoned with salt, ground black pepper, and fish sauce to taste.

The name "linat-an" literally means "boiled until very tender". It can also be used generally to refer to other types of stews, including those made with beef or chicken.

== See also ==
- Nilaga
- Bulalo
- Cansi
- Sinigang
- Kadyos, baboy, kag langka
- List of stews
- List of soups
