= Nilaga =

Filipino stew or soup made from pork or beef with various vegetables

Nilagà
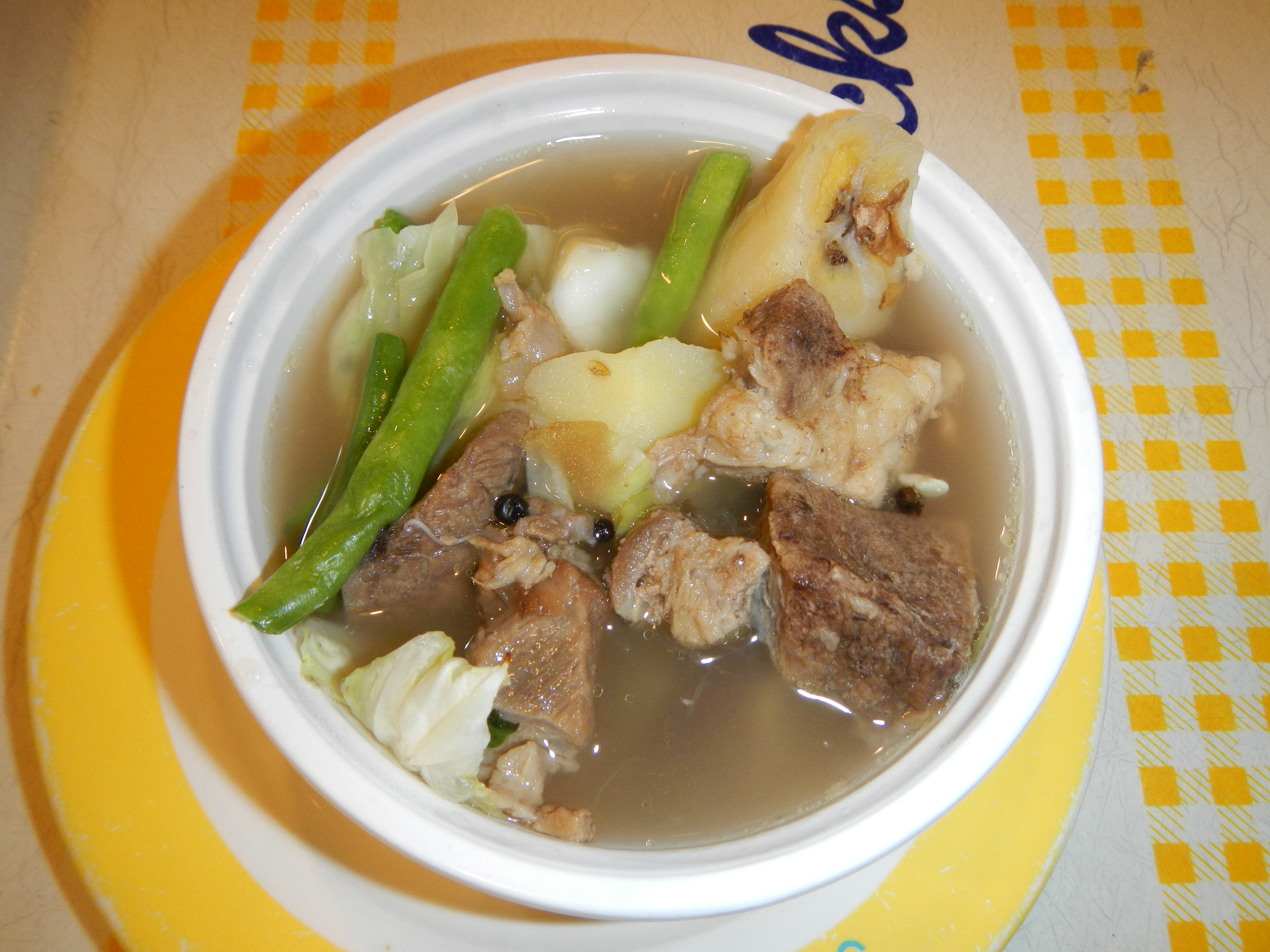
- Nilagang baboy with string beans, pechay, potatoes, and saba bananas
- Type: Stew/Soup
- Place of origin: Philippines
- Region or state: Tagalog Region
- Similar dishes: Bulalo, Lauya, Cansi

Nilaga (also written as nilagà) is a traditional meat stew or soup from the Philippines, made with boiled beef (nilagang baka) or pork (nilagang baboy) mixed with various vegetables such as sweet corn, potatoes, kale, string beans, cabbage and bok choy. It is typically eaten with white rice and is served with soy sauce, patis (fish sauce), labuyo chilis, and calamansi on the side.

== Description ==
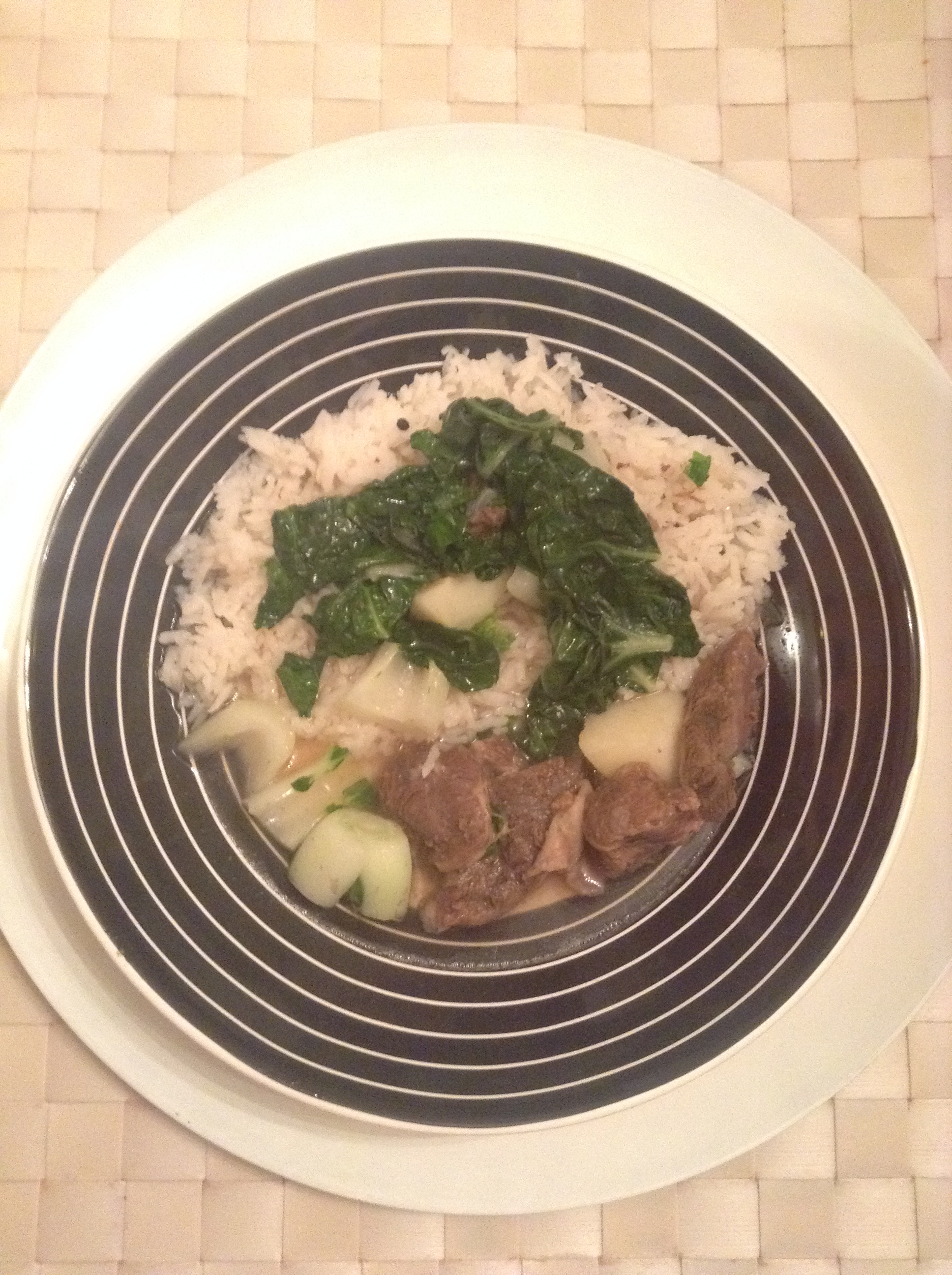
Nilagang baka over white rice

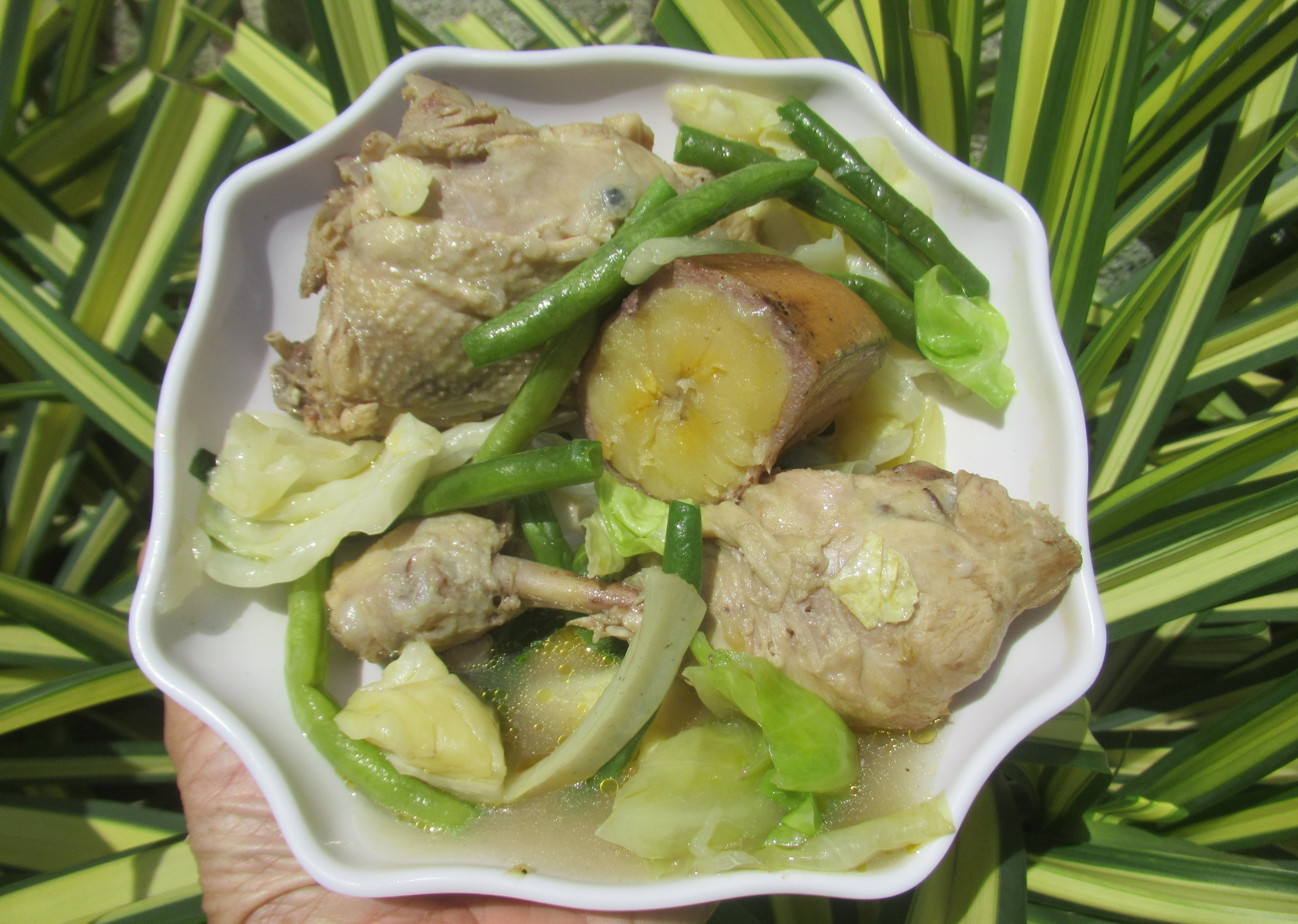
Nilagang manok

Nilaga is one of the simplest dishes in the Philippines. It typically uses tender and fatty cuts of meat like sirloin, pork belly, ribs or brisket. These are boiled until fork-tender then spiced with onions, garlic, salt, whole black peppercorns, scallions, patis (fish sauce), and sometimes lemongrass, ginger, star anise, or bay leaves. The broth is also commonly enriched with bouillon cubes. Various vegetables are then added with the dish. The most basic vegetables used are pechay (or cabbage) and potatoes. Other vegetables that can be used include carrots, saba bananas, calabaza, string beans, tomatoes, celery, broccoli, cauliflower, chayote, corn on the cob, baby corn, bell peppers, and sweet potatoes, among others.

Nilaga can be eaten on its own, but it is typically eaten with white rice. It is served with soy sauce, patis (fish sauce), labuyo chilis, and calamansi on the side, which can be added to taste.

== Similar dishes ==
Chicken or seafood versions of the dish are usually called tinola. Nilaga is very similar to other dishes like bulalo, linat-an, lauya, and cansi. Nilaga can be distinguished in that it has a broth (bouillon) base, made with tender meaty and fatty cuts of beef or pork. The other dishes have a stock base, made by using bone marrow and collagen-rich cuts of beef and pork (like beef shank and ham hocks).

"Nilaga" (which means "boiled" in Tagalog) is also used for other unrelated dishes like boiled peanuts, corn on the cob, or saba bananas.

== See also ==
- Lauya
- Linat-an
- Bulalo
- Cansi
- Sinigang
- Cocido
- List of stews
- List of soups
