= Kadyos, manok, kag ubad =

Filipino chicken soup

- Alternative names: "Kadyos, manok, at ubad", KMU, "Manok at kadyos"
- Type: Soup or stew
- Course: Main course
- Place of origin: Philippines
- Region or state: Western Visayas
- Serving temperature: Hot
- Main ingredients: Chicken, pigeon peas, banana pith, batuan
- Similar dishes: Kadyos, baboy, kag langka, kansi, sinigang, paksiw

Kadyos, manok, kag ubad, commonly shortened to KMU, is a Filipino chicken soup or stew originating from the Hiligaynon people of the Western Visayas islands. The name of the dish means "pigeon peas, chicken, and banana pith"; the three main ingredients. It is similar to another Hiligayon dish, Kadyos, baboy, kag langka ("KBL"), except that it does not use a souring agent, and it uses chicken and banana pith (ubad, not to be confused with ubod which is heart of palm) instead. Like KBL, KMU is also characteristically purple in color due to the use of pigeon peas. Other ingredients include onions, lemongrass, thinly sliced ginger, siling haba pepper, and salt and pepper.

== See also ==
- Cansi
- Filipino cuisine
- List of soups
- List of stews
