= Lauya =

Ilocano (Filipino) stew of pork or beef

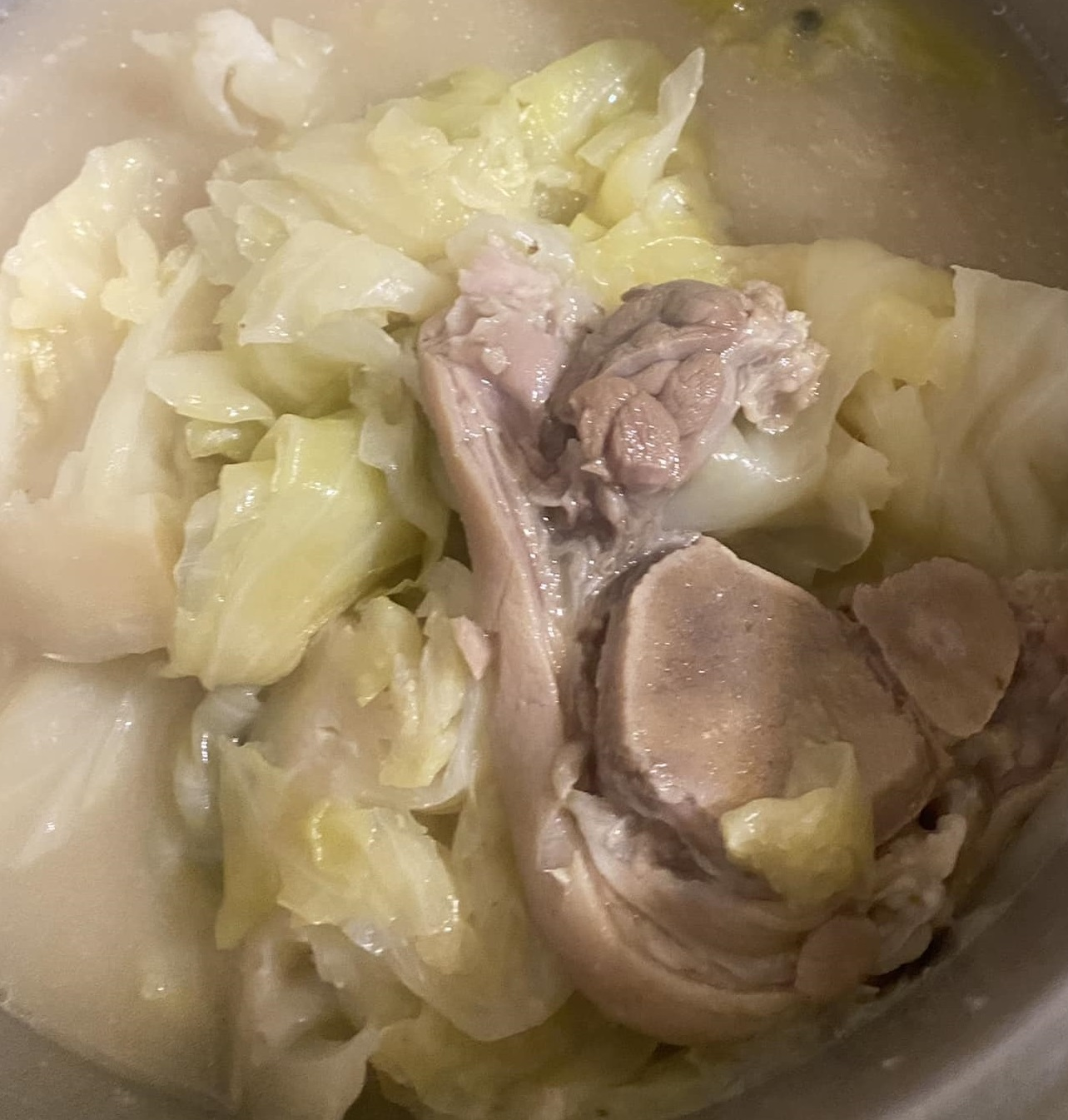
- Pork stew with potatoes and cabbage
- Alternative names: La'uya, laoya
- Course: Main course
- Place of origin: Philippines
- Region or state: Ilocos region
- Serving temperature: Hot
- Main ingredients: Beef or pork
- Ingredients generally used: Ginger, garlic, vinegar, bay leaves, peppercorns, potatoes, chayote, green papaya, cabbage, bak choy, mustard cabbage
- Variations: Chicken, carabao

Lauya /ˈlɑːuːjɑː/ is a Filipino stew. Its name is derived from the Spanish-Filipino term "la olla" (lit. "the ceramic pot"), likely referring to the native clay pots (banga) in which stews were made in. It is now often associated with the Ilocano stew typically made with pork or beef. The term is sometimes used in Ilonggo cuisine.

Like many other Filipino dishes, this savory dish is often paired with a side of cooked rice.

== Ingredients ==
=== Meats ===
Ilocano lauya is characterized by its simplicity and few ingredients, a product of Ilocano resourcefulness. Historically, Ilocanos were typically given the less desirable cuts of bony meats during the Spanish colonial period. Today, various cuts of pork or beef may be used including: pigs feet, ham hock, pork butt, spare ribs, short ribs, shank, oxtail, chuck steak, and brisket. Chicken and carabao can also be used. The meats are cut into larger chunks in order to be simmered and braised for a longer period.

=== Vegetables ===
Very few vegetables garnish Ilocano lauya, often limited to one or two choices. Stews containing pork and beef may be accompanied by potatoes and cabbage. Chayote and green papaya can be used in stews containing pork or chicken. Bak choy or mustard greens can substitute for cabbage in beef stews while the leaves of moringa, bittermelon, and chili peppers are favored in chicken stews.

=== Seasonings ===
A subtle amount of vinegar is commonly added to the braising liquid to limit the gaminess of the meat rather than as a souring agent. Salt is used along with a small amount of fish sauce and soy sauce, in addition to whole or coarsely ground peppercorns. Ginger is used in beef and chicken stews, while pork stews uses garlic. Bay leaves are optionally added to pork and chicken stews when leafy greens are not added.

== See also ==
- Bulalo – Beef dish from the Philippines
- Kadyos, baboy, kag langka – Filipino pork soup
- Nilaga – Filipino stew or soup made from pork or beef with various vegetables
- Nikujaga – Japanese meat and potato dish
- Pot-au-feu – French beef stew
- Puchero – Spanish and South American stew
- Sancocho – Traditional soup in several Latin American cuisines
- Sinigang – Filipino sour soup
- Tinola – Filipino soup dish of chicken or fish
