= Mary and Eliza Sumner =

English silversmiths

Mary and Eliza Sumner were a pair of English silversmiths active at the beginning of the 19th century. Their surname is sometimes given as Summers; Eliza's first name is sometimes rendered as Elizabeth.

Mary Sumner was the wife of plateworker William Sumner I and registered her first mark on 18 March 1807; after his death, her classification was given as spoonworker at the time. A second mark was registered in partnership with Eliza on 31 August 1809; a third mark, also in partnership with her daughter, followed on 21 August 1810. Eliza's classification, too, was given as spoonworker; her marital status was given as single, while her mother registered as a widow. Their address was listed as 1 Clerkenwell Close.

Three pieces by the Sumners are owned by the National Museum of Women in the Arts. They are a Regency meat skewer of 1811; a Regency marrow scoop of 1812; and a Regency meat fork of 1814.
