= Tinola =

Filipino soup dish

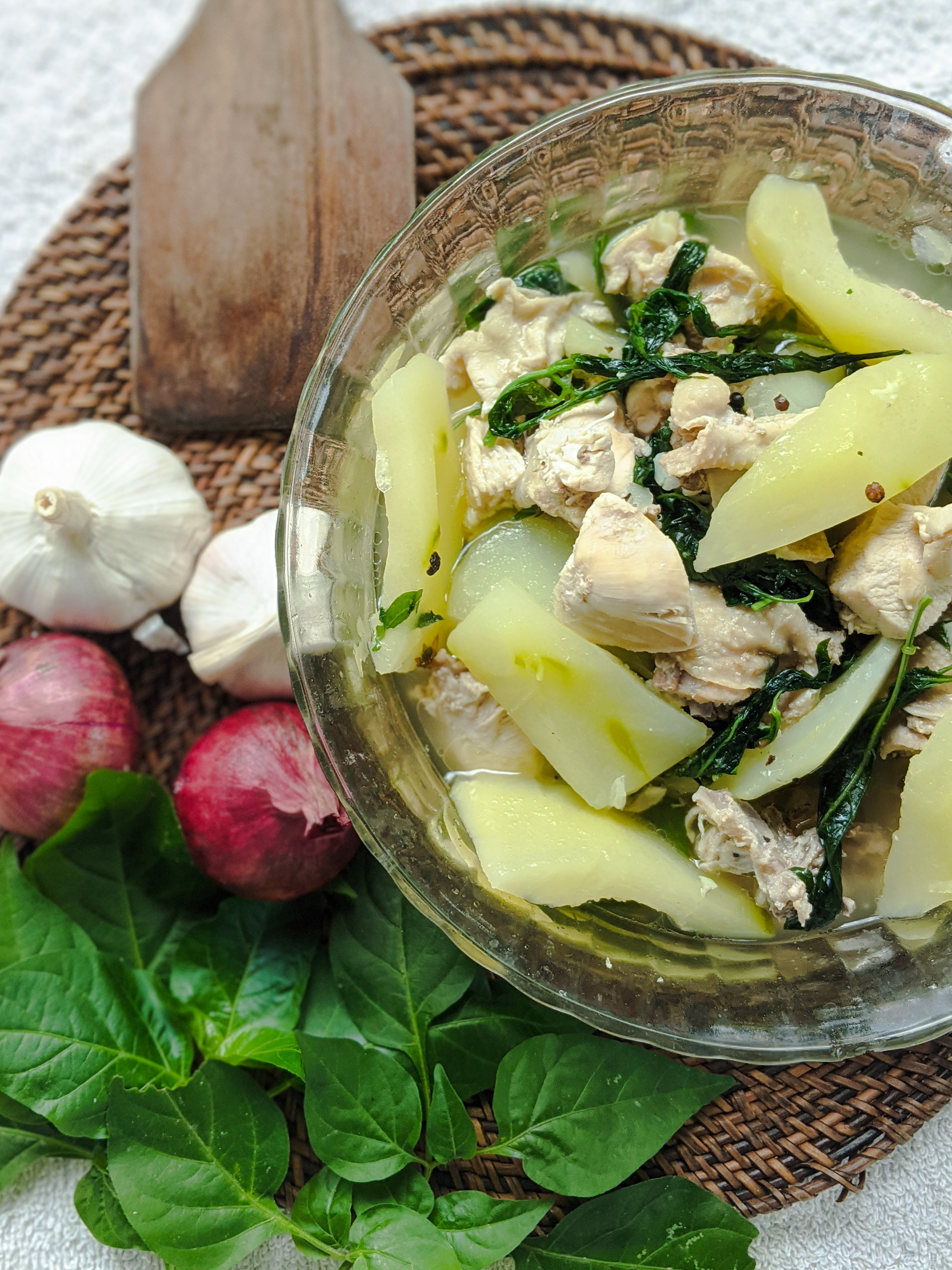
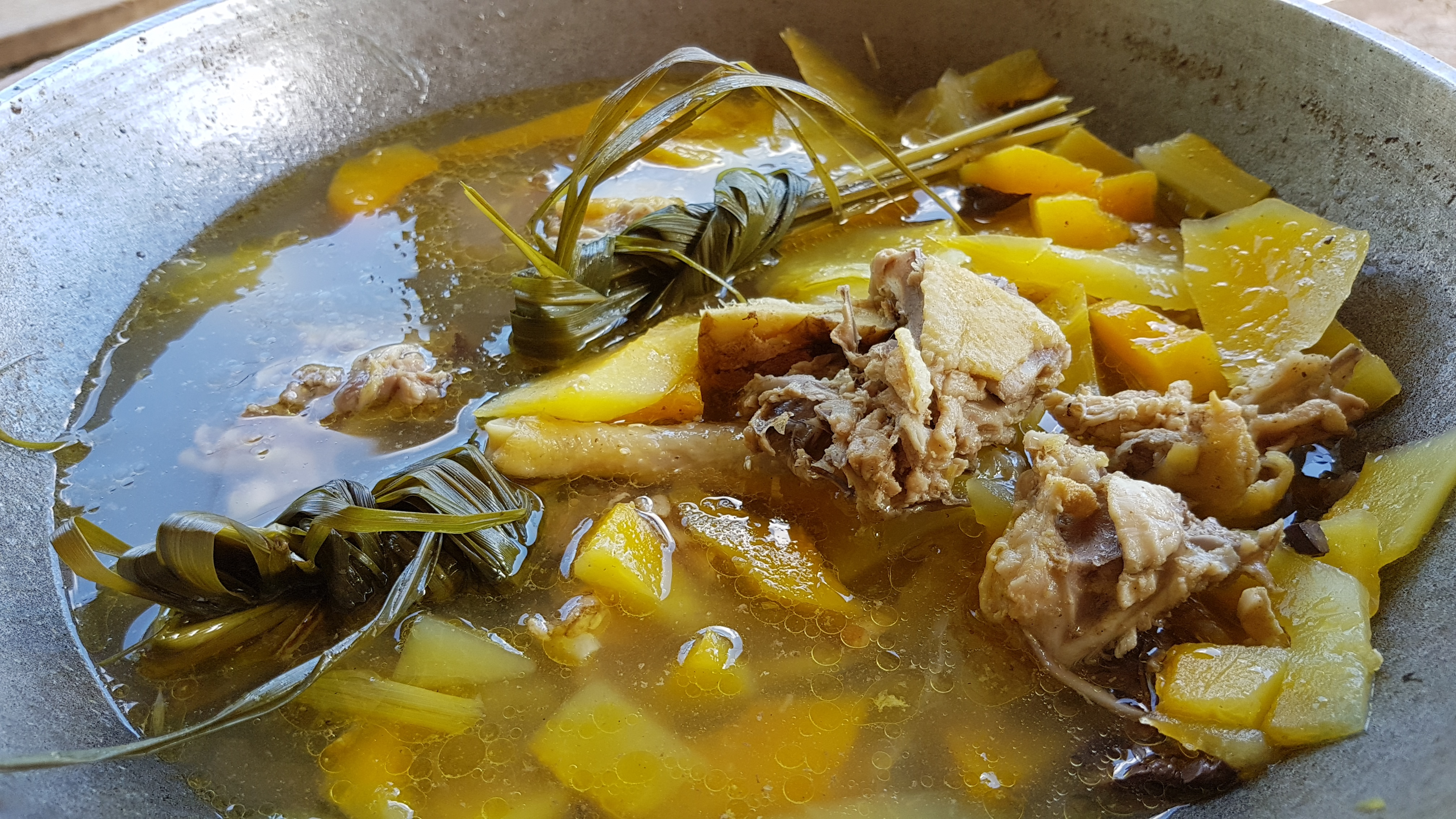
- Top: Chicken tinola with chayote and labuyo pepper leaves; Bottom: Chicken tinola with green papaya and lemongrass
- Course: Main course
- Place of origin: The Philippines
- Serving temperature: Hot
- Main ingredients: Chicken, green papaya or chayote, siling labuyo leaves, ginger, onion, fish sauce
- Variations: Pork with chayote and moringa; Fish with tomatoes; Nilarang/Linarang (Cebuano variant)
- Similar dishes: Tiyula itum, bulalo

Tinola is a Filipino soup usually served as a main course with white rice. Traditionally, the dish is cooked with chicken or fish, wedges of papaya and/or chayote, and leaves of the siling labuyo chili pepper in broth flavored with ginger, onions, and fish sauce.

== Variants ==
Variants of the dish substitute chicken with fish, seafood, or pork. Chayote or calabash (upo) also may be substituted for green papaya. In addition to pepper leaves, other leafy vegetables may be used including pechay, kangkong, spinach, moringa leaves, and mustard greens among others. Additional ingredients like potatoes and tomatoes may be added.

== Cultural significance ==
One of the earliest mentions of the dish is in José Rizal's first novel, Noli Me Tangere, where Kapitan Tiago served it to Crisostomo Ibarra after arriving from Europe. He was given the chicken liver and gizzard meanwhile, to the dismay of the corrupt Spanish friar, Padre Damaso, who received chicken neck and wing, considered to be the least favored chicken parts.

== Similar dishes ==
Tinola is very similar to binakol and ginataang manok, but different in that the latter two use coconut water and coconut milk, respectively. A related dish is lauya made by the Ilocano people. However, lauya is partial to using pork or beef knuckles.

A similar soup dish is known as sinabawang gulay (literally "vegetable soup", also utan Bisaya), which is made from moringa leaves and various vegetables.

== See also ==
- Tiyula itum
- Sinampalukan
- Nilaga
- List of soups

== Sources ==
- Fernandez, D. G. (1994). Tikim: Essays on Philippine Food and Culture. Anvil Publishing.
- Sta. Maria, F. P. (2006). The Governor-General's Kitchen: Philippine Culinary Vignettes and Period Recipes, 1521–1935. Anvil Publishing.
- Villanueva, R. (2020). Exploring Filipino Cuisine: A Cultural and Historical Perspective. Philippine Culinary Press.
- Philippine Department of Agriculture. (n.d.). Philippine Native Ingredients and Recipes.
