= Bone marrow as food =

Food

Humans consume the bone marrow of animals as a food source. It is found in the long bones of animals and comes in two types: yellow and red marrow. Red marrow contains more nutrients than yellow marrow. Marrow can be found in bone-in cuts of meat from butchers or supermarkets.

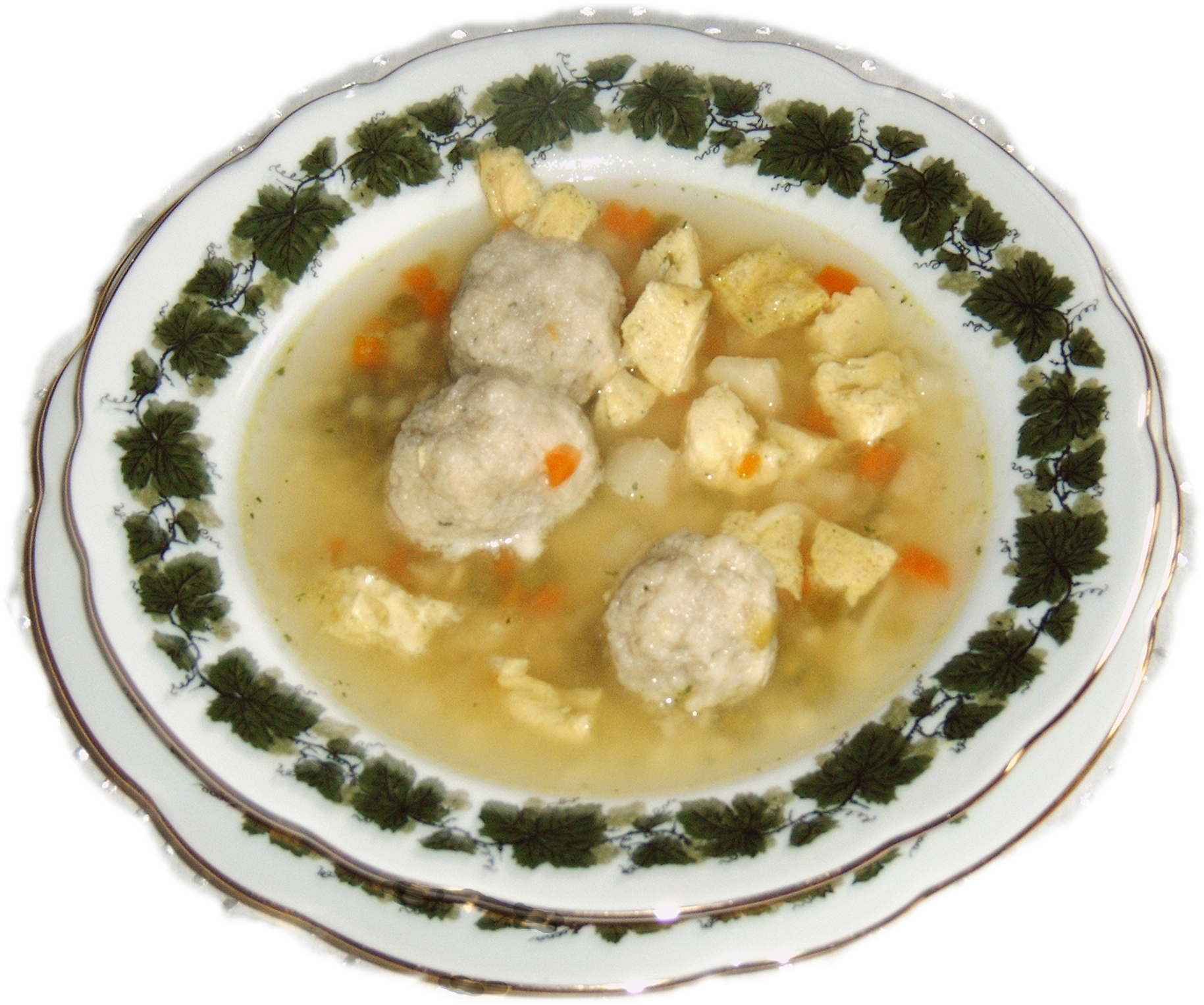
In some parts of Germany, beef soup is served with Markklößchen (bone marrow balls).

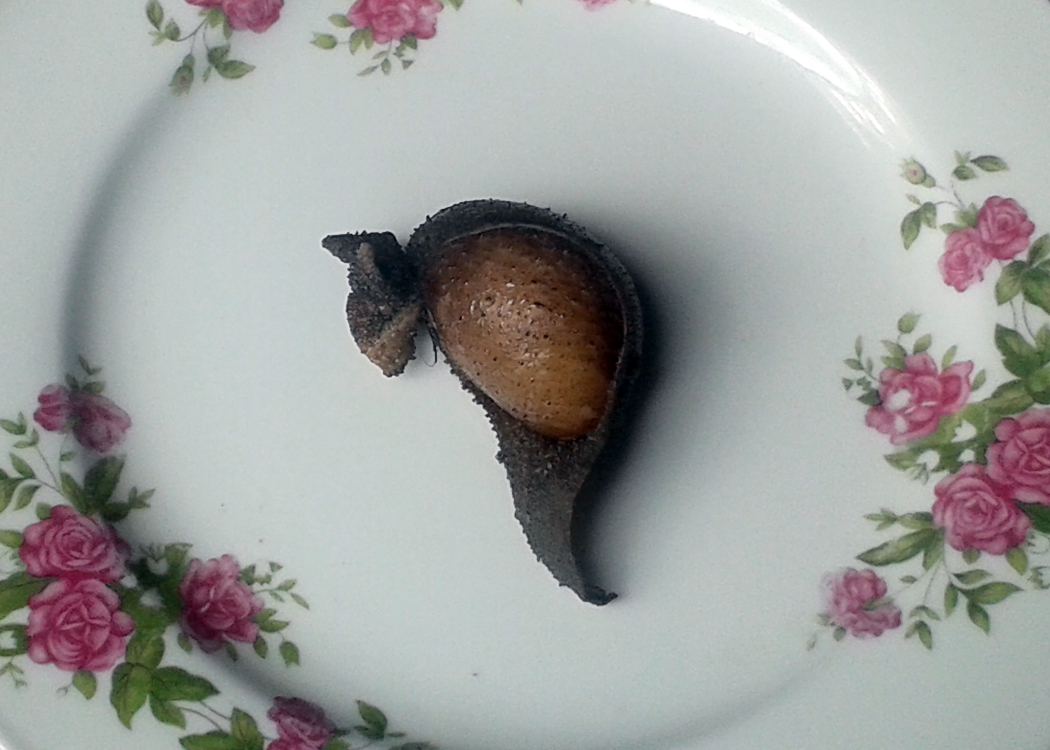
Sapu mhichā, a leaf tripe bag stuffed with bone marrow, is a Newar cuisine delicacy of Kathmandu, Nepal.

== History ==
Many cultures have used bone marrow as food throughout history. Some anthropologists believe that early humans were scavengers rather than hunters in some regions of the world. Marrow would have been a useful food source (largely due to its fat content) for tool-using hominids, who were able to crack open the bones of carcasses left by apex predators such as lions and wolves. Stones shaped like hand-sized balls have been revealed as tools used for cracking open bones to get access to the marrow, and go back almost 2 million years. Evidence for storage of bones containing bone marrow for later consumption has been found in the Qesem cave dating between 420,000 and 200,000 years ago. Archeologists have determined that Neanderthals rendered fat from bone marrow at relatively large volumes as early as 125,000 years ago.

European diners in the 18th century used a marrow scoop (or marrow spoon), often of silver and with a long, thin bowl, as a table implement for removing marrow from a bone. Bone marrow was also used in various preparations, such as pemmican. Bone marrow's popularity as a food is now relatively limited in the western world, but it remains in use in some gourmet restaurants, and is popular among food enthusiasts.

== Around the world ==
In Vietnam, beef bone marrow is used as the soup base for the national staple dish, phở, while in the Philippines, the soup bulalo is made primarily of beef stock and marrow bones, seasoned with vegetables and boiled meat; a similar soup in the Philippines is called kansi.

In Indonesia, bone marrow is called sumsum and can be found especially in Minangkabau cuisine. Sumsum is often cooked as soup or as gulai (a curry-like dish).

In India and Pakistan, slow-cooked marrow is the core ingredient of the dish nalli nihari.

In China, pig tibia is used to make slow-cooked soup, with one or both ends of the tibia chopped off. After the soup is done, the marrow would be scooped out with chopsticks. In some restaurants, cooked pig tibia would be served with a drinking straw specifically for sucking out the semi-liquified marrow.

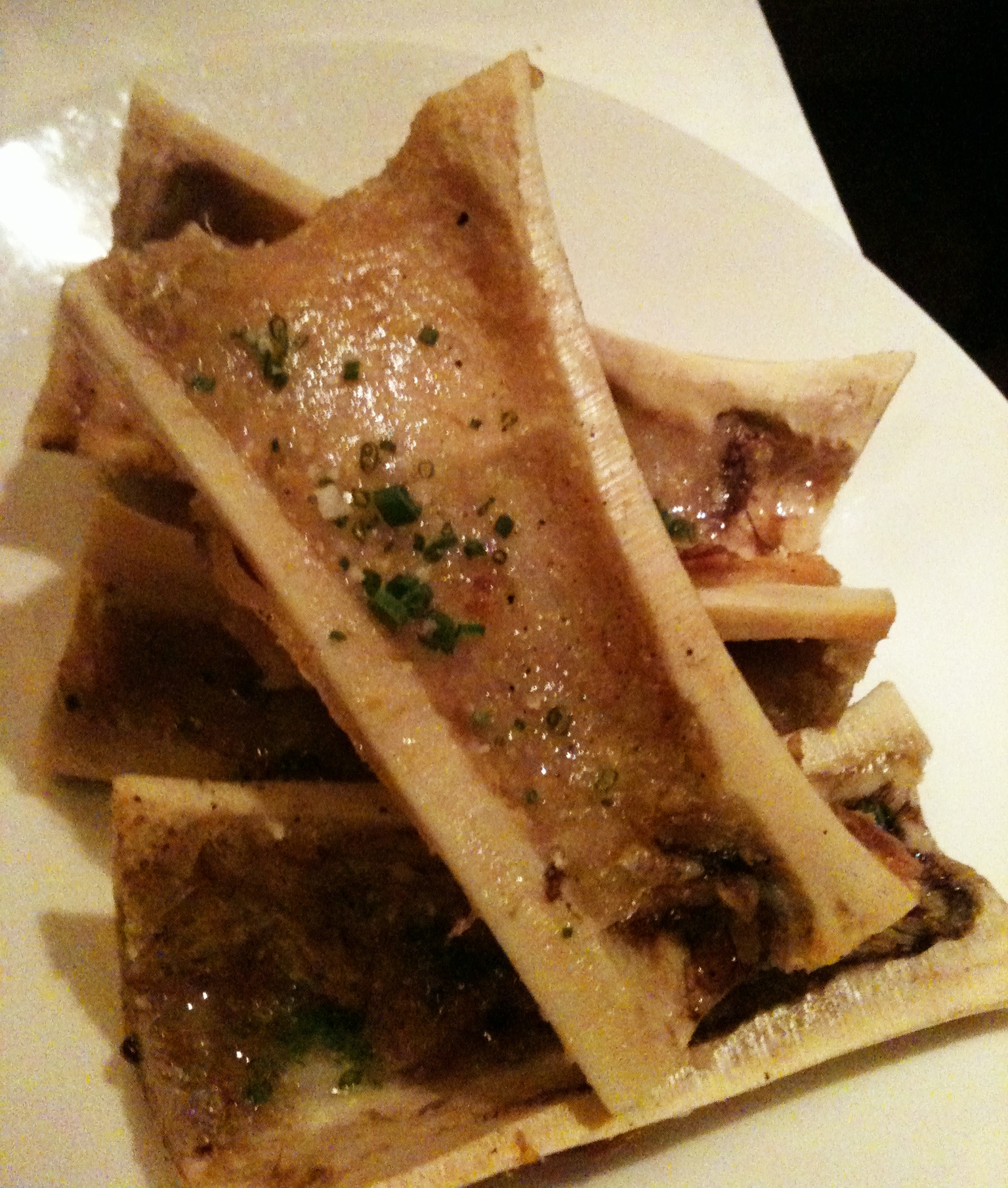
Bone marrow

In Hungary, tibia is a main ingredient of beef soup; the bone is chopped into 10–15 cm pieces, and the ends are covered with salt to prevent the marrow from leaking from the bone while cooking. Upon serving the soup, the marrow is usually spread on toast.

In Germany, thick slices of whole beef shank with bone and marrow are a staple available in most grocery stores, supermarkets and butcher shops, and used in many traditional recipes such as beef soups or beef in horseradish cream sauce. These dishes are cooked for an hour or longer, nowadays commonly using a pressure cooker, so that the marrow dissolves into the soup or sauce.

Beef bone marrow is also a main ingredient in the Italian dish ossobuco (braised veal shanks); the shanks are cross-cut and served bone-in, with the marrow still inside the bone. Beef marrow bones are often included in the French pot-au-feu broth, the cooked marrow being traditionally eaten on toasted bread with sprinkled coarse sea salt.

In Iranian cuisine, lamb shanks are usually broken before cooking to allow diners to suck out and eat the marrow when the dish is served. Similar practices are in South Asian and Middle Eastern cuisine.

Some Native Alaskans eat the bone marrow of caribou and moose.

In Kathmandu, Nepal, Sapu Mhichā, which is a leaf tripe bag stuffed with bone marrow, is a delicacy served during special occasions. The bag is boiled and fried, and is eaten when the marrow is still molten.

Soup tulang is a popular bone soup in Singapore. The dish consists of mutton, beef or water buffalo bones, such as ribs and shanks, slow-cooked in a broth with spices like star anise, cinnamon, cloves and cardamom. It is typically served hot with fried shallots, fresh coriander and sliced spring onions, often accompanied by white rice or crusty bread. A distinct red variant, known as soup tulang merah, was created during the 1950s along Jalan Sultan at Kampong Glam by Abdul Kadir. This style originated within the Indian–Muslim community and features bones stewed in a thick, sweet and spicy tomato-based chilli sauce, with notable contemporary stalls located at Golden Mile Food Centre and Tekka Market.

== Spinal marrow ==
The marrow of the vertebrae (French: amourettes, lit. 'little loves'; homonym for testicles) is a particular delicacy: the texture is more akin to brain and it retains its structure when cooking. It is a dish in the mezze tradition in Lebanon, prepared with olive oil and lemon. Consumption of spinal marrow is banned in some countries like the United Kingdom to protect against mad cow disease exposure.
