= Kadyos, baboy, kag langka =

Filipino pork soup

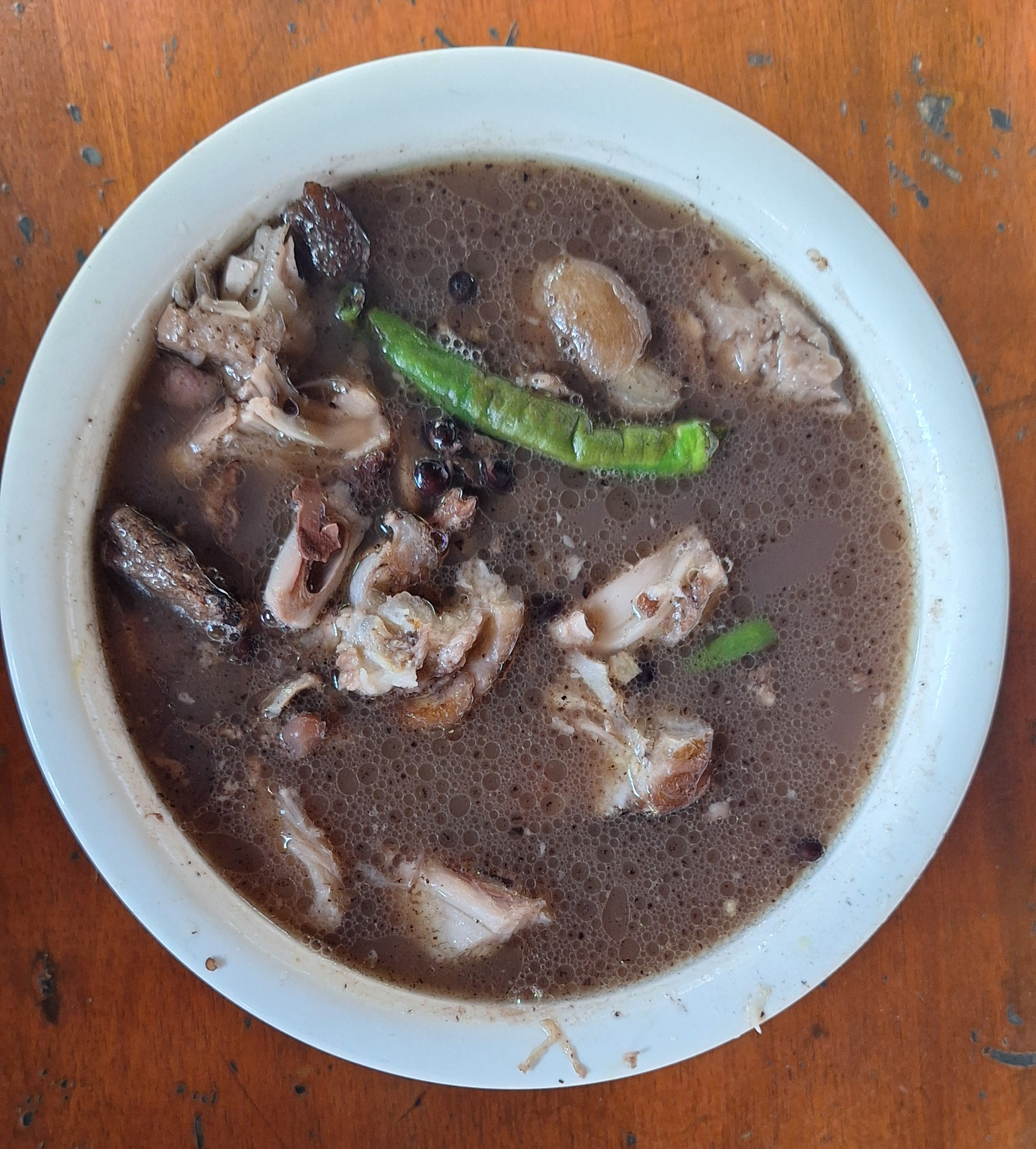
- Alternative names: "Kadyos, baboy, at langka", "Kadyos, baboy, ug langka", KBL
- Type: Soup or stew
- Course: Main course
- Place of origin: Philippines
- Region or state: Western Visayas
- Serving temperature: Hot
- Main ingredients: Pork, pigeon peas, jackfruit, batuan
- Similar dishes: Kadyos, manok, kag ubad, kansi, sinigang, paksiw

Kadyos, baboy, kag langka, commonly shortened to KBL, is a Filipino pork soup or stew originating from the Hiligaynon people of the Western Visayas islands. The name of the dish means "pigeon peas, pork, and jackfruit" which are the three main ingredients of the soup. The soup is also traditionally soured with batuan fruits (Garcinia binucao). Other souring agents like tamarind can also be used. Other ingredients include leafy greens (like young sweet potato leaves, cabbage, or bokchoi), lemongrass, fish sauce, onions, and siling haba peppers. The pork cut used is typically the hock (pata). The dish is characteristically purple in color due to the use of pigeon peas. It is similar to another Hiligaynon dish known as kadyos, manok, kag ubad which uses chicken and banana pith instead.

== See also ==
- Cansi
- Linat-an
- Filipino cuisine
- List of soups
- List of stews
