= Nihari =

Meat stew from South Asia

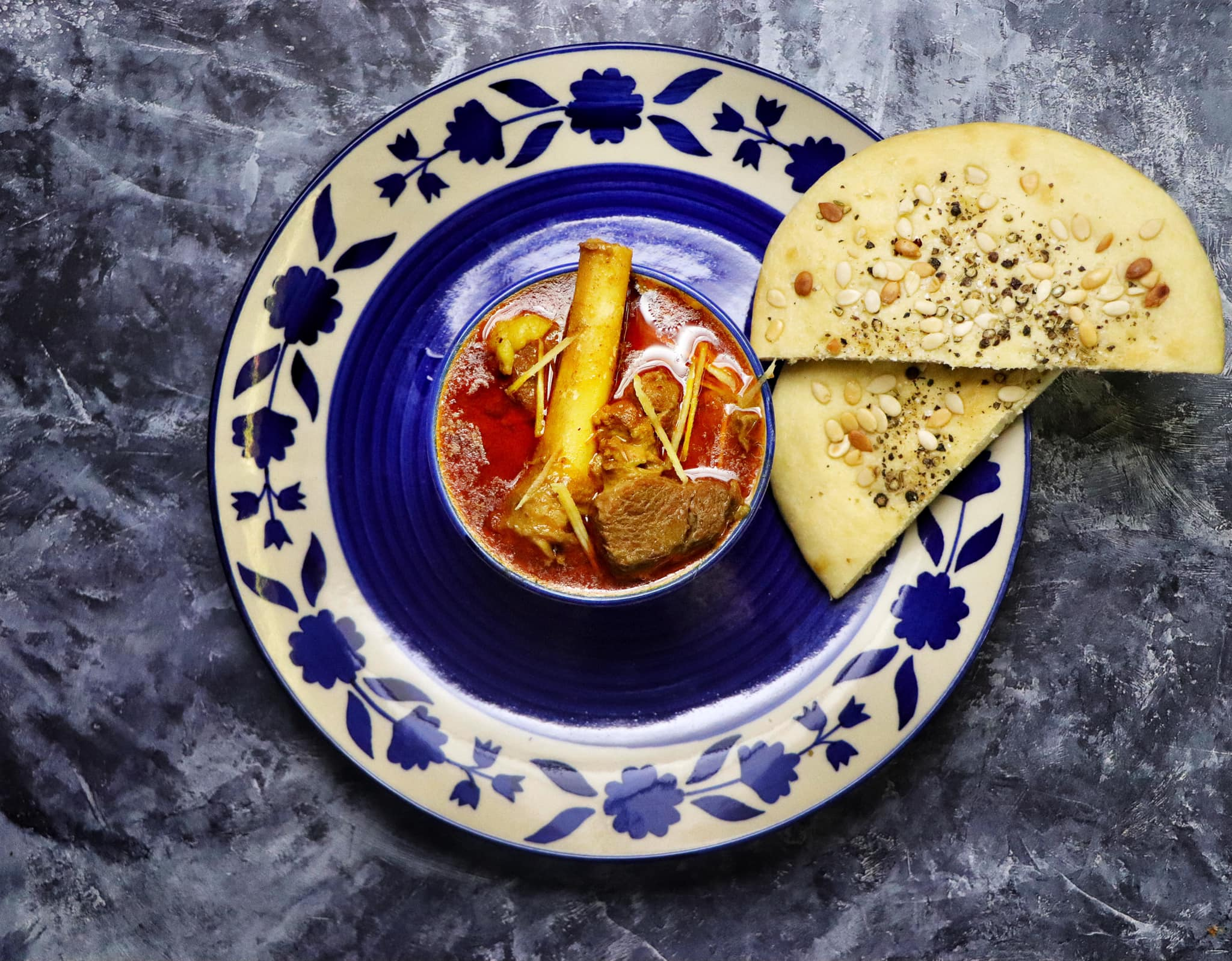
- Nihari with Khamiri Roti served in Delhi
- Course: Main course (breakfast, lunch, dinner)
- Place of origin: Indian subcontinent
- Region or state: Lucknow, Delhi
- Associated cuisine: Indian (Awadhi), Pakistani, Bangladeshi
- Invented: 18th-century
- Serving temperature: Hot
- Main ingredients: Shank cut of beef, lamb and mutton, goat meat, or camel meat, as well as chicken and bone marrow
- Other information: Served with naan or rice or Roti

Nihari (Hindi: निहारी, Urdu: نہاری) is a stew of the Indian subcontinent, which consists of slow-cooked meat, mainly a shank cut of beef, lamb and mutton, or goat meat, as well as chicken and bone marrow. The two most common theories of origin postulate that nihari originated in the Indian subcontinent during the era of Mughal Empire either in the cities of Lucknow or Delhi. It is flavoured with long pepper (pippali), a relative of black pepper and is often served with naan, roti or rice.

== Etymology ==
The Hindi-Urdu name nihari originates from Arabic nahâr (نهار), meaning "morning"; it was originally eaten by nawabs in the Mughal Empire as a breakfast course following Fajr prayer. It is served in the morning, though certain eateries, such as Kallu Mian of Delhi, serve it in the afternoon.

== History ==
The exact origins of Nihari are a subject of culinary debate, with The Bloomsbury Handbook of Indian Cuisine asserting the city of origin to be in the Indian cities of Lucknow or Delhi. One largely accepted tradition attributes that nihari may have originated in the royal kitchens of the Indian city of Lucknow, Awadh (modern-day Uttar Pradesh, India), in the late 18th-century, during the last throes of the Mughal Empire. Another theory postulates its origin in Delhi during the medieval period of India. The dish later gained widespread popularity and eventually became a staple of the royal cuisine of Mughal-era nawabs, coming to be eaten throughout the Indian subcontinent.

== Popularity ==
Nihari is a traditional dish of the Indian cities of Lucknow, Delhi, and Bhopal. Following the partition of India in 1947, many Urdu-speaking Muslims from northern India migrated to Karachi in West Pakistan and Dhaka in East Pakistan, and established a number of restaurants serving the dish. In Karachi, nihari became a large-scale success and soon spread in prominence and availability across Pakistan. Nihari is eaten in Bangladesh as well.

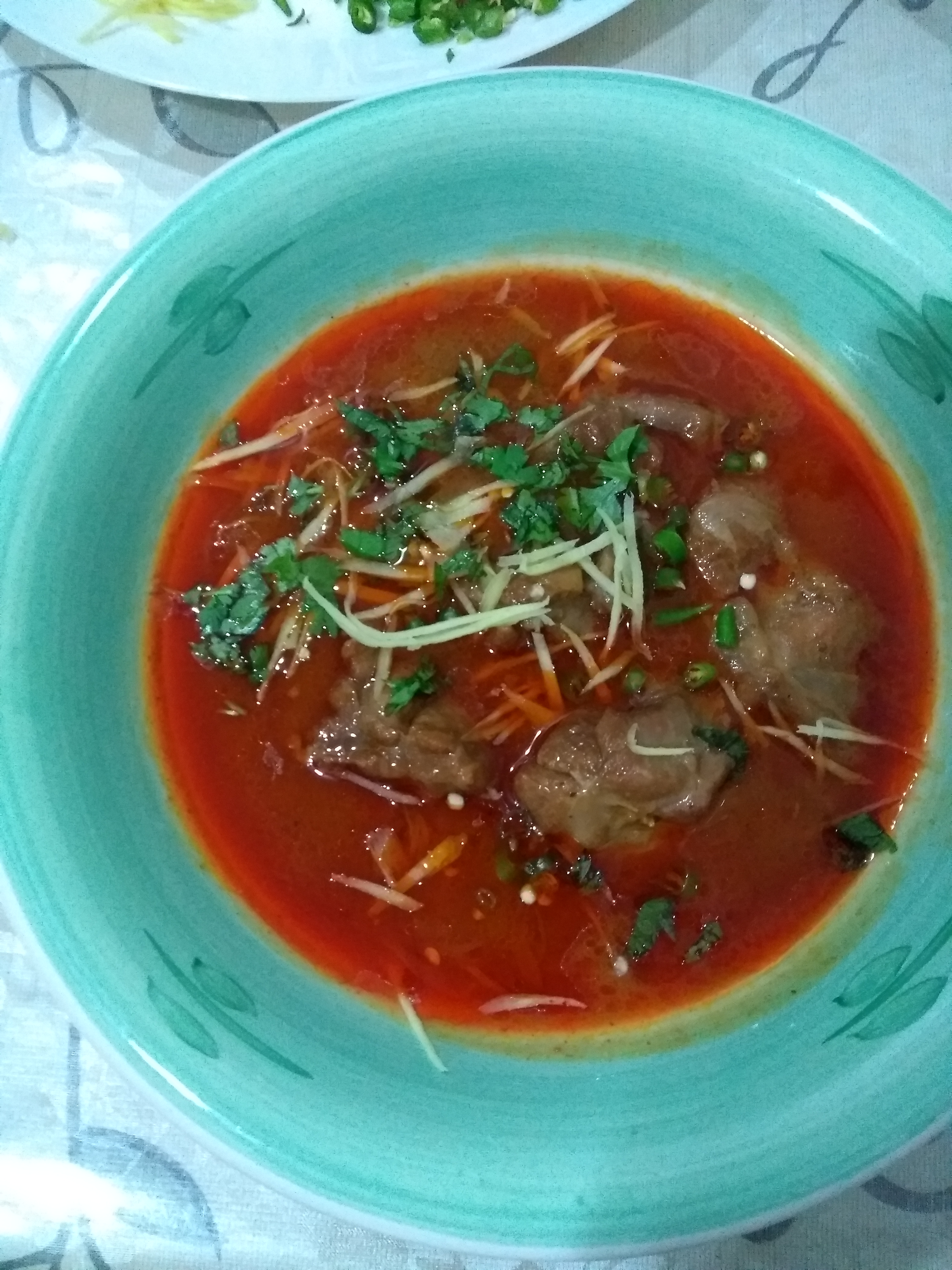
Beef nihari prepared by a Karachiite chef in Ras Tanura, Saudi Arabia – garnished with ginger, coriander leaves, and green chillies.

In some restaurants, a few kilograms from each day's leftover nihari is added to the next day's pot; this reused portion of the dish is known as taar and is believed to provide a unique flavour. Some nihari outlets in Old Delhi claim to have kept an unbroken cycle of taar going for more than a century. Nihari may be consumed with Khamiri Roti.

== Medicinal remedies ==
Nihari is also used as a home remedy for fever, rhinorrhea, and the common cold.

== See also ==
- Awadhi cuisine
- Cuisine of the Indian subcontinent
- List of stews
