= Bulalo =

Beef dish from the Philippines

Bulalô
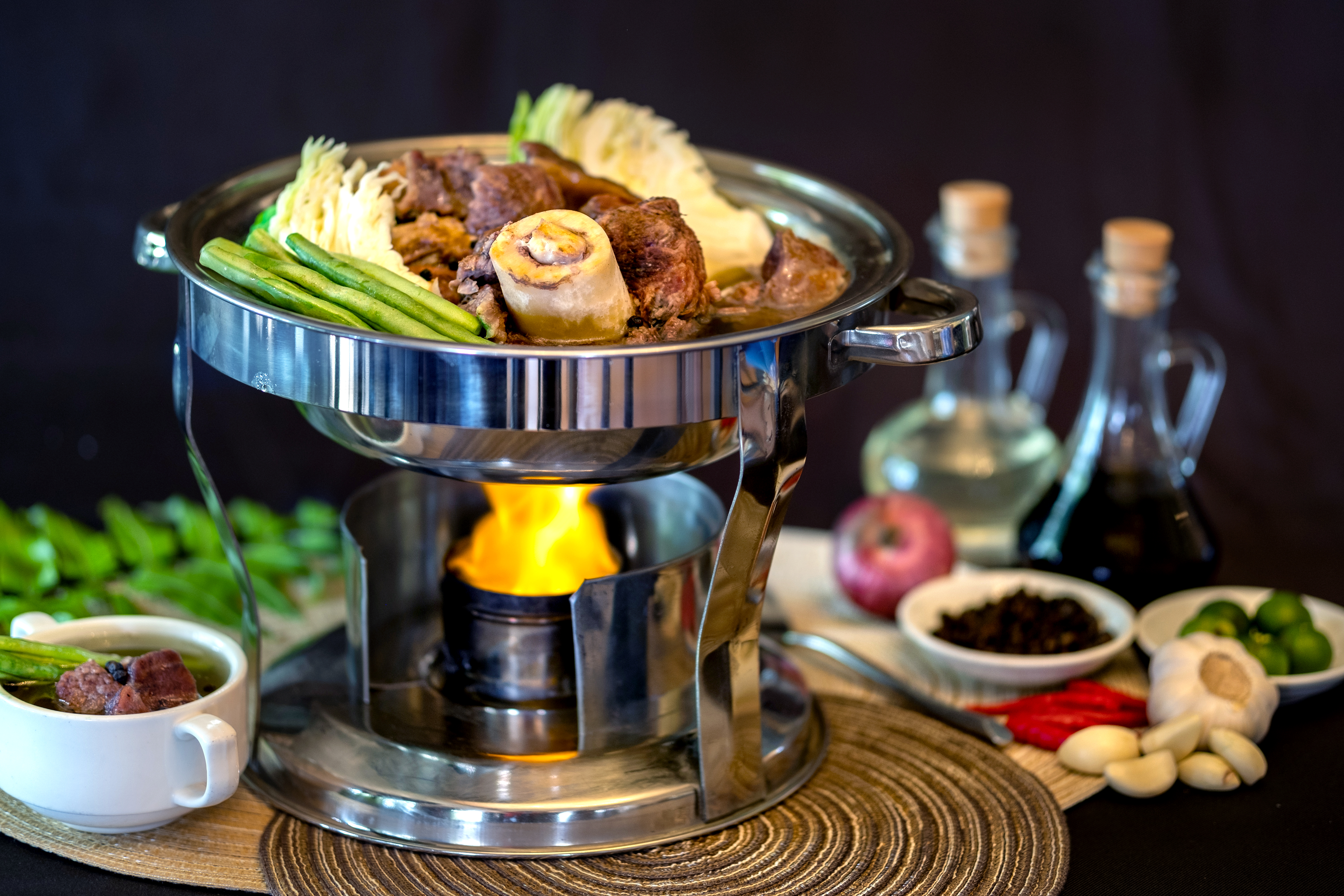
- Bulalô
- Course: Main course
- Place of origin: The Philippines
- Region or state: Batangas
- Serving temperature: Hot
- Main ingredients: Beef shin, cabbage, chinese cabbage, corn, fish sauce, garlic, onion, potato, leeks / spring onion

Bulalô (Tagalog: [bʊ.lɐˈlɔʔ]) is a beef dish from the Philippines. It is made by slow-cooking beef shanks and bone marrow until the collagen and fat has melted into a light-colored broth. It typically includes leafy vegetables (for example pechay or cabbage), corn on the cob, scallions, onions, garlic, ginger, and fish sauce. Potatoes, carrots, or taro may be added. It is commonly eaten with rice, with soy sauce and calamansi on the side. Bulalo is native to the Southern Luzon region of the Philippines, particularly in the provinces of Batangas and Cavite.

Bulalo is a pre-colonial Filipino dish. Its name comes from the word bulalo, which means "bone marrow" in Tagalog (also extending to mean "kneecap"). Bulalo originally does not include vegetables or starchy ingredients (aside from the flavoring ingredients and spices). Though in modern times, vegetables have become more typical in most bulalo recipes. The key distinguishing ingredient of the dish is the bone marrow, which differentiates it from similar beef broth dishes in the Philippines. Bulalo is most commonly confused with nilagang baka, since both can share almost all of the same ingredients. However, nilagang baka only uses meaty and fatty cuts of beef and does not include bone marrow.

Other similar dishes in other parts of the Philippines (which may or may not include bone marrow) include the Western Visayan cansi which is soured with batuan fruit; the Waray dish pakdol; and the Cebuano dish pochero.

== See also ==
- Lauya
- Nilaga
- Cansi
- Philippine cuisine
