= Cansi =

Filipino beef soup originating from the Western Visayas

Cansí
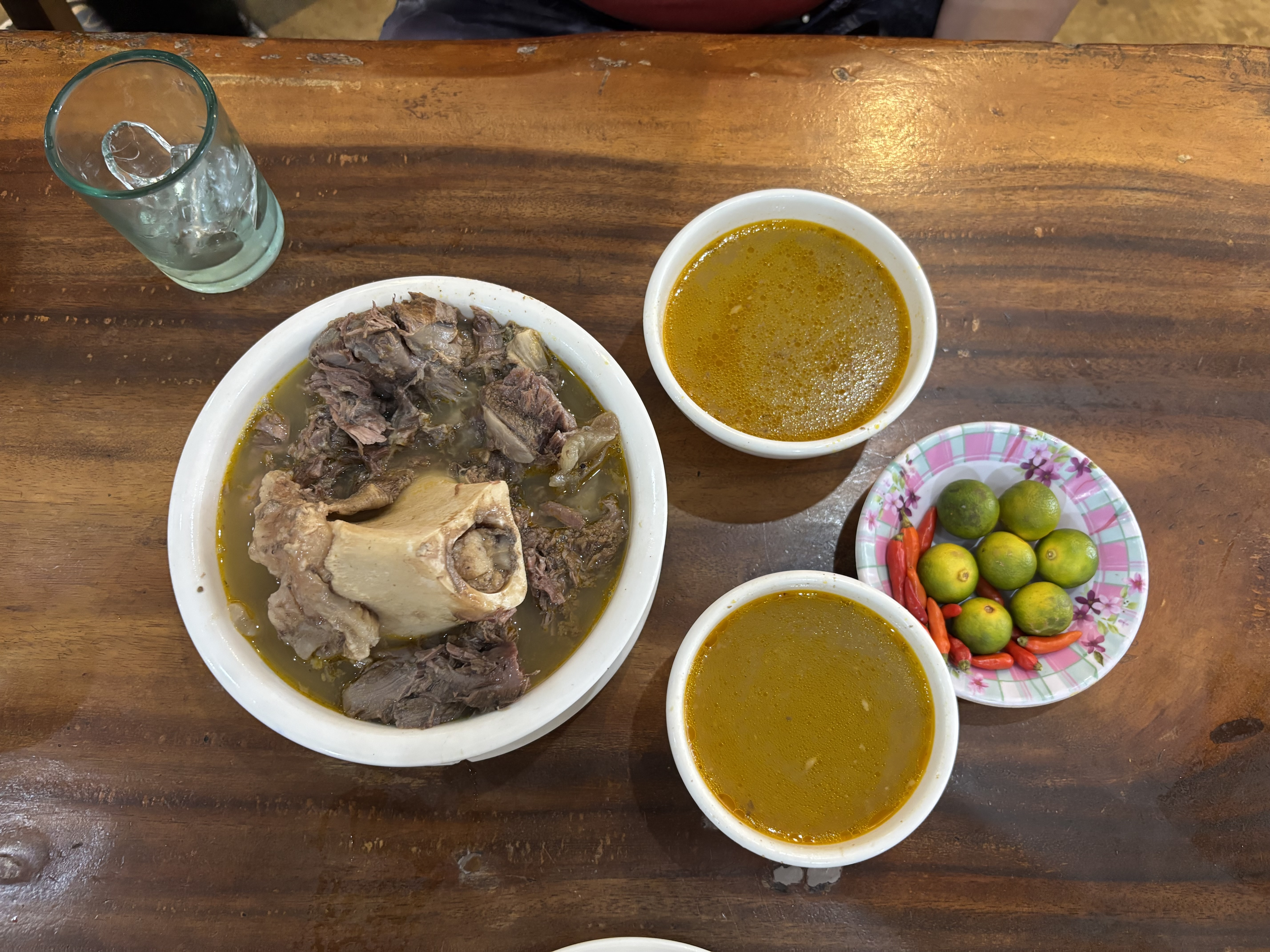
- Cansi in Bacolod, Negros Occidental
- Course: Main course
- Place of origin: Philippines
- Region or state: Western Visayas
- Serving temperature: Hot

Cansí (Hiligaynon: kansi) is a Filipino beef soup. It is made with beef shank and bone marrow boiled until gelatinous. It is uniquely slightly soured with fruits like batuan or bilimbi. Cansi is usually cooked with unripe breadfruit or jackfruit, lemongrass, tomatoes, garlic, onions, fish sauce, and siling haba or labuyo peppers. The soup is usually orange in color due to the use of annatto seeds (atsuete). Cansi originated in Iloilo and then spread across the Western Visayas region. It is also sometimes called "sinigang na bulalo" in Tagalog regions, due to its similarity to sinigang and bulalo.

One of the most popular Kansi/Cansi serving restaurant in the Western Visayas region is the Pat-Pat's Kansi established in 1999 in Jaro, Iloilo City. It has been included as one of the specialty dishes when Iloilo was designated as the "first UNESCO Creative City of Gastronomy in the Philippines".

== See also ==
- Nilaga
- Bulalo
- Philippine cuisine
