= Banana pith =

Starchy inner core of banana pseudostems

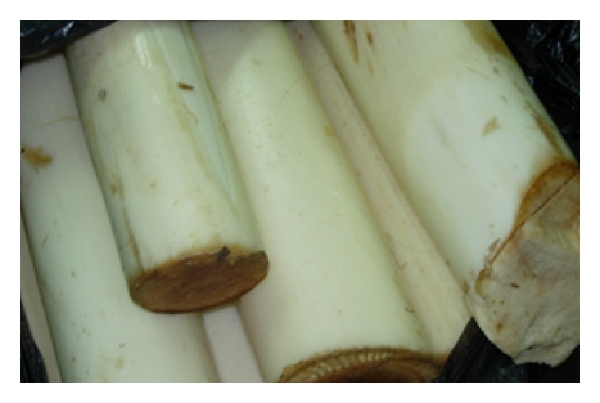
Banana pith

Banana pith or banana stem, is a vegetable harvested from the starchy inner core of banana pseudostems. It is used similarly to heart of palms in the cuisines of the Philippines, Malaysia, Indochina, Sri Lanka, Myanmar and southern India.

== See also ==
- Banana flower
- Banana leaves
- Palmyra sprout
- Deckenia nobilis
- Sago
