= Shank (meat) =

Cut of meat around the tibia of an animal

A meat shank or shin is the portion of meat around the tibia or radioulna of the animal, the leg bones beneath the knee or elbow.

American beef cuts: shank shown in red

Lamb shanks are often braised whole; veal shanks are typically cross-cut.

Some dishes made using shank include:

- Bulalo, a Filipino beef shank stew.
- Ossobuco alla milanese, an Italian veal shank dish.
- Persian biryani, with different shanks.
- Nihari, a spicy national dish of Pakistan and a popular dish in North India and Bangladesh with origin in Delhi, India.
- Cazuela with beef shank meat, popular in 19th-century Chile during the nitrate boom.
- Portuguese Bifana can be several kind of meats in a bun, but "the real thing" is considered to be "febras de porco", pork shanks.

== See also ==
- Beef shank
- Crispy pata
- Pork knuckle
- Pig's trotters
