= Ossobuco =

Italian dish from Lombard region

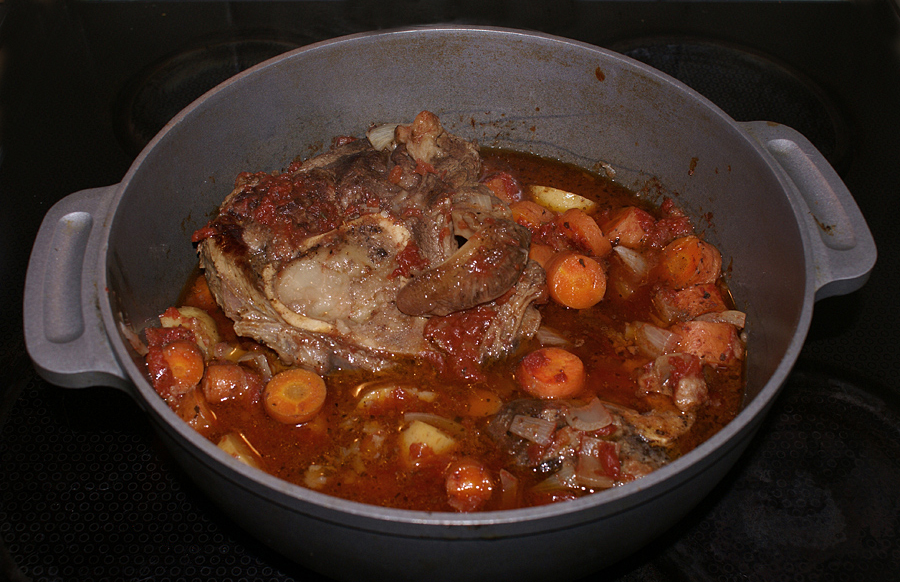
- Alternative names: Osso buco, ossobuco alla milanese
- Type: Casserole
- Course: Secondo (Italian course)
- Place of origin: Italy
- Region or state: Lombardy
- Main ingredients: Cross-cut veal shanks braised with vegetables, white wine, and broth
- Variations: Ossobuco in bianco
- Food energy (per serving): 100 kcal (420 kJ)

Ossobuco or osso buco (Italian: [ˌɔssoˈbuːko]; Milanese: òss bus [ˌɔz ˈbyːs]), also known as ossobuco alla milanese, is a specialty of Lombard cuisine of cross-cut veal shanks braised with vegetables, white wine, and broth. It is often garnished with gremolada and traditionally served with either risotto alla milanese or polenta, depending on the regional variation. The marrow from the hole in the bone (the buco in the osso) is a prized delicacy and the defining feature of the dish.

The two types of ossobuco are a modern version that has tomatoes and the original version which does not. The older version, ossobuco in bianco, is flavored with cinnamon, bay leaf, and gremolada. The modern and more popular recipe includes tomatoes, carrots, celery, and onions; gremolada is optional.

== Etymology ==
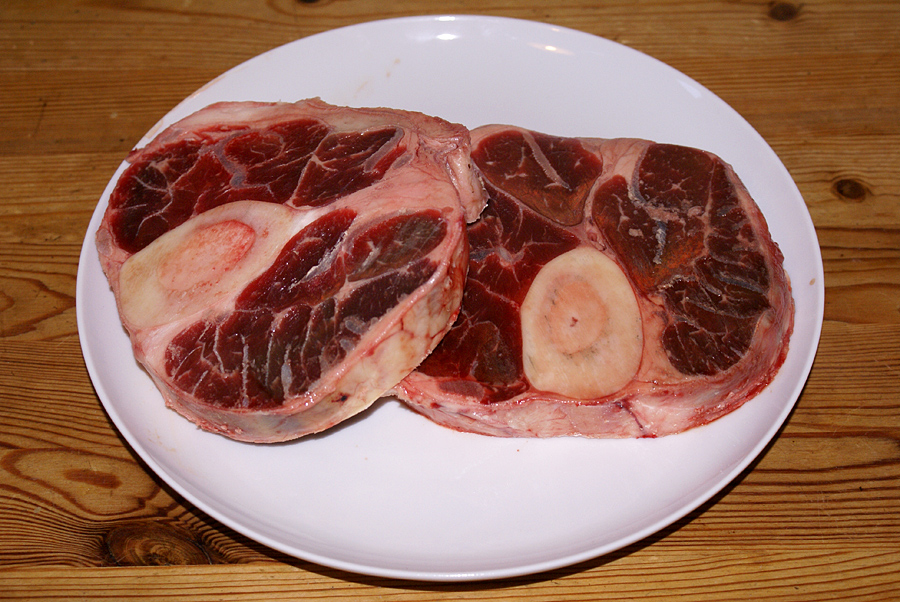
Veal shank

Ossobuco or osso buco is Italian for 'bone with a hole' (osso: 'bone', buco: 'hole'), a reference to the marrow hole at the center of the cross-cut veal shank. In the Milanese variant of the Lombard language, this dish's name is òss bus.

== Preparation ==
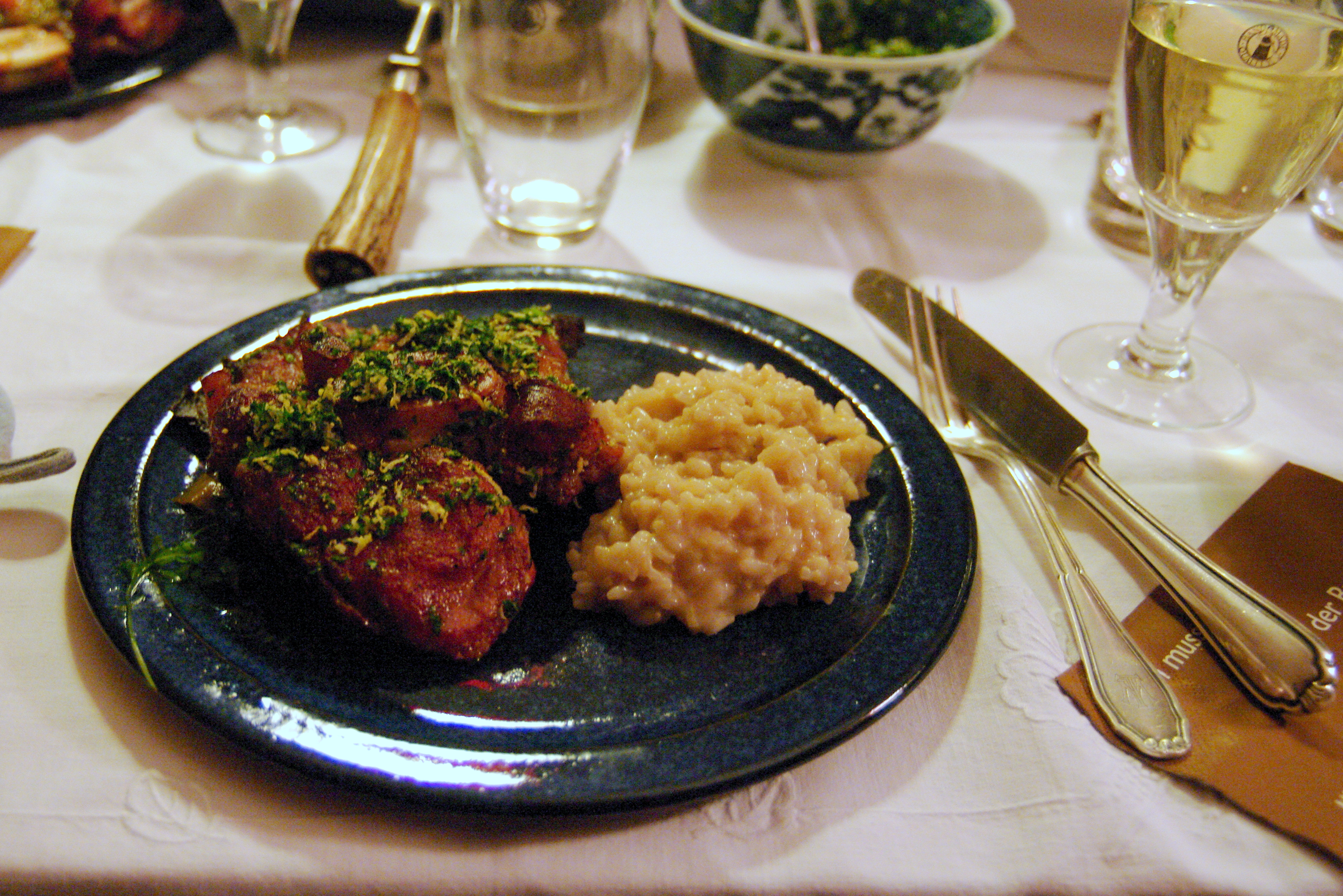
Ossobuco served with risotto

This dish's primary ingredient, veal shank, is common, relatively cheap, and flavorful. Although it is tough, braising makes it tender. The cut traditionally used for this dish comes from the top of the shin which has a higher proportion of bone to meat than other meaty cuts of veal. The shank is then cross-cut into sections about 3 cm (1.2 in) thick.

Although recipes vary, most start by browning the veal shanks in butter after dredging them in flour, while others recommend vegetable oil or lard. The braising liquid is usually a combination of white wine and meat broth flavored with vegetables.

== Accompaniments ==
Risotto alla milanese is the traditional accompaniment to ossobuco in bianco in a one-dish meal. Ossobuco (especially the tomato-based version, prepared south of the River Po) is also eaten with polenta or mashed potatoes. South of the Po, it is sometimes served with pasta.

== See also ==
Media related to Ossobuco at Wikimedia Commons Ossobuco Alla Milanese at the Wikibooks Cookbook subproject
