= Siling labuyo =

Chili pepper cultivar

'Siling Labuyo'
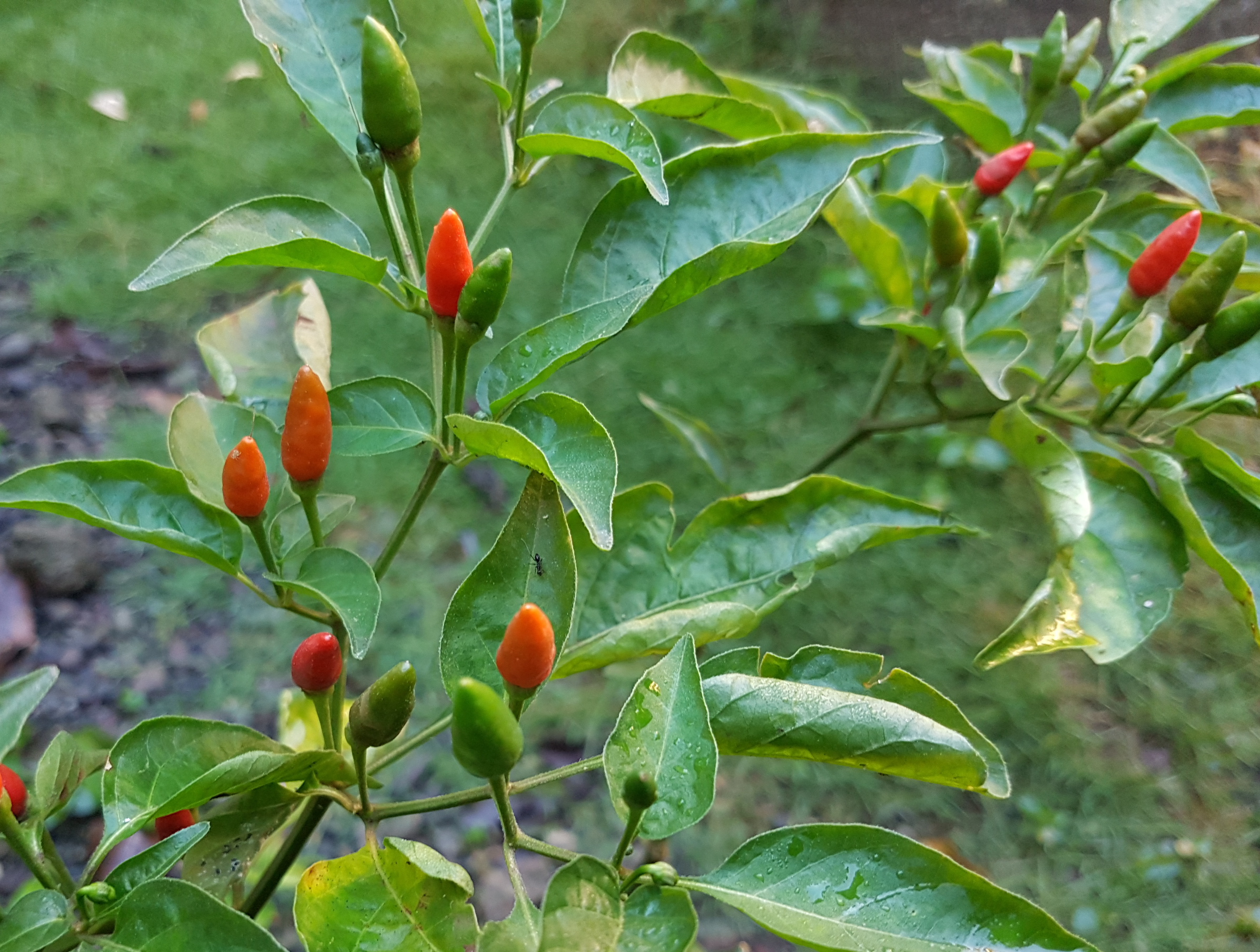
- 'Siling Labuyo' pepper. The small triangular fruits of siling labuyo are distinctively borne pointing upwards, like other Capsicum frutescens cultivars.
- Genus: Capsicum
- Species: Capsicum frutescens
- Cultivar: 'Siling Labuyo'
- Heat: Very hot
- Scoville scale: 80,000–100,000 SHU

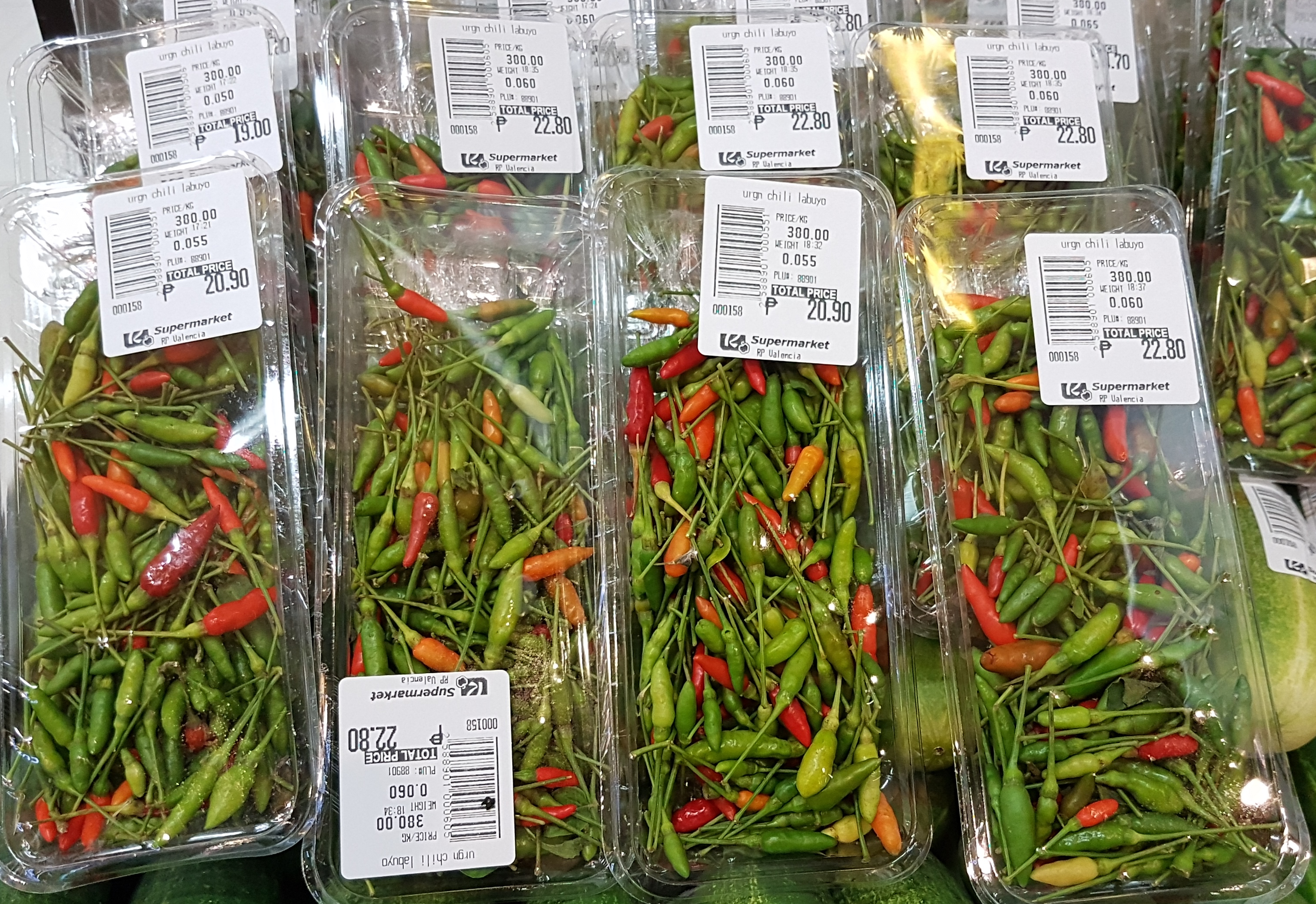
Siling labuyo at a Philippine supermarket

Siling labuyo is a small chili pepper cultivar that developed in the Philippines after the Columbian Exchange, particularly the Manila galleon trade. It belongs to the species Capsicum frutescens and is characterized by triangular fruits that grow pointing upwards. The fruits and leaves are used in traditional Philippine cuisine. The fruit is pungent, ranking at 80,000 to 100,000 heat units in the Scoville scale.

The cultivar name is Tagalog, and literally translates to "wild chili." It is also known simply as labuyo or labuyo chili. Thai bird's eye chili are commonly confused with labuyo in the Philippines, though they are cultivars of two different species, and much larger fruit. Siling labuyo is one of two common kinds of local chili found in the Philippines, the other being siling haba (a Capsicum annuum cultivar).

Siling labuyo is generally accepted as the world's smallest hot pepper, as the fruit often measures a mere 0.20 in (0.51 cm) in length by 0.10 in (0.25 cm) in width.

It is listed in the Ark of Taste international catalog of endangered heritage foods of the Philippines by the Slow Food movement.

== Taxonomy and names ==
Siling labuyo is officially known under the cultivar name Capsicum frutescens 'Siling labuyo'. It belongs to the species Capsicum frutescens. Related cultivars of siling labuyo include tabasco, malagueta, and peri-peri.

The common name "wild chili" is derived from the Tagalog words sili ("chili") and the enclitic suffix -ng, as well as the adjective labuyo ("growing wild"), which is also a term for wild chicken or junglefowl). Other local names for it include chileng bundok, siling palay, pasitis, pasite (Tagalog); katumbal, kutitot, siling kolikot (Bisaya); katumba or lara jangay (Tausug); sili ti diablo/sairo (Ilocano); lada, sambalas, rimorimo, sanggariya (Bikol); paktin (Ifugao); and luya tiduk (Maranao).

== Description ==
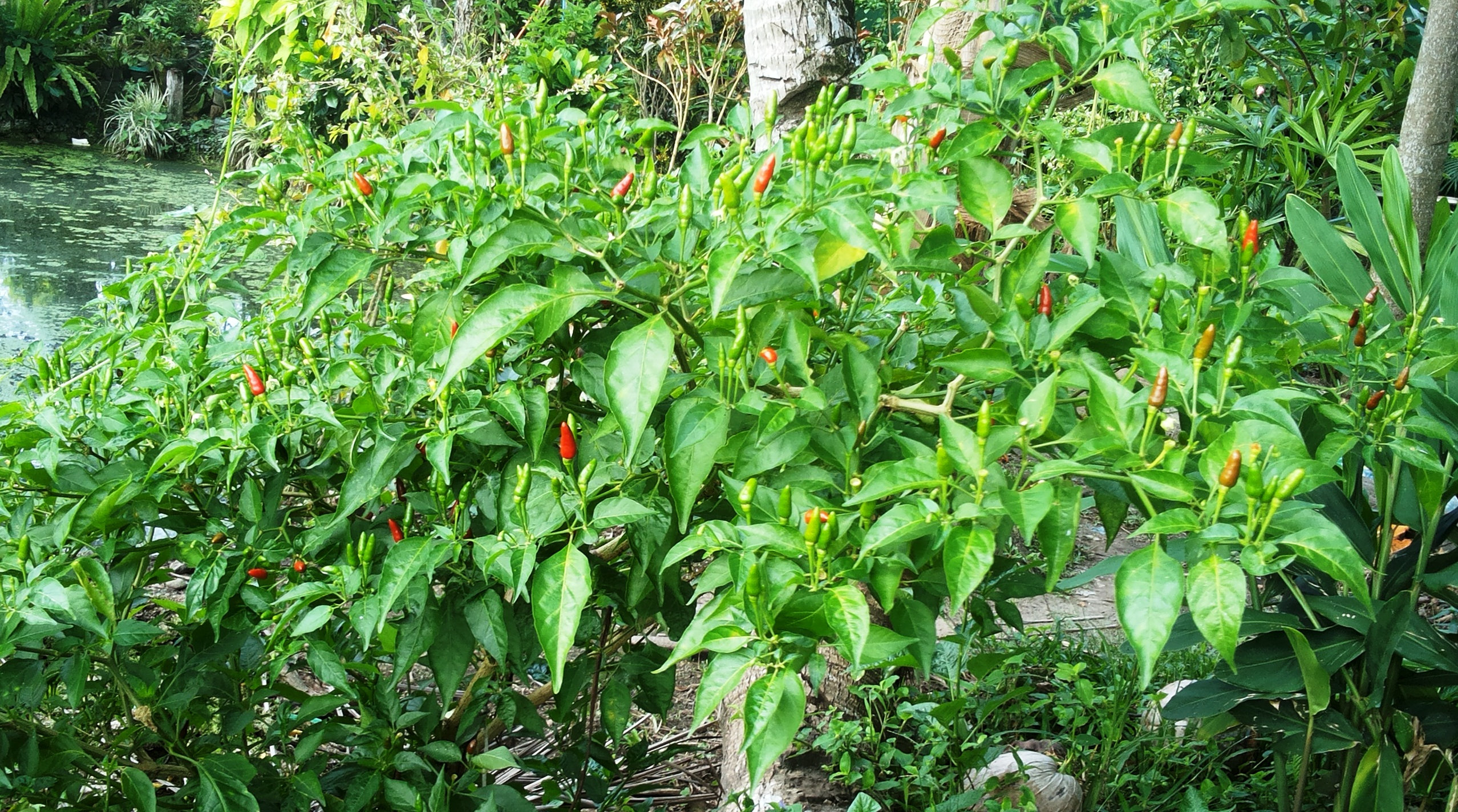
A mature siling labuyo bush

Like other Capsicum frutescens cultivars, siling labuyo has a compact habit, growing between 0.8 and 1.5 m (2 ft 7 in and 4 ft 11 in) high. They have smooth ovate to lanceolate leaves that are around 64 mm (2.5 in) in length with pointed tips. They produce small greenish-white flowers with purple stamens. These develop into a large number of small, tapering fruits that are around 25 mm (1 in) in length. The fruits are very pungent and are characteristically borne erect (pointing upwards). Immature fruits are deep green in color and usually ripen to a vivid red. Depending on maturity and the variety, they can display a range of other colors, including yellow, orange, white, or a vivid purple. Flowers and fruits are often clustered in groups of 2 to 3 at a node.

Siling labuyo fruits are small but are very hot. They measures around 80,000–100,000 Scoville units, similar to the lower end of the range for the hotter habanero chili.

== Ingredient in cooking ==
Although not as central in Filipino cuisine as bird's eye chilies are in other cuisines of Southeast Asia, it is still an often-used ingredient. Its leaves are usually consumed as a vegetable, such as in dishes like tinola.

The most common use of siling labuyo, however, is in dipping sauces (sawsawan), which almost universally accompany fried or grilled Filipino dishes. Unlike in Western cuisines, these dipping sauces are created by the diner according to their preferences and are not made beforehand. Siling labuyo is almost always offered as an optional spicy element, alongside calamansi, soy sauce, vinegar, and patis (Filipino fish sauce).

Siling labuyo is also an essential ingredient in palapa, a sweet and spicy condiment made with scallions, coconut, ginger, and turmeric that is central to the cuisine of the Maranao people.

Siling labuyo can be used to make Filipino-style spiced vinegar (like sinamak and sukang pinakurat) which is also used as a dipping sauce. Instead of mixing fresh chilis on the table, the vinegar itself is infused with a large amount of siling labuyo and other spices and stored in bottles or mason jars. They can be kept for long periods in the refrigerator and their taste develops with time.

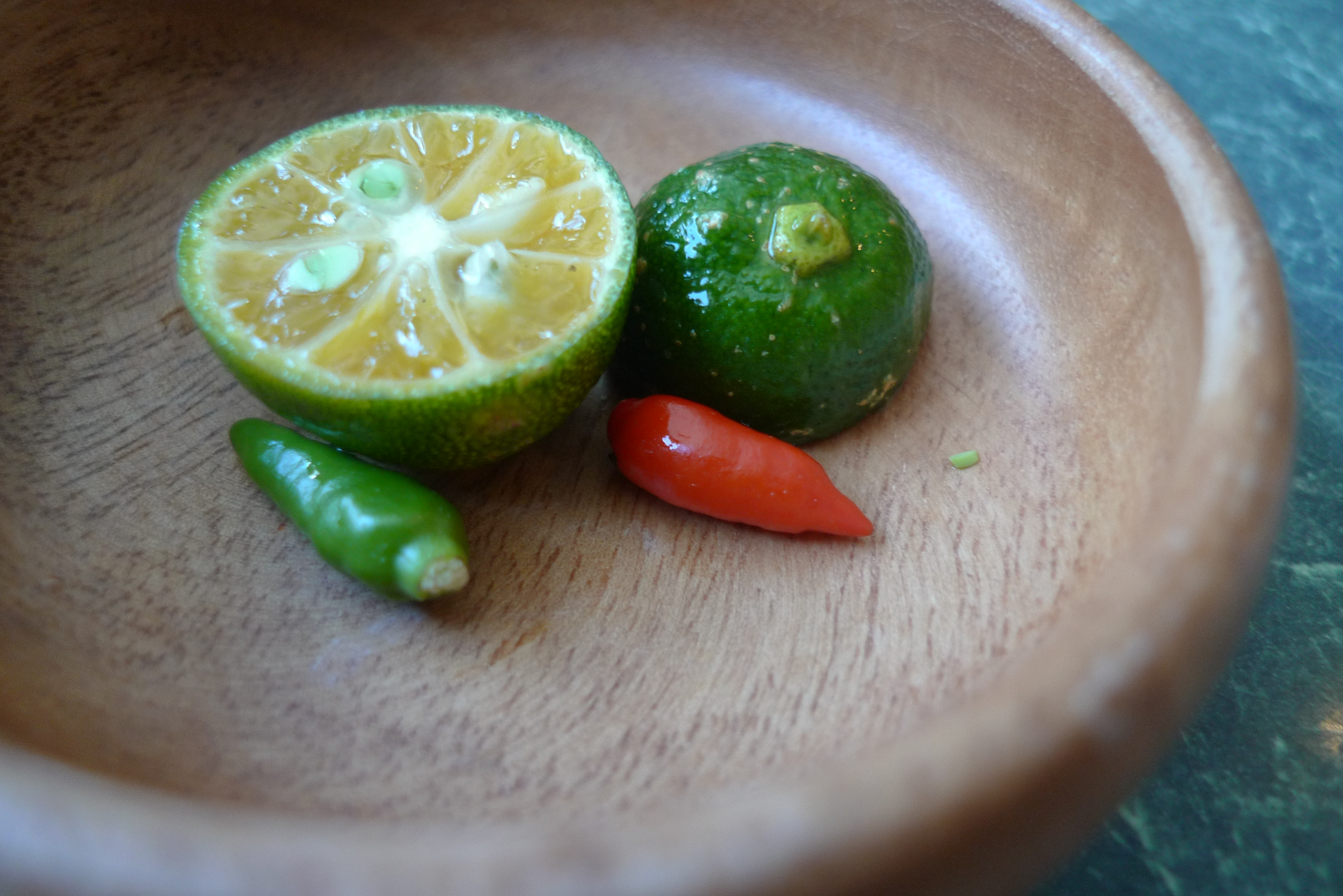
Labuyo chilis and calamansi, ingredients for (sawsawan)

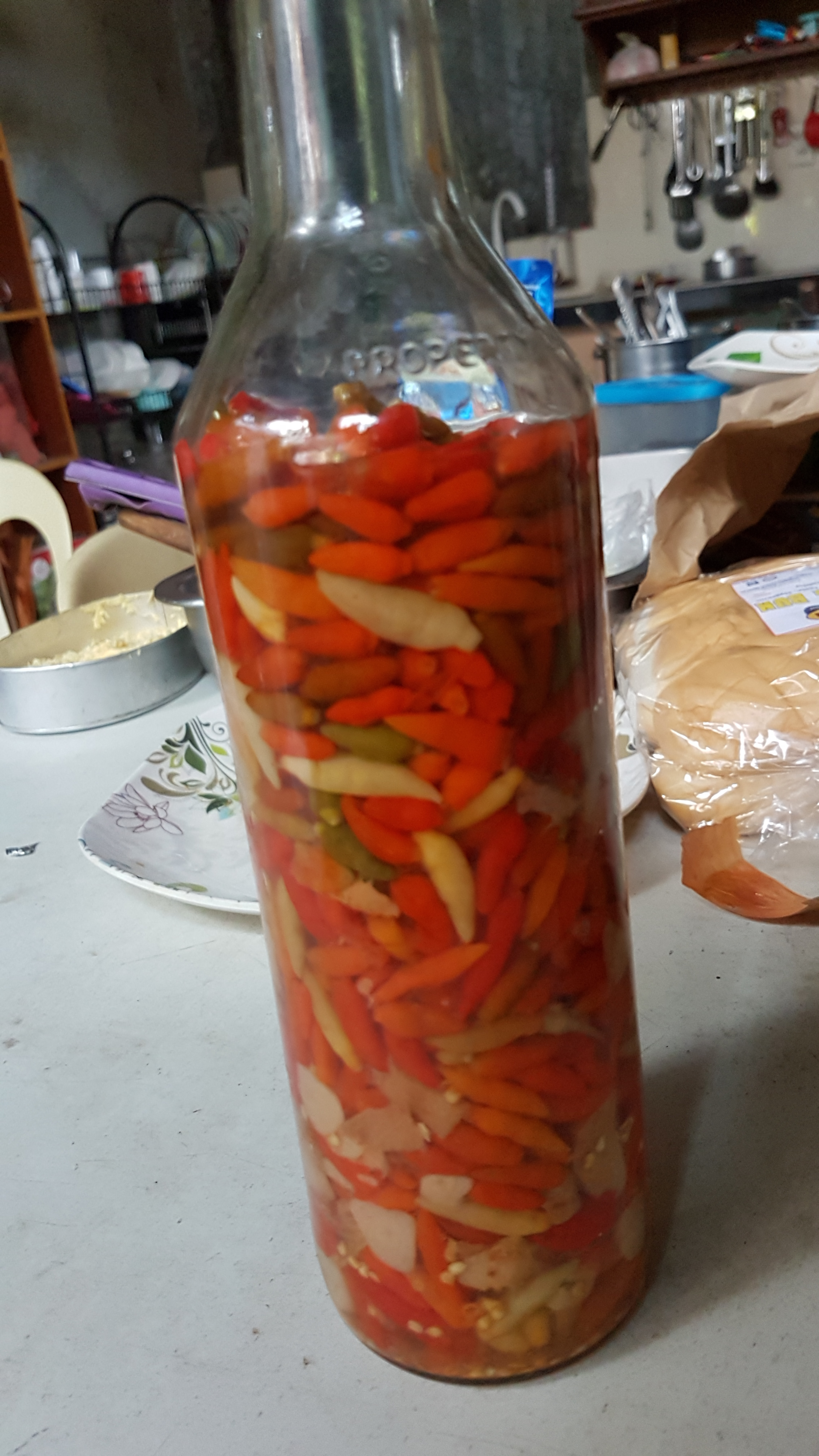
Sinamak, a Filipino spiced vinegar, is made by preserving siling labuyo and other spices in sugarcane or palm vinegar

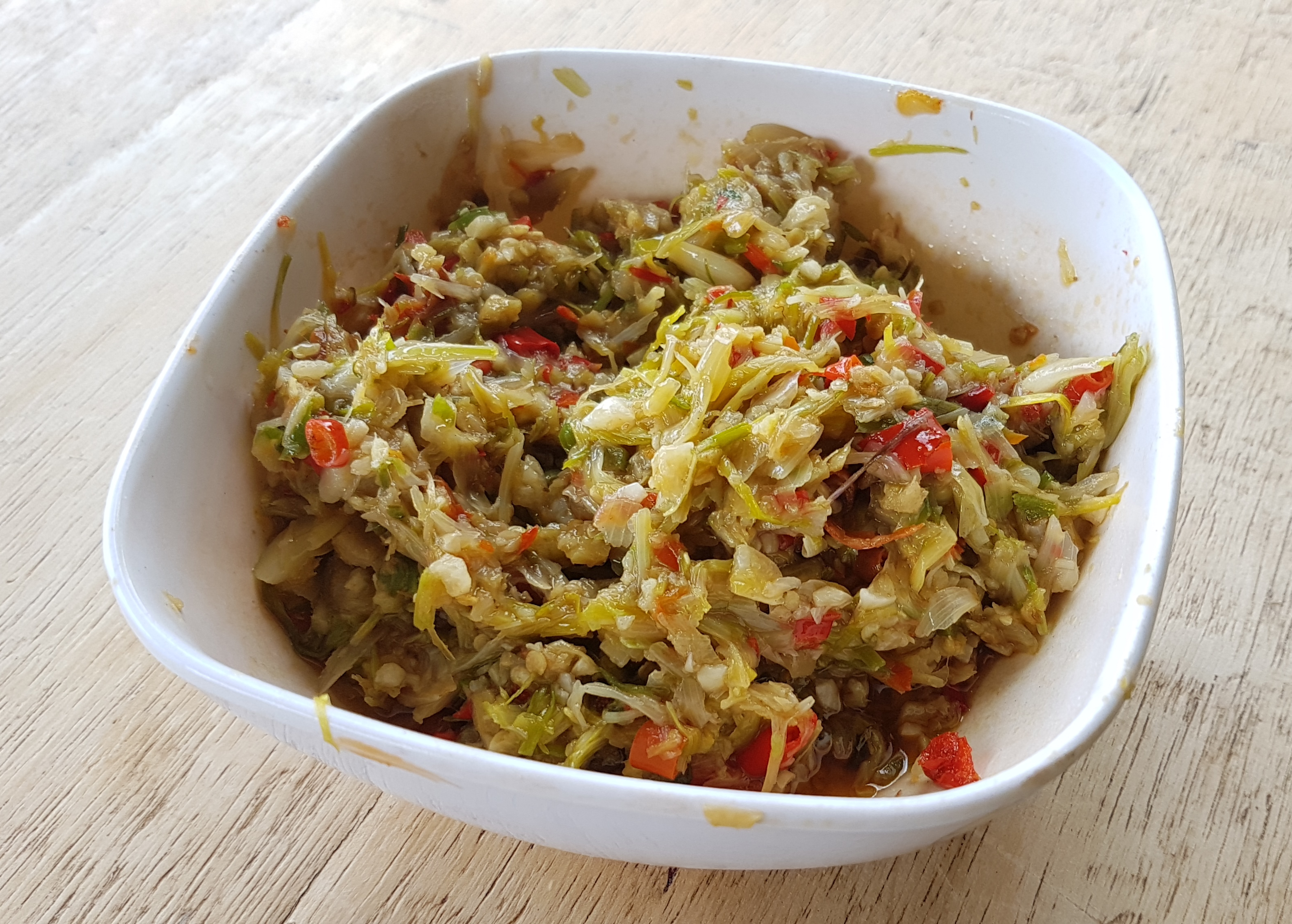
Palapa, a sweet and spicy condiment

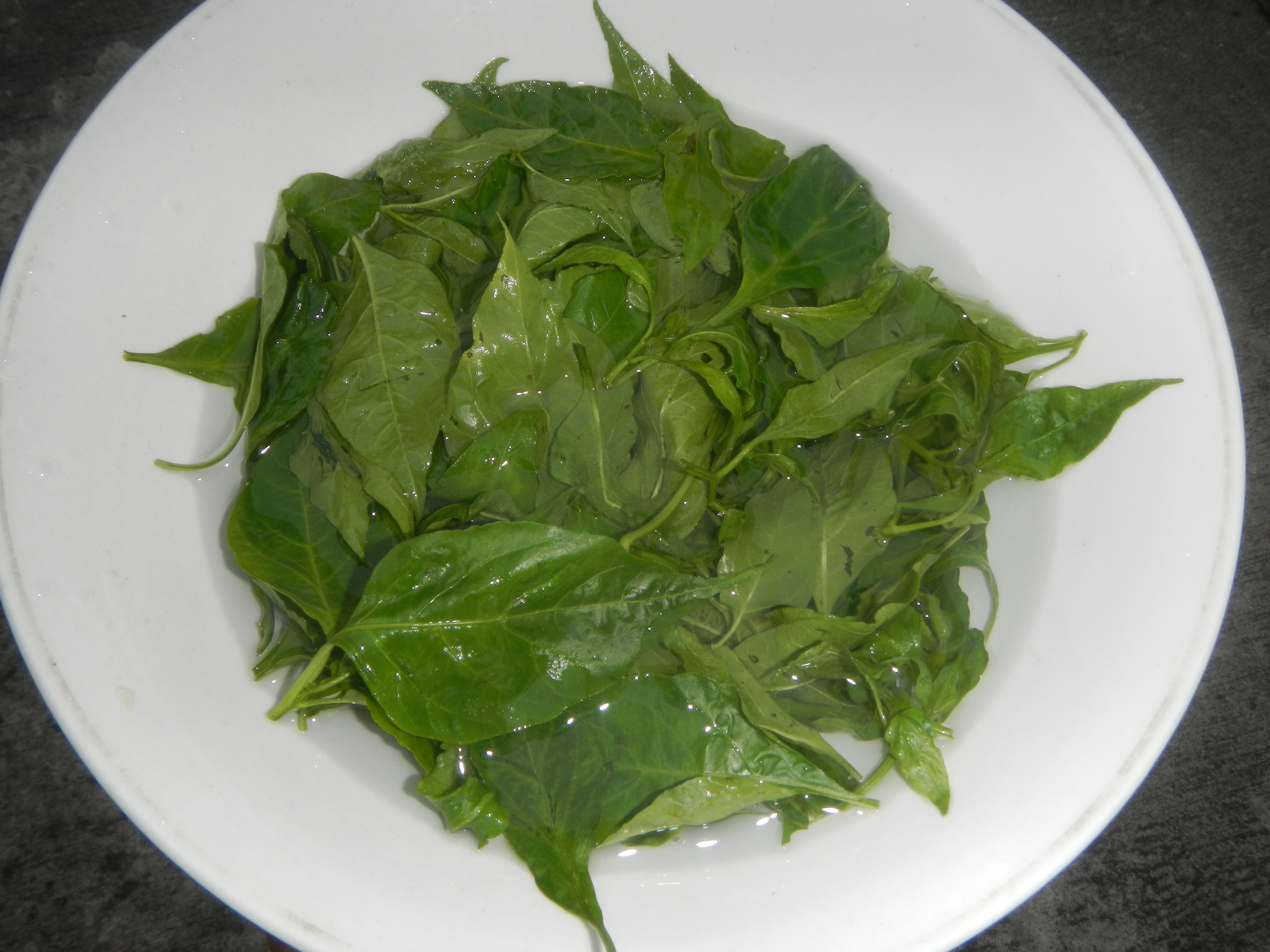
Edible leaves of siling labuyo

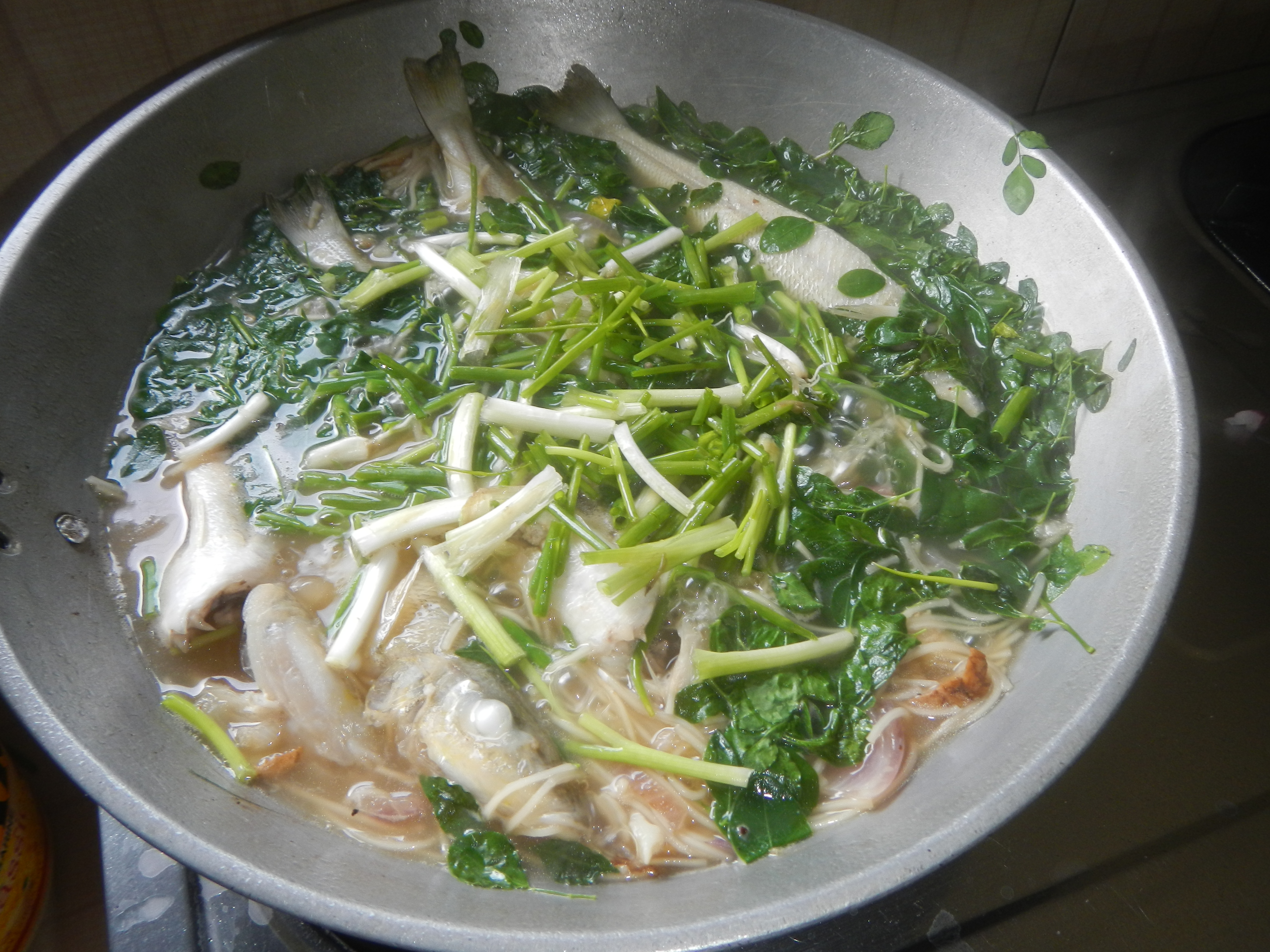
Suam na asuhos (whiting soup) with siling labuyo and malunggay leaves and misua noodles

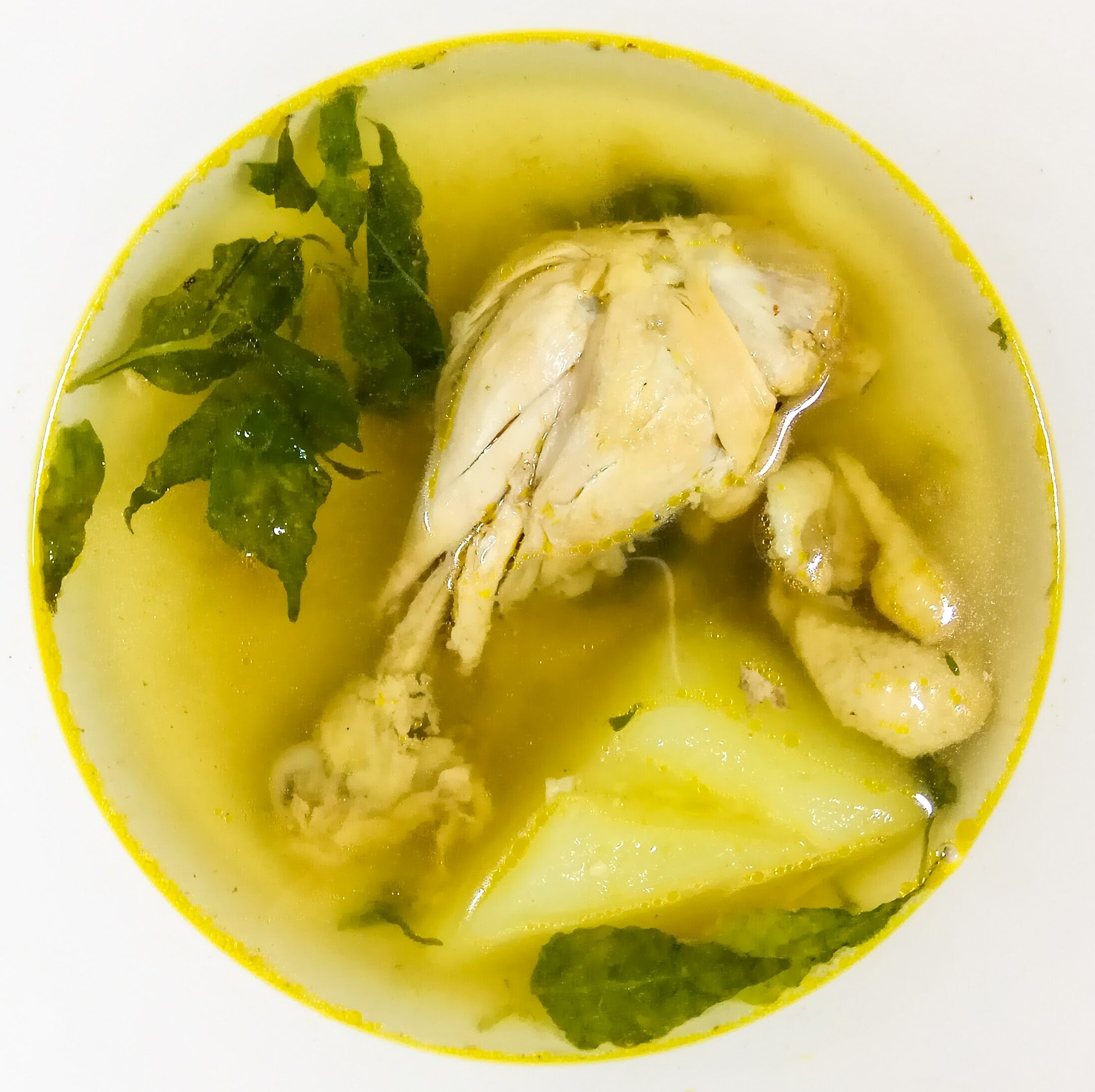
Chicken tinola with siling labuyo leaves

== Natural pesticide use ==
Siling labuyo can be used as a natural pesticide on crops in the Philippines. The fruit, skin and seeds of siling labuyo are all effective for ants, aphids, caterpillars, Colorado beetle, cabbage worms, warehouse and storage pests.

== Commonly confused cultivars ==
Several introduced chili cultivars are increasingly being mislabeled as "siling labuyo" in Philippine markets (especially in Luzon), because these cultivars are generally easier to grow and harvest than siling labuyo. Their color and shape are also more consistent and they have a longer shelf life, but they are regarded as less spicy than siling labuyo.

These mislabeled cultivars include the red bird's eye chili ("Thai chili"), which is actually a chili pepper cultivar from a different species (Capsicum annuum) that came by way of Thailand. Their fruits, unlike C. frutescens, are borne on the plant drooping down. In Luzon, siling tingala and siling tari, high-yield F1 hybrids of C. frutescens and C. annuum from Taiwan are also commonly sold as siling labuyo. While they have C. frutescens ancestry (the fruits are also borne somewhat erect), they are much longer and uniformly red, similar to Thai bird's eye chilis.

Chili cultivars commonly mislabeled as labuyo chili
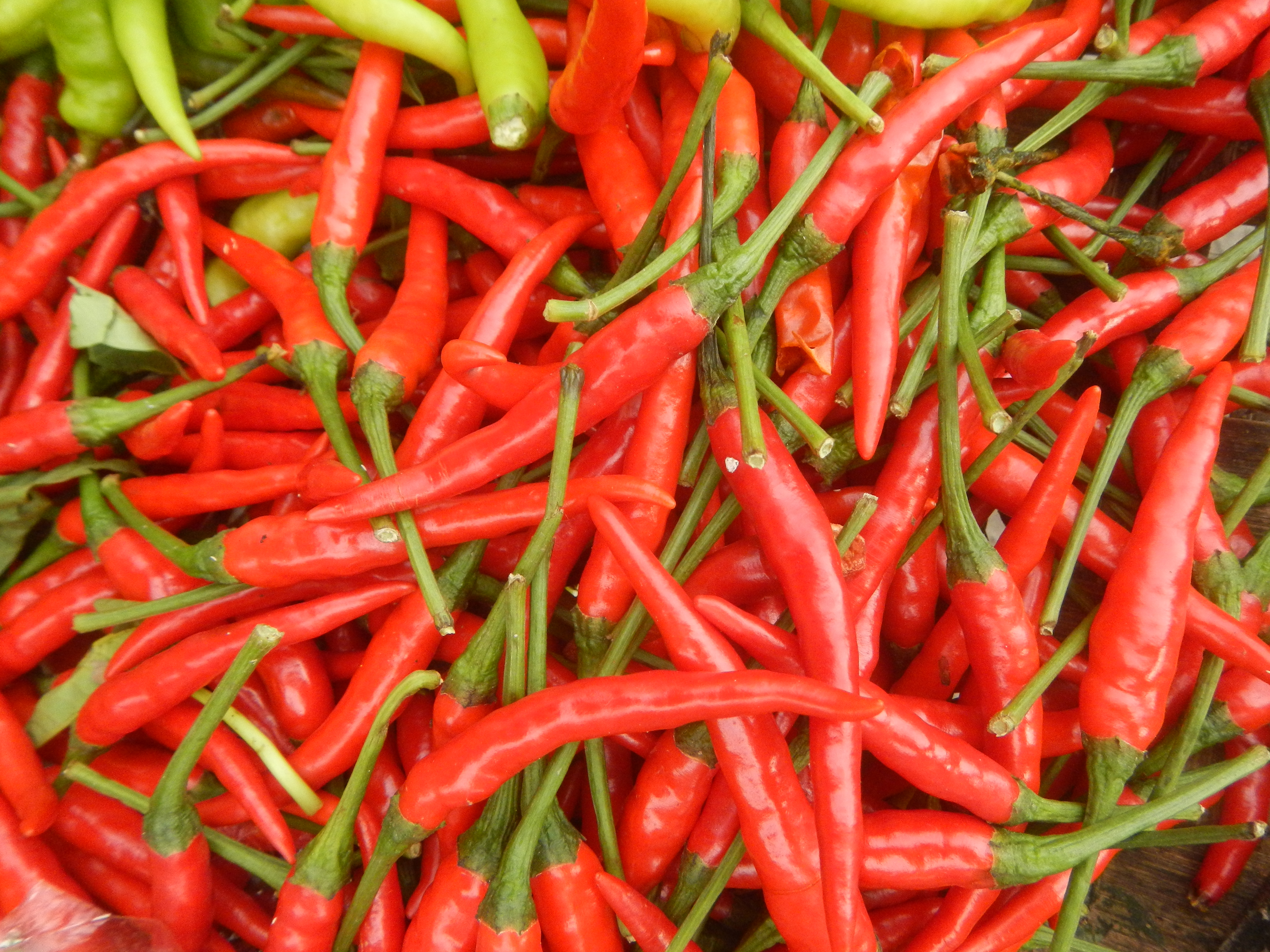
Siling tingala, a hybrid commonly mislabeled as siling labuyo in Luzon markets

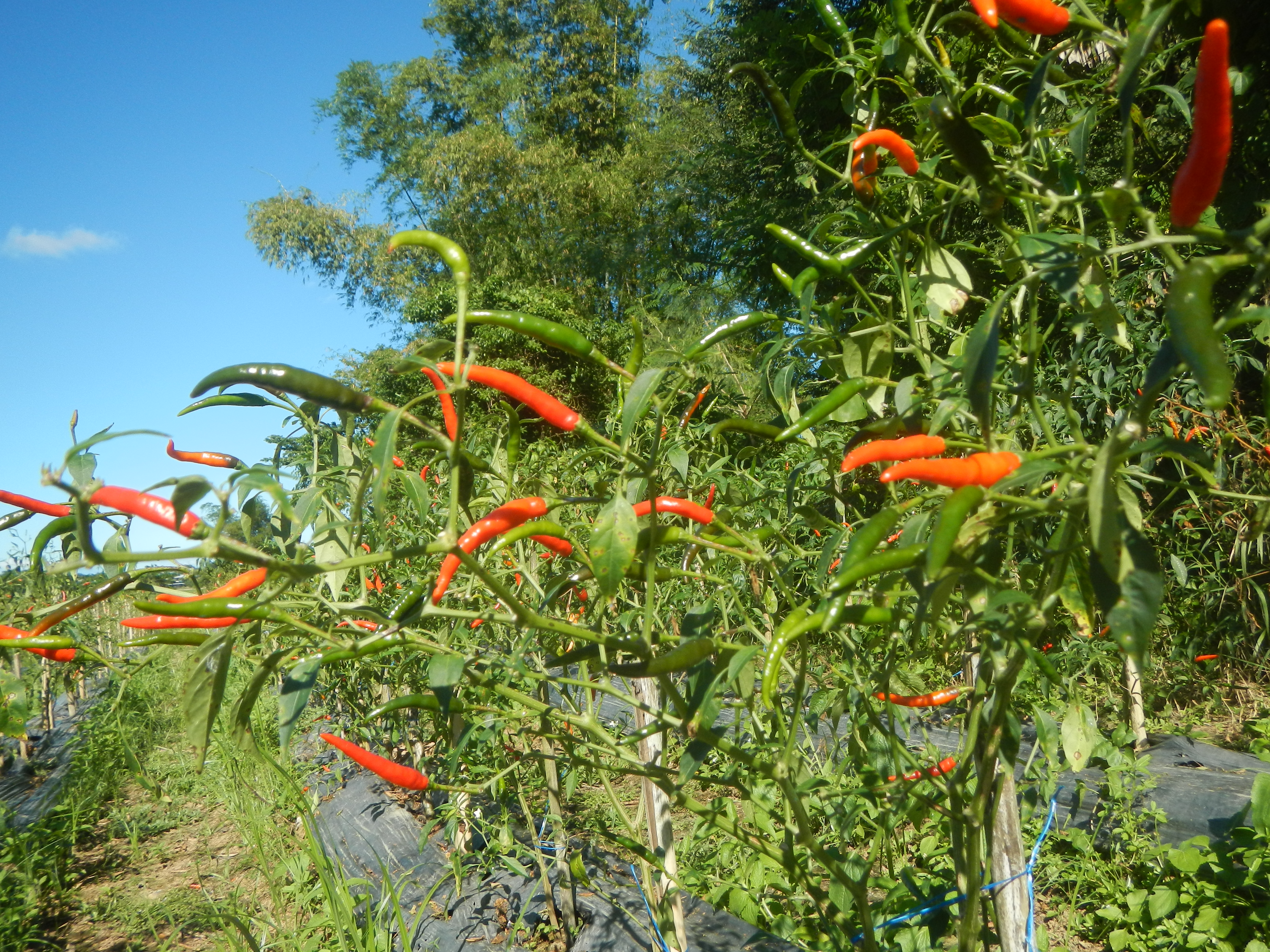
Siling tari, named after cockfighting spurs (tari), due to the direction of fruit growth. It is also commonly mislabeled as siling labuyo in markets.

== See also ==
- Siling haba
- Sili ice cream
- List of Capsicum cultivars
