= Beef shank =

Cut of beef

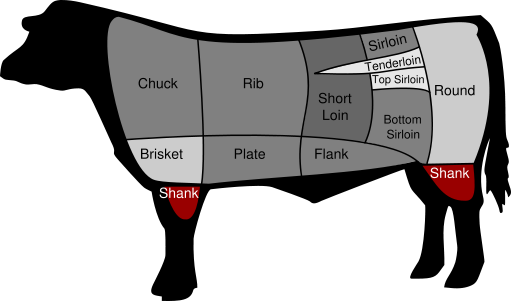
- US beef cuts
- Type: Beef steak

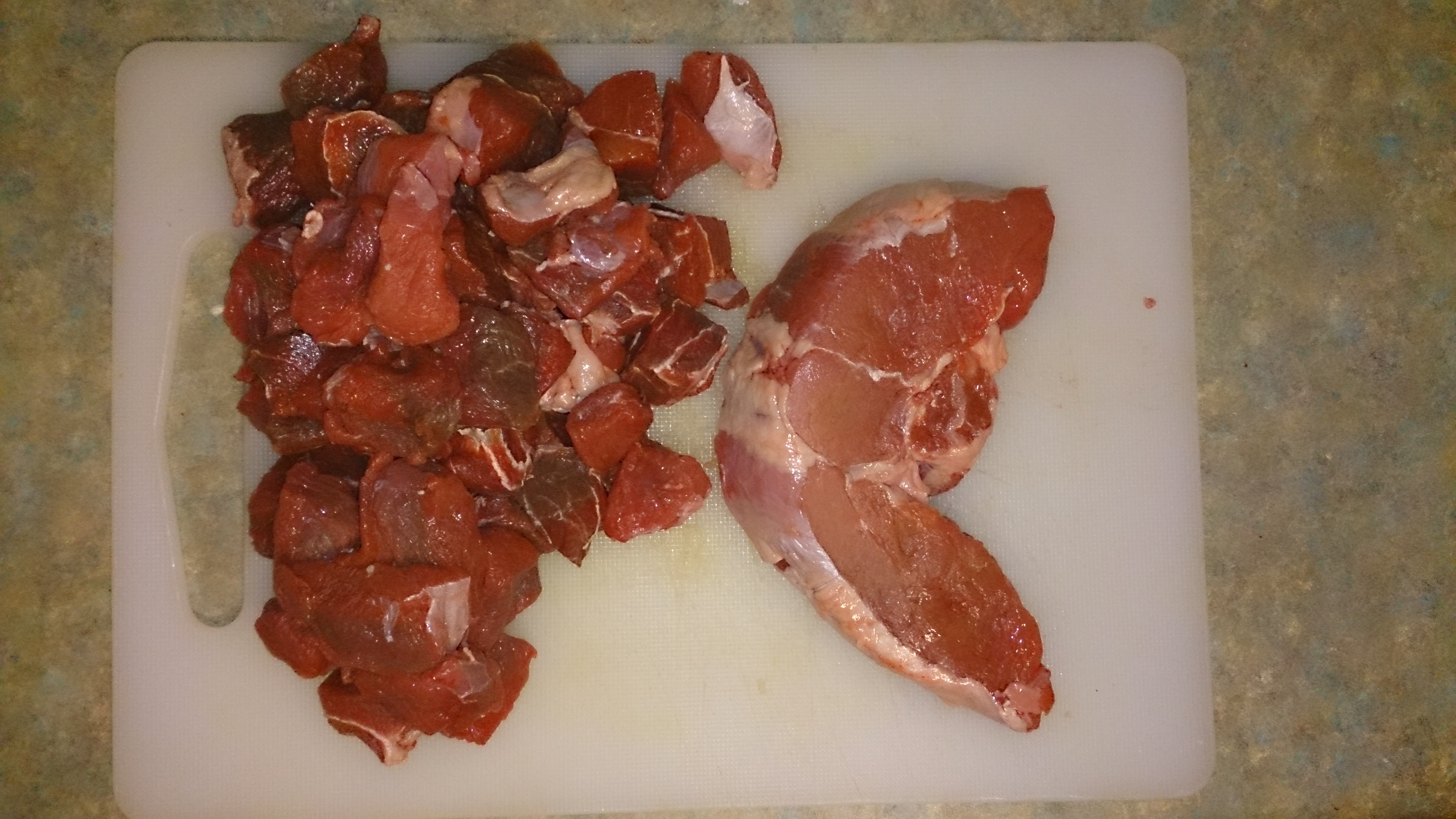
Cut and uncut beef shank (gravy beef)

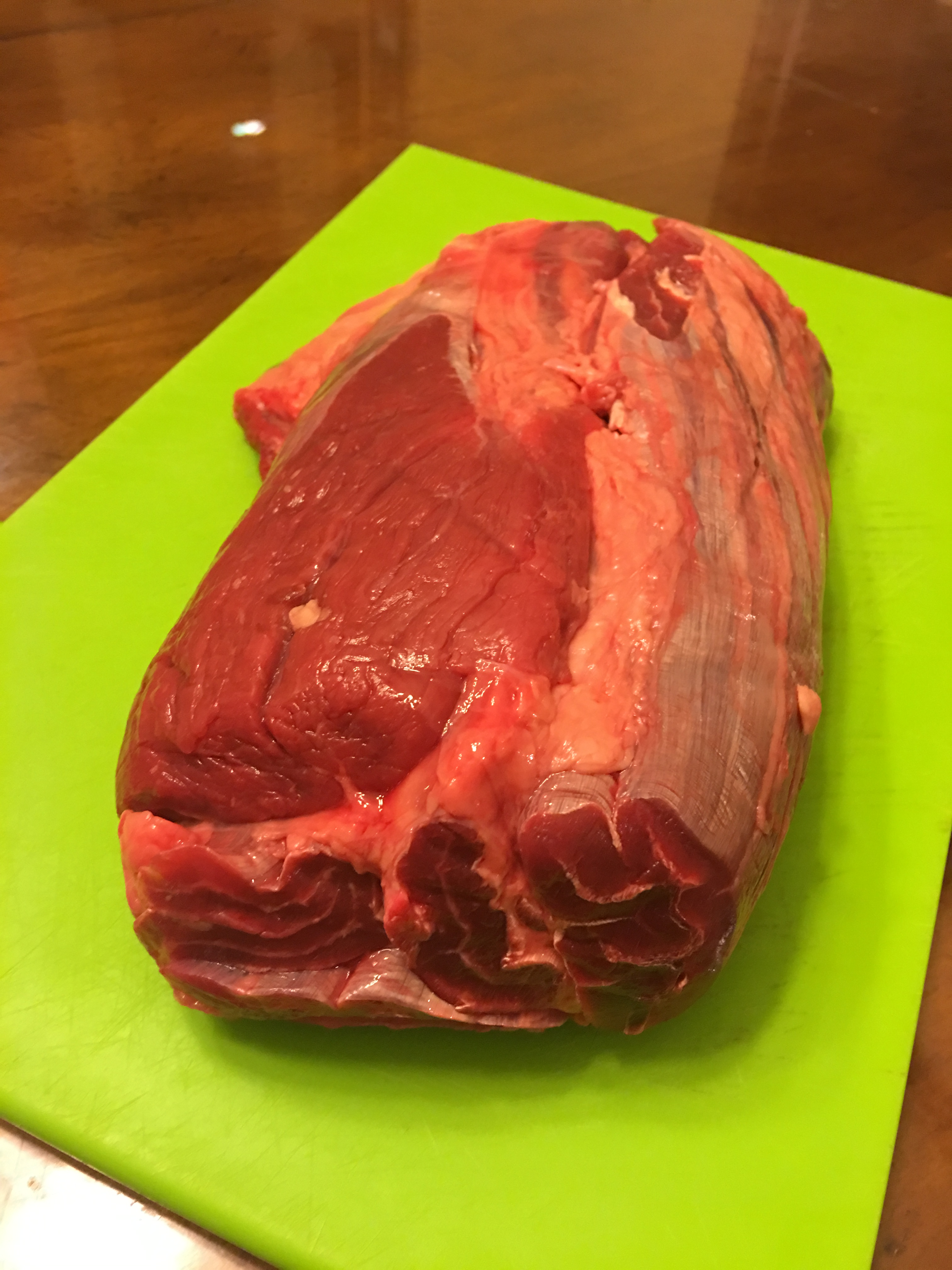
Raw beef shank, whole cut

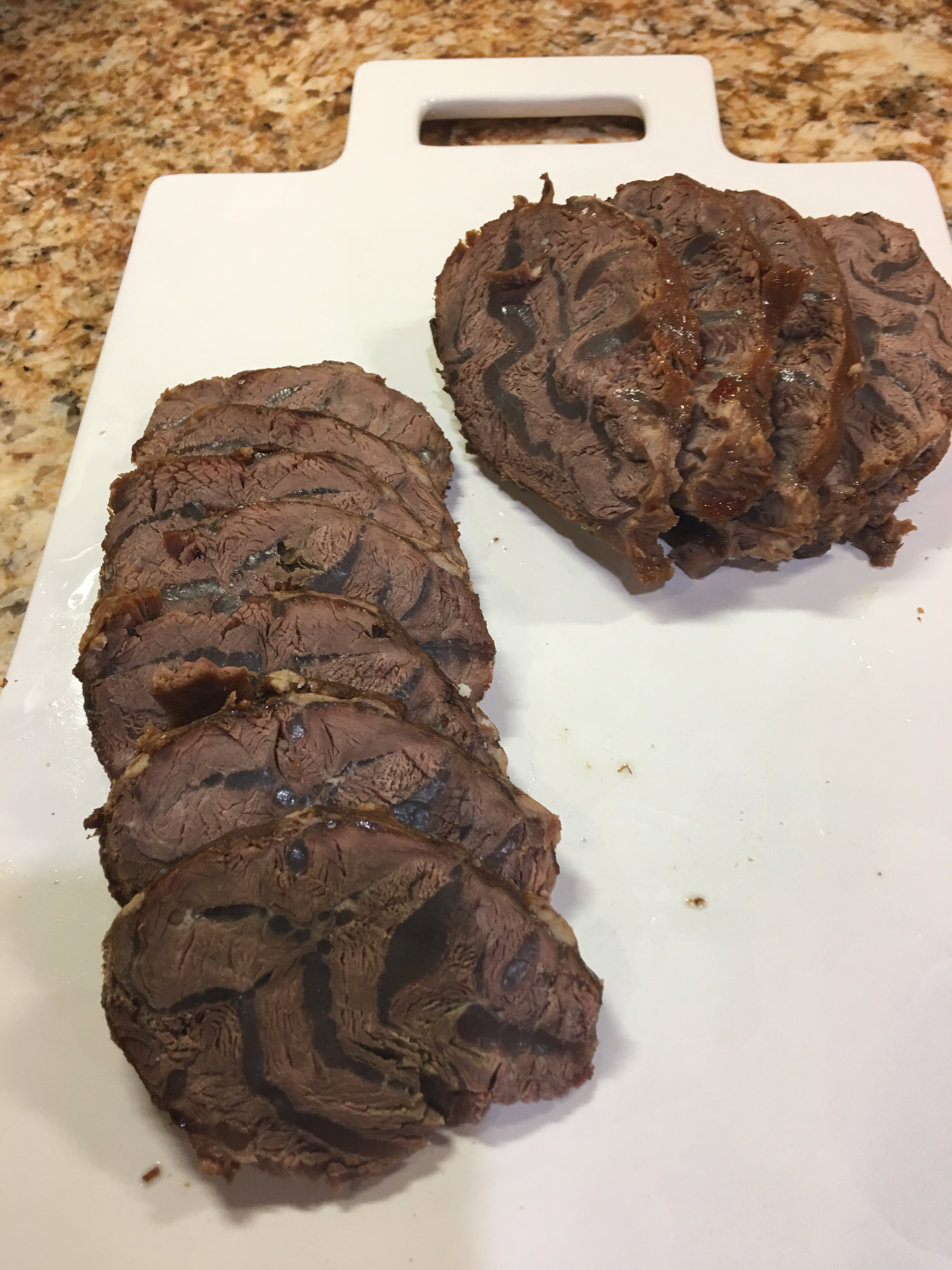
Braised beef shank

The beef shank is the leg portion of a steer or heifer. In the UK, the corresponding cuts of beef are the shin (the foreshank), and the leg (the hindshank).

Due to the constant use of this muscle by the animal, it tends to be tough, dry, and sinewy, so is best when cooked for a long time in moist heat. It is an ideal cut to use for beef bourguignon. As it is very lean, it is widely used to prepare very low-fat ground beef. Due to its lack of sales, it is not often seen in shops. However, if found in retail, it is very cheap and a low-cost ingredient for beef stock. Beef shank is a common ingredient in soups.

In Australia and New Zealand, it is commonly sold from butchers as gravy beef for boneless shanks or as osso buco with bone.

In Asia, braised beef shank is very popular.

== See also ==
- List of steak dishes
