= S. macrophyllus =

S. macrophyllus may refer to:

- Senecio macrophyllus, a synonym for Ligularia macrophylla
- Sicyos macrophyllus, a rare Hawaiian endemic
