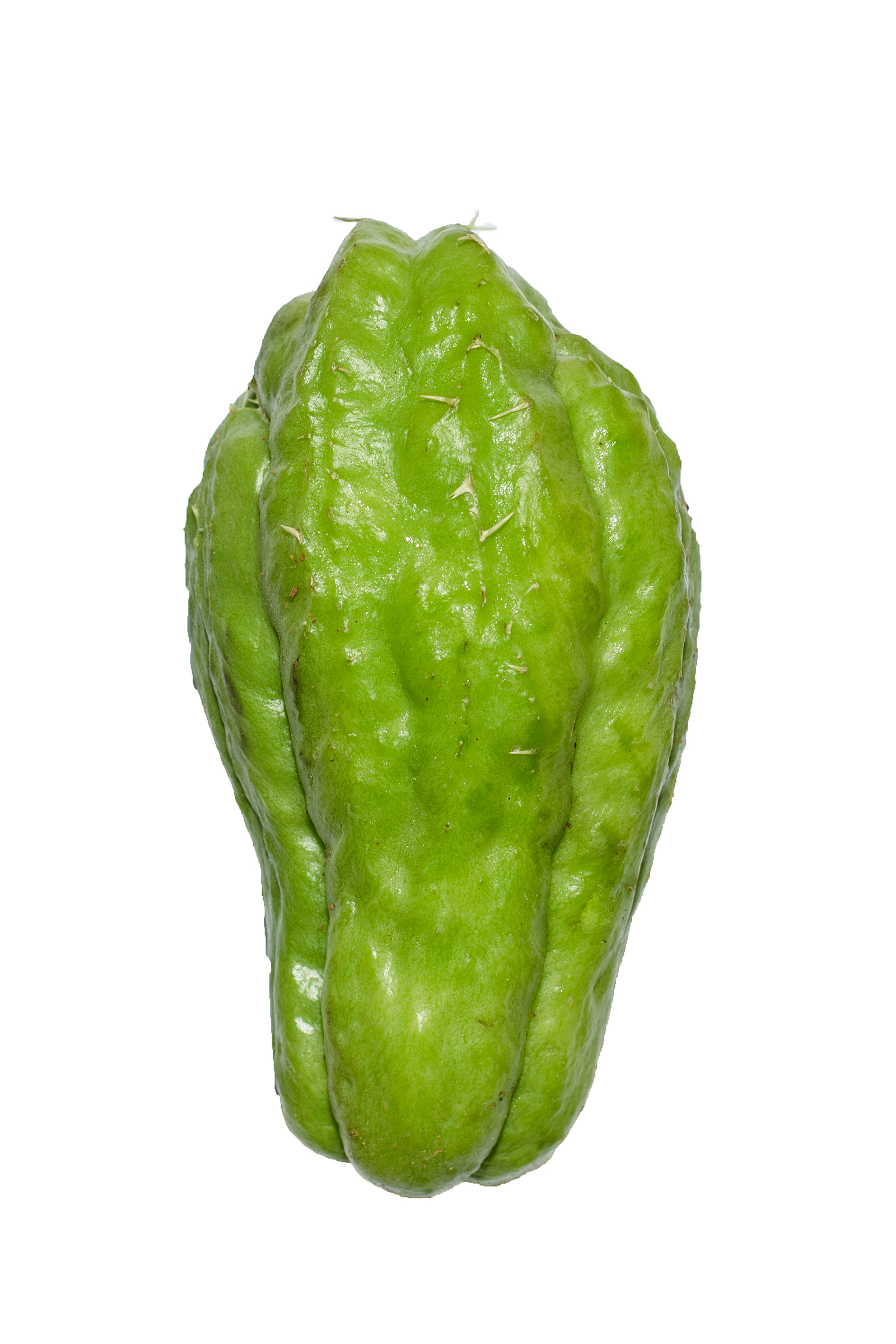
- Chayote fruit
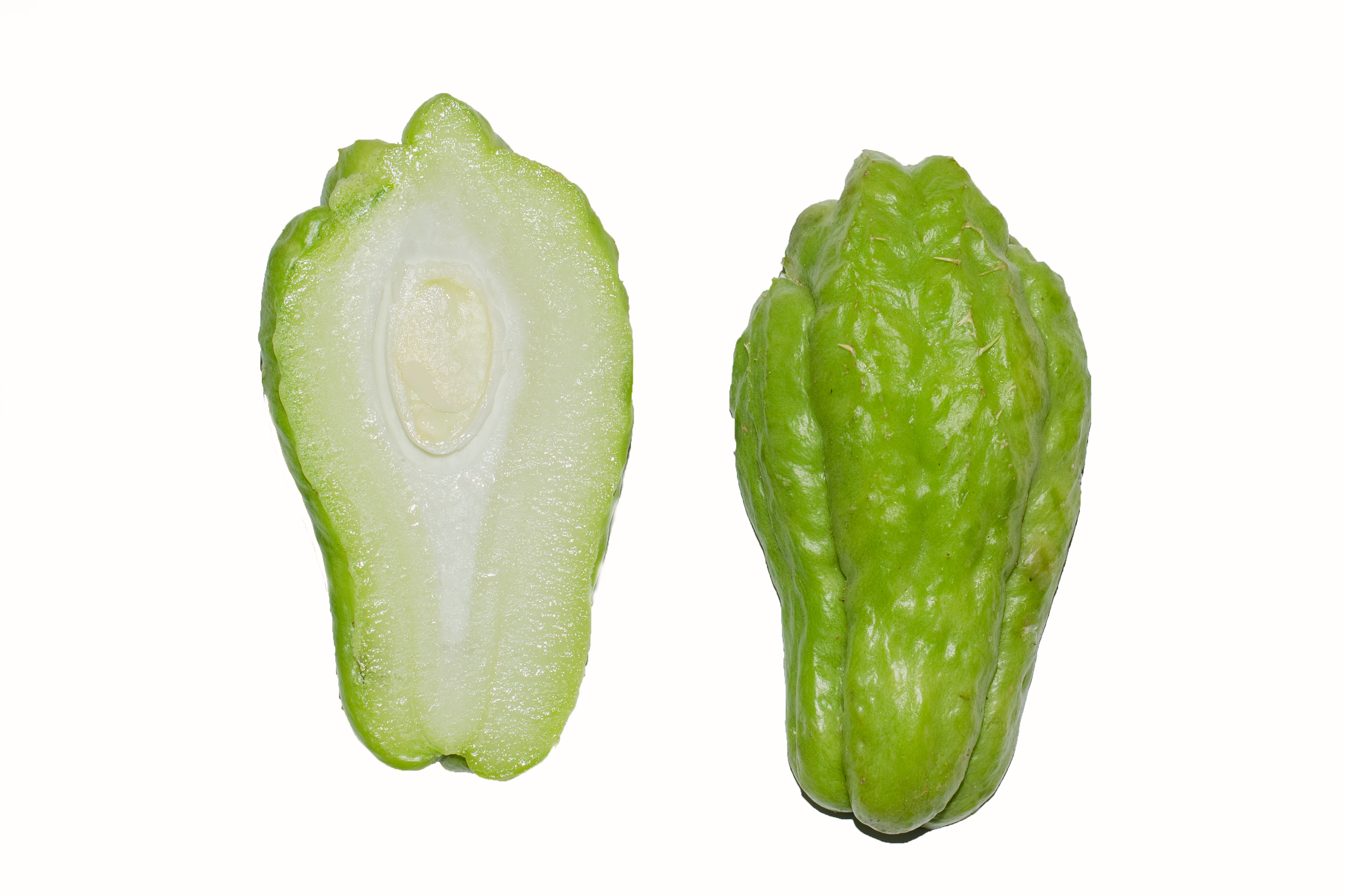
- Chayote fruit cut lengthwise

Scientific classification
- Kingdom: Plantae
- Clade: Tracheophytes
- Clade: Angiosperms
- Clade: Eudicots
- Clade: Rosids
- Order: Cucurbitales
- Family: Cucurbitaceae
- Genus: Sicyos
- Species: S. edulis

Binomial name
- Sicyos edulis Jacq.

Synonyms
- Chayota edulis Jacq.; Sechium edule (Jacq.)

= Chayote =

Edible fruiting vine of the gourd family

Chayote, fruit, raw
Nutritional value per 100 g (3.5 oz)
- Energy: 80 kJ (19 kcal)
- Carbohydrates: 4.51 g
- Sugars: 1.66 g
- Dietary fiber: 1.7 g
- Fat: 0.13 g
- Protein: 0.82 g
Vitamins and minerals
Vitamins	Quantity %DV^{†}
Thiamine (B1)	2% 0.025 mg
Riboflavin (B2)	2% 0.029 mg
Niacin (B3)	3% 0.47 mg
Pantothenic acid (B5)	5% 0.249 mg
Vitamin B6	4% 0.076 mg
Folate (B9)	23% 93 μg
Vitamin C	9% 7.7 mg
Vitamin E	1% 0.12 mg
Vitamin K	3% 4.1 μg
Minerals	Quantity %DV^{†}
Calcium	1% 17 mg
Iron	2% 0.34 mg
Magnesium	3% 12 mg
Manganese	8% 0.189 mg
Phosphorus	1% 18 mg
Potassium	4% 125 mg
Zinc	7% 0.74 mg
- Link to USDA Database entry
- ^{†}Percentages estimated using US recommendations for adults, except for potassium, which is estimated based on expert recommendation from the National Academies.

Chayote (/tʃaɪˈoʊteɪ/; previously placed in the obsolete genus Sechium, now in the genus Sicyos, as Sicyos edulis), also known as christophine, mirliton, güisquil, and choko, is an edible plant belonging to the gourd family, Cucurbitaceae. This fruit was first cultivated in Mesoamerica between southern Mexico and Honduras, with the most genetic diversity available in both Mexico and Guatemala. It is one among dozens of foods introduced to the Old World during the Columbian Exchange, particularly the galleon trades in Spanish Manila. At that time, the plant spread to other parts of the Americas, ultimately causing it to be integrated into the cuisine of many Latin American nations.

When cooked, chayote is usually handled like summer squash; it is generally lightly cooked to retain the crispy consistency. Raw chayote may be added to salads or salsas, most often marinated with lemon or lime juice, or eaten raw. Whether raw or cooked, chayote is a good source of Vitamin C.

Although most people consider only the fruit to be edible, the root, stem, seeds and leaves are edible as well. The tubers of the plant are eaten like potatoes and other root vegetables, while the shoots and leaves are often consumed in salads and stir fries, especially in Asia. In some cuisines, chayote is incorporated into soups and stews, where it absorbs surrounding flavors while maintaining a mild taste. It is also used in both savory and, less commonly, sweet dishes depending on regional culinary traditions.

== Names and etymology ==
The scientific name includes the name of the genus, Sicyos, which is a transliteration of the Greek name σίκυος, meaning "cucumber", and the species name edulis, which means "edible".

The fruit goes by many English-language names around the world. "Chayote", the common American English name of the fruit (outside of Louisiana) is from the Spanish word chayote, a derivative of the Nahuatl word chayohtli (pronounced [t͡ʃaˈjoʔt͡ɬi]). The Nahuatl-derived name is preserved in the Philippines, where it is known as sayote or tsayote. It is also known as güisquil in Guatemala, El Salvador, and pataste in Honduras.

In Louisiana and Haiti it is known as "mirliton" (English: /ˈmɪərlətɒn/) also spelled "mirleton" or "merleton" in the United Kingdom. The r is often silent, e.g. Cajun me-lay-taw).

In the eastern Caribbean, the United Kingdom and Ireland, it is known as "christophine" or "christophene" (from French, a reference to Christopher Columbus).

In other parts of the world, the English name is often "cho cho", "chouchou" (e.g. in Mauritius), or a variant thereof (e.g. "chow-chow" in India and Sri Lanka, "chuchu" in Brazil, and "chocho" in Jamaica). This name may have originated from Pidgin English for "chayote". In Nepal it is known as Es-kus.

In Australia, New Zealand and Singapore, it is known as "choko". The name is derived from Cantonese, from Chinese immigrants to Australia and New Zealand in the late 19th century.

Chayote is also sometimes referred to as "vegetable pear".

In Indonesia, chayote is known by several names: labu (squash) siam, labu Jepang and manisah in Javanese. Beside the fruits, the leaves are popular as a vegetable.

Chayote arrived to the southern Italian region of Campania in the early 16th Century. Spain conquered the Kingdom of Naples in 1503 and connected it to the wider network of commercial and military routes that included the American colonies. Chayote spread pretty rapidly but was never cultivated at scale. It is known in Naples markets as "melanzana dei francesi" (aubergine of the French) or "melanzana spinosa" (thorny aubergine) and "zucchina spinosa" (thorny zucchini), due to the fact that local varieties have thorns. Also known as "masciusce" (a name that suggests a connection with Brazilian "maxixe" and Kimbundu ma'xixi, indicating the thorny, tiny maroon cucumber), it is being "rediscovered" as a forgotten, local wild fruit and its colonial origins are still little known.

== Cultivation ==
Like other members of the gourd family, chayote has a sprawling habit, and requires sufficient room. The roots are also highly susceptible to rot, especially in containers, and the plant in general is finicky to grow. However, in Australia and New Zealand it is an easily grown yard or garden plant, set on a chicken wire support or strung against a fence. In Trinidad and Tobago, it is grown in the mountainous areas strung from wire lines. In Latin America, chayote is widely cultivated. Depending on variety and region, yield reaches from 10 to 115 t/ha.

=== Soil and climate requirements ===
Chayote requires humus-rich, well drained soils, which are slightly acid to acid (pH 4.5 to 6.5). Clay soils reduce crop productivity because they retain water and therefore promote growth of fungal pests. Chayote adapts to a wide range of climatic conditions but grows best in regions with average temperatures of 13–21 °C (55-70°F) with at least 1500–2000 mm(59-79 inches) of annual precipitation. The crop is not frost-tolerant, however it can be grown as an annual in temperate regions.

== Taxonomy ==
The plant was first recorded by modern botanists in P. Browne's 1756 work, the Civil and Natural History of Jamaica. Swartz included it in 1800 in its current genus Sechium.

The genus name Sicyos is a transliteration of the Ancient Greek σίκυος : síkyos "cucumber". The species name edulis means "edible".

== Description ==
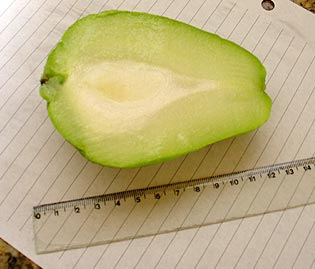
Cut chayote showing seed

In the most common variety, the fruit is roughly pear-shaped, somewhat flattened and with coarse wrinkles, ranging from 10–25 cm (3.9–9.8 in) long, with thin green skin fused with green to white flesh, and a single, large, flattened stone. This seed or stone can be up to 10 cm (3.9 in) long by 7 cm (2.8 in) wide. Some varieties have spiny fruits. Depending on the variety, a single fruit can weigh up to 1.2 kg. The flesh has a very watery but complex taste and the texture is described as a cross between a potato and a cucumber. Natives describe the spiny varieties as being more flavorful than the spineless ones.

The chayote vine can be grown on the ground, but as a climbing plant, it will grow onto anything, and can easily rise as high as 12 m (39 ft) when support is provided. It has heart-shaped leaves, 10–25 cm (3.9–9.8 in) wide and tendrils on the stem. The plant bears male flowers in clusters and solitary female flowers.

== Culinary uses ==
Although many people are familiar only with the fruit as being edible, the root, stem, seeds and leaves are edible as well. The tubers of the plant are eaten like potatoes and other root vegetables, while the shoots and leaves are often consumed in salads and stir-fries. Tubers are known as "chin-chayote" in central México.

The fruit does not need to be peeled to be cooked or fried in slices. It has a very mild, lightly sweet flavor while the seeds have a nutty taste. It is commonly served with seasonings or in a dish with other vegetables and flavorings. It can also be boiled, stuffed, mashed, baked, fried, or pickled in escabeche sauce. Both fruit and seed are rich in amino acids and vitamin C. Fresh green fruit are firm and without brown spots or signs of sprouting; smaller fruit are usually more tender. Chayote can be sliced lengthwise and eaten using salad dressing dip. The seed is edible and is sometimes served cold, dipped in dressing. There are two varieties available; dark green and light green. The dark green variety is much more tender than the lighter one, which develops a fibrous texture around its seed if harvesting or consumption is delayed.

The tuberous part of the root is starchy and eaten like a yam; it can be fried. It can be used as pig or cattle fodder.

=== North America ===
Culinary use of the chayote in North America has tended to be regional. In Louisiana Creole and Cajun cuisine, the fruit is a popular seasonal dish for the holidays, especially around Thanksgiving, in a variety of recipes.

David Fairchild was a botanist who tried to introduce it to wider use in the southern United States, and describes the plant and early experiences with it in a journal article in 1947.

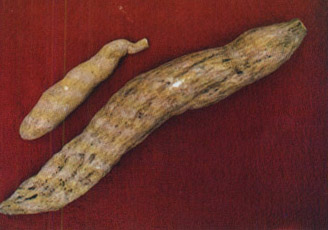
Ichintal (chayote root)

Chayote is an important part of traditional diets across Mesoamerica, and can be found in a variety of dishes. In this region, it is often known as güisquil, or huisquil, derived from the Nahuatl term huitzli. In Guatemala, güisquil specifically refers to the darker variety of the fruit, while the lighter, yellower variety is called perulero. The root, known as ichintal, is also a seasonal delicacy there. The fruit of the chayote is used in a type of Guatemalan chilaquiles called caldos, where a piece of cheese is placed between two slices of chayote and then dipped in egg batter and fried.

In Eastern Caribbean English the fruit, used as a vegetable, is known as christophene. In Jamaica and other places in the western Caribbean it is known as chocho. The fruit is called tayota in the Dominican Republic.

=== South America ===
In Brazil (locally called chuchu) and other Latin American countries, it is breaded and fried, or used cooked in salads, soups, stews and soufflés. 'Chuchu' (or 'Xuxú') is also a term of endearment in Brazil, like 'Honey' in English.

=== Asia ===
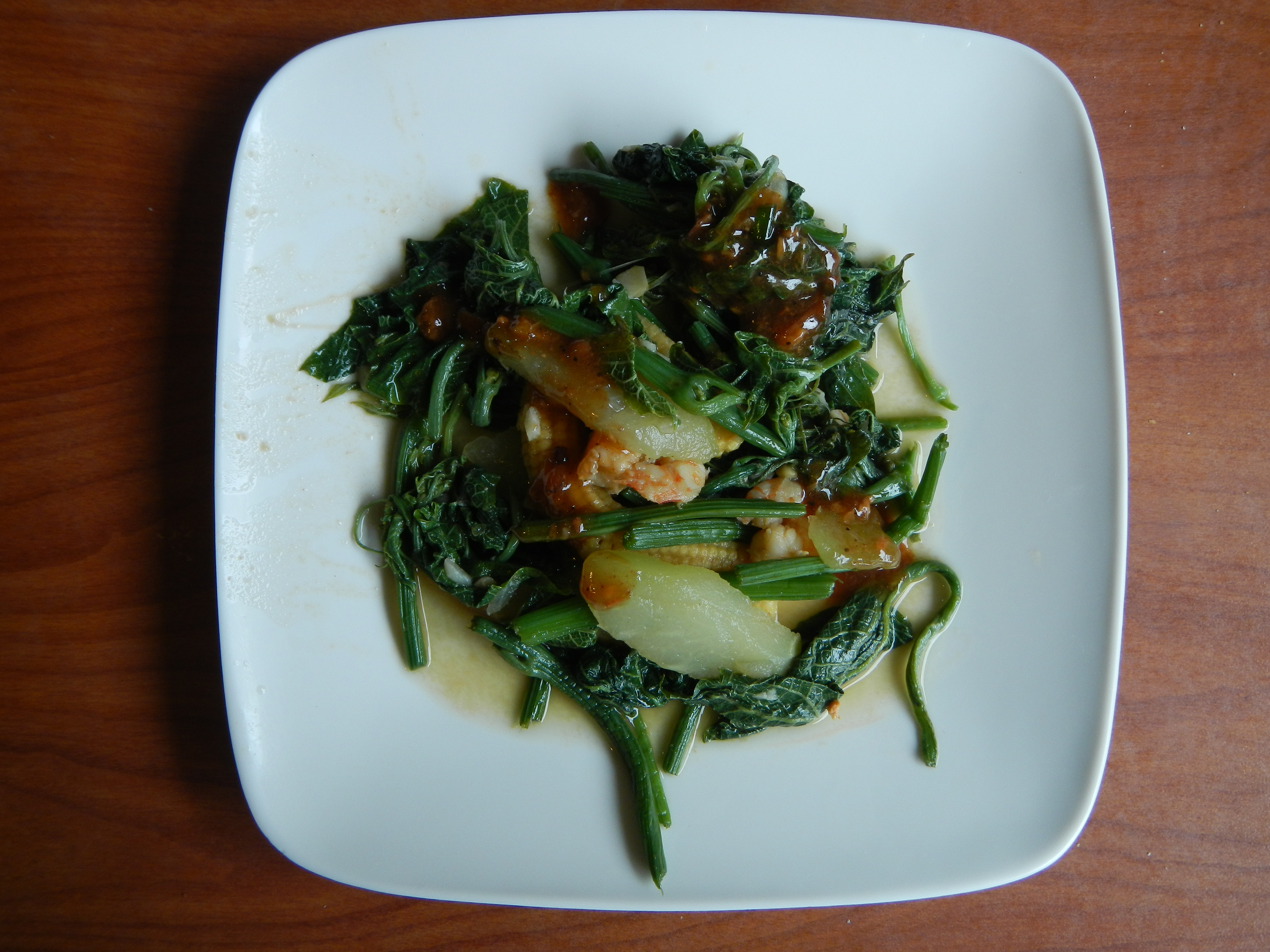
A Filipino side dish with diced chayote and chayote tops

Chayote is widely used in Southeast Asia. In the Philippines, the plant is generally known as sayote in Filipino (also chayote, tsayote, salyote, sayyot, kayote, etc. in other Philippine languages, all derived from Spanish chayote or cayote). It is grown mostly in mountainous parts of the country such as Benguet and parts of Cordillera Administrative Region. Chayote is used in many kinds of dishes such as soup (such as sinigang and tinola, often as a substitute for upo squash), stir-fried vegetables and chop suey. It was among the numerous vegetables, grains, and fruits introduced into the country directly from Mexico via the Manila galleon trade.

In Indonesia, chayotes or labu siam are widely planted for their shoots and fruit. (Labu siam, literally "Siamese gourd", is used in both Indonesia and Malaysia.) It is generally used in Sundanese food as lalap and one of ingredients for Sundanese cuisine called sayur asem, as well as one of ingredients for Javanese cuisine called sayur lodeh. In Timor-Leste, chayote is called lakeru Japones. It is speculated that chayote was introduced by Japanese soldiers during World War II. In Vietnam, chayote is called su su and is served in sautés, stir-fries and soups. In Thai cuisine, the plant is known as sayongte (Thai: ซายองเต้) or fak maeo (Thai: ฟักแม้ว, literally meaning "Miao melon"). It grows mainly in the mountains of northern Thailand. The young shoots and greens are often eaten stir-fried or in certain soups. In Burma, the chayote is known as Gurkha thee or "Gurkha fruit" (ဂေါ်ရခါးသီး) and is cheap and popular.

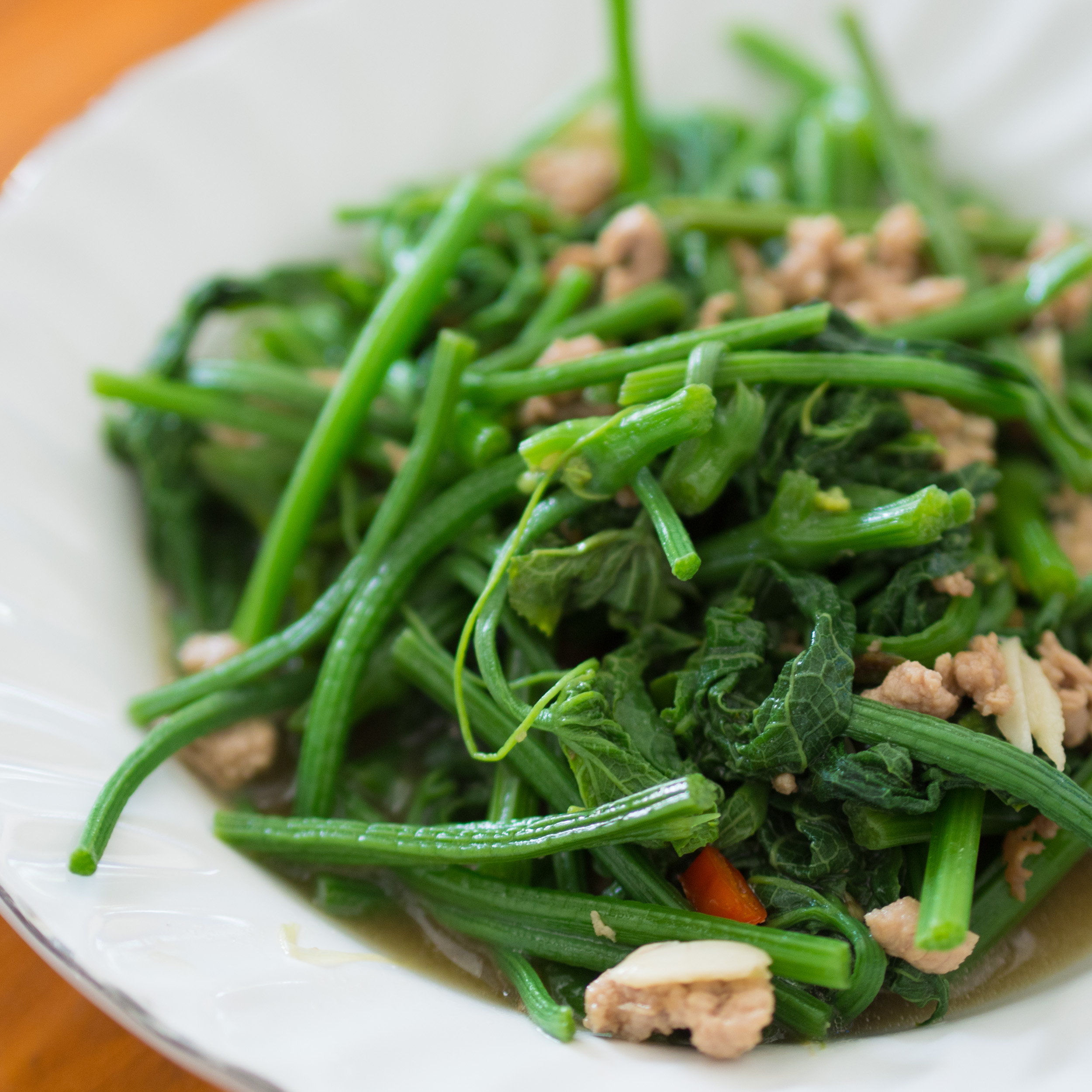
Phat yot sayongte: Thai for stir-fried chayote shoots

Chayote is also frequently eaten in South Asia. In eastern and north eastern India and Nepal, the plant and fruit is called squash or ishkus (इस्कुस in Nepali), probably derived from the English word squash. Its shoots, fruit and roots are widely used for different varieties of curries. In the Indian state of West Bengal, it is generally known as squash (স্কোয়াশ). The whole vegetable is used to make curries, or it is sauteed. It is also cooked with fish, eggs or mutton. It is largely eaten during the summer and rainy season as it contains lots of water and is a good source of vitamin C. The young branches are also considered for making items as saag or can be added into preparing shukto. In Tamil Nadu, South India, chayote is known as maerakkai (மேரக்காய்) or chow-chow (சௌ சௌ) in Tamil and widely used in everyday cooking for recipes like sambar, kootu, poriyal, thuvayal, chutney and mor-kulambu. Also Chow-Chow (චව් චව්) is the common name used in the markets in Sri Lanka, in the Sinhala language. In Karnataka, South India, chayote is popularly referred to as seeme badanekaayi (ಸೀಮೆ ಬದನೇಕಾಯಿ) in Kannada or "Bangalore brinjal"; "brinjal/eggplant/aubergine of the plateau". It is used in vegetable stews like sambar and palya.

In temperate Northeast Asia, chayote is less common. In Korea, chayote is also known as chayote (차요테) and is commonly used as a side dish in either pickled or marinated form. This fruit is most commonly pickled with vinegar and soy sauce (chayote-jangajji; 차요테장아찌), or marinated and dressed with sauces and spices into a salad (chayote-muchim; 차요테무침). In China, the chayote is known as the "Buddha's palm" (Chinese: 佛手瓜; pinyin: fóshǒu guā) or alternatively in Cantonese choko (cau1 kau4) 秋球 [lit. autumn ball] or Chinese: 合掌瓜, and is generally stir-fried. In tropical Taiwan and southern China, chayotes are widely planted for their shoots, known as lóngxūcài (simplified Chinese: 龙须菜; traditional Chinese: 龍鬚菜; lit. 'dragon-whisker vegetable'). Along with the young leaves, the shoots are a commonly consumed vegetable in the region.

=== Africa ===
Chayote is commonly eaten in the islands of the Indian Ocean. In Réunion, the French overseas territory near Mauritius, chou chou, as it is known, is served in many dishes especially in the highlands. A popular starter is chou chou au gratin (baked with a cheese sauce), served as a side with a meal or as a dessert. In Mauritius, it is called sousou and is cultivated in the high plateau of the island. Mixed with beef, pork or chicken, chou chou is widely used to make steamed Chinese-style dumplings called niouk yen (boulette chou chou) or chow mai. Stems and leaves are consumed in bouillon to accompany rice and other dishes. The chou chou is also consumed as pickle, salad, gratin, curry and sauté with beef, egg or chicken. In Madagascar, chayote (known in Malagasy as sôsety) is eaten in dishes such as saosisy sy sôsety (sausage and chayote) and tilapia sy sôsety (tilapia and chayote).

=== Europe ===
In the Portuguese Autonomous Regions of Madeira and Azores, where the vegetable is popular, chayote is called pimpinela (or pepinela) and caiota, respectively. In both regions, chayote is part of the local gastronomy, usually cooked with beans in the shell, potatoes, and corn cobs to accompany fish dishes, usually caldeiradas. In the Azores, chayote is also used in puddings and jams. On the Mediterranean island of Malta, it is a popular vegetable grown mainly by hobby farmers or as a side-product. In the Maltese language, it is known as ċentinarja, and is mainly used in thick vegetable soups, or as a side-vegetable.

== Folklore ==
=== Chayote as mock apple pie ===
In Australia, a persistent urban legend is that McDonald's apple pies were made of chokos (chayotes), not apples. This eventually led McDonald's to emphasise the fact that real apples are used in their pies. This legend was based on an earlier belief that tinned pears were often disguised chayotes. A possible explanation for the rumor is that there are a number of recipes in Australia that advise chayotes can be used in part replacement of canned apples to make the fruit go farther in making apple pies. This likely arose because of the economies of "mock" food substitutes during the Depression Era, shortages of canned fruit in the years following World War II, and the fact that apples do not grow in many tropical and subtropical parts of Australia, making them scarce. Chayotes, on the other hand, grow extensively in Australia, with many suburban backyards featuring chayote vines growing along their fence lines and outhouses.

Many modern keto diet recipes take advantage of chayote fruit's low carb count and apple-like cooked texture as a substitute in high-carb apple desserts.

=== Chayote as a mummification agent ===
Due to its purported cell-regenerative properties, it is believed as a contemporary legend that this fruit caused the mummification of people from the Colombian town of San Bernardo who extensively consumed it. The very well preserved skin and flesh can be seen in the mummies today.

== Gallery ==
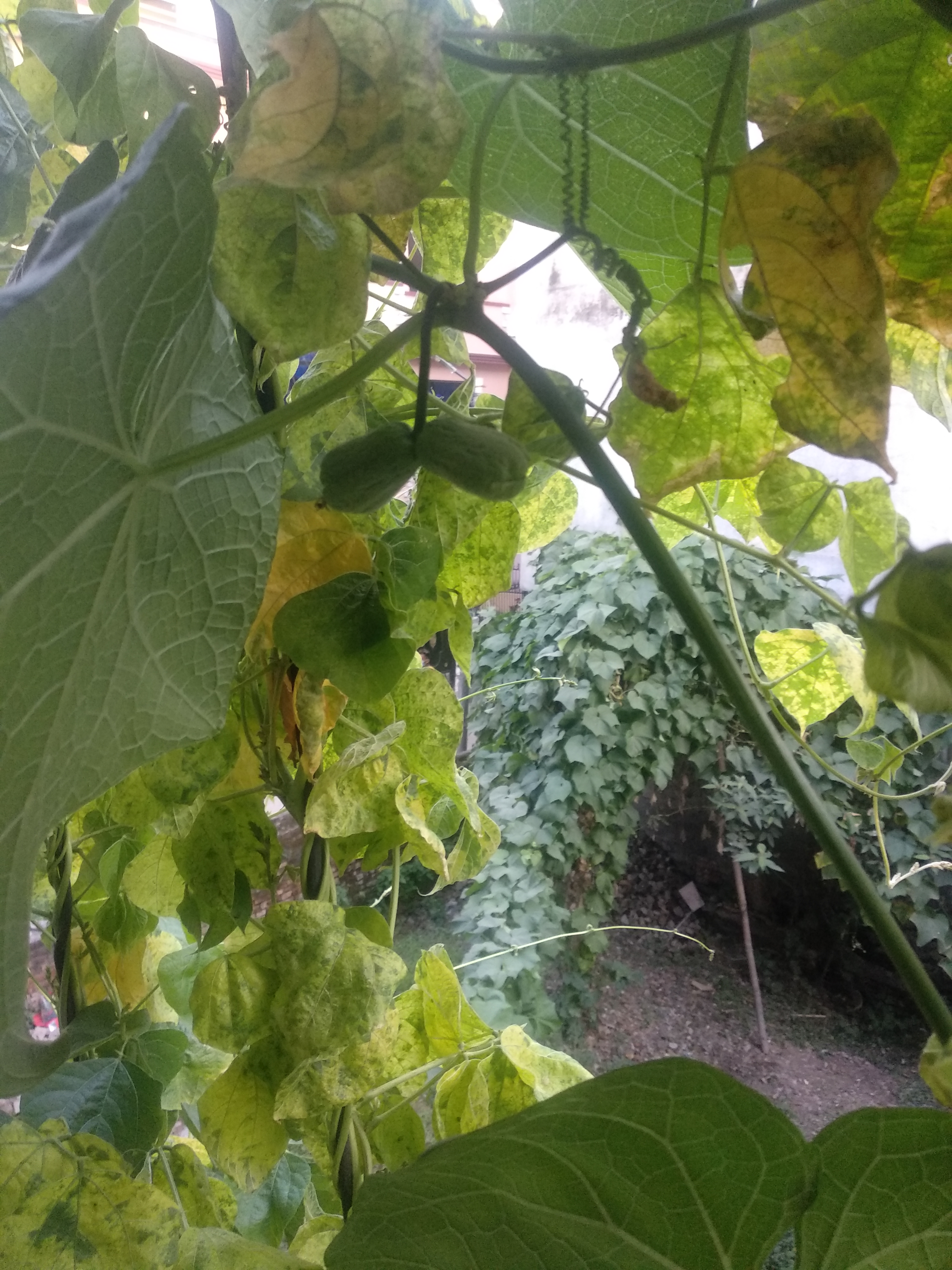
Baby Chayote fruits in the rooftop garden (Nepal)

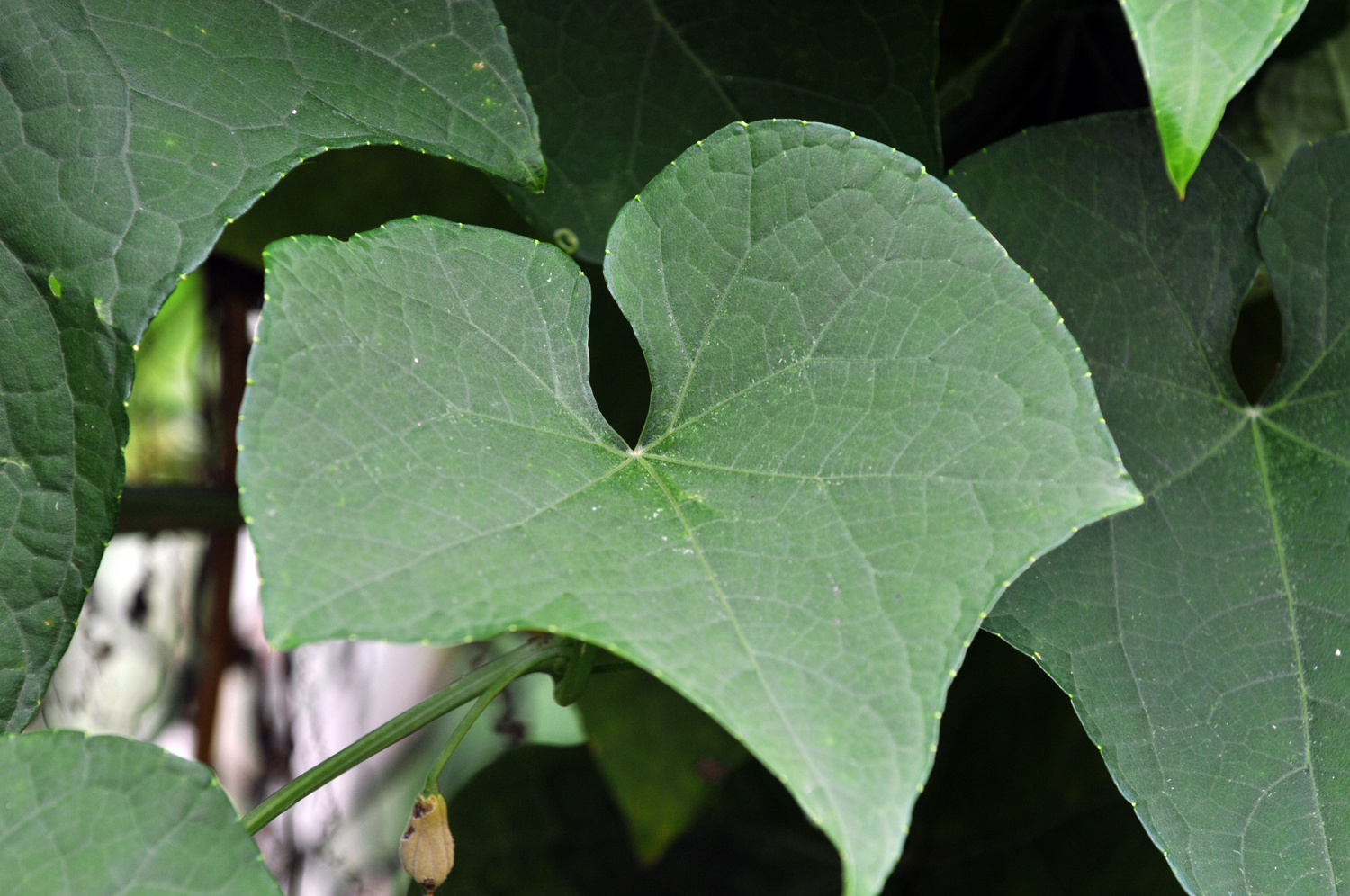
Chayote leaf (Vietnam)

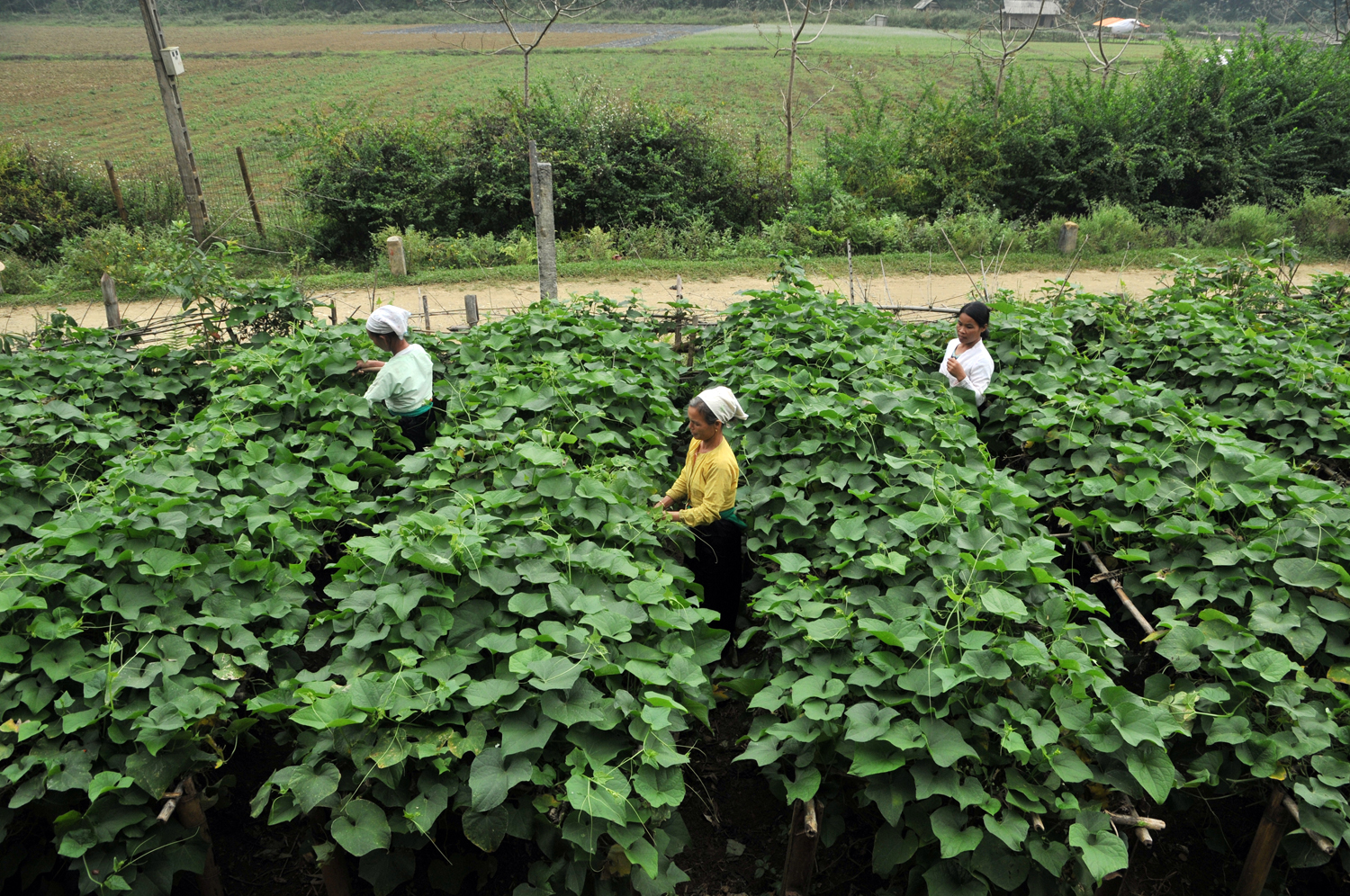
Picking chayote (Vietnam)

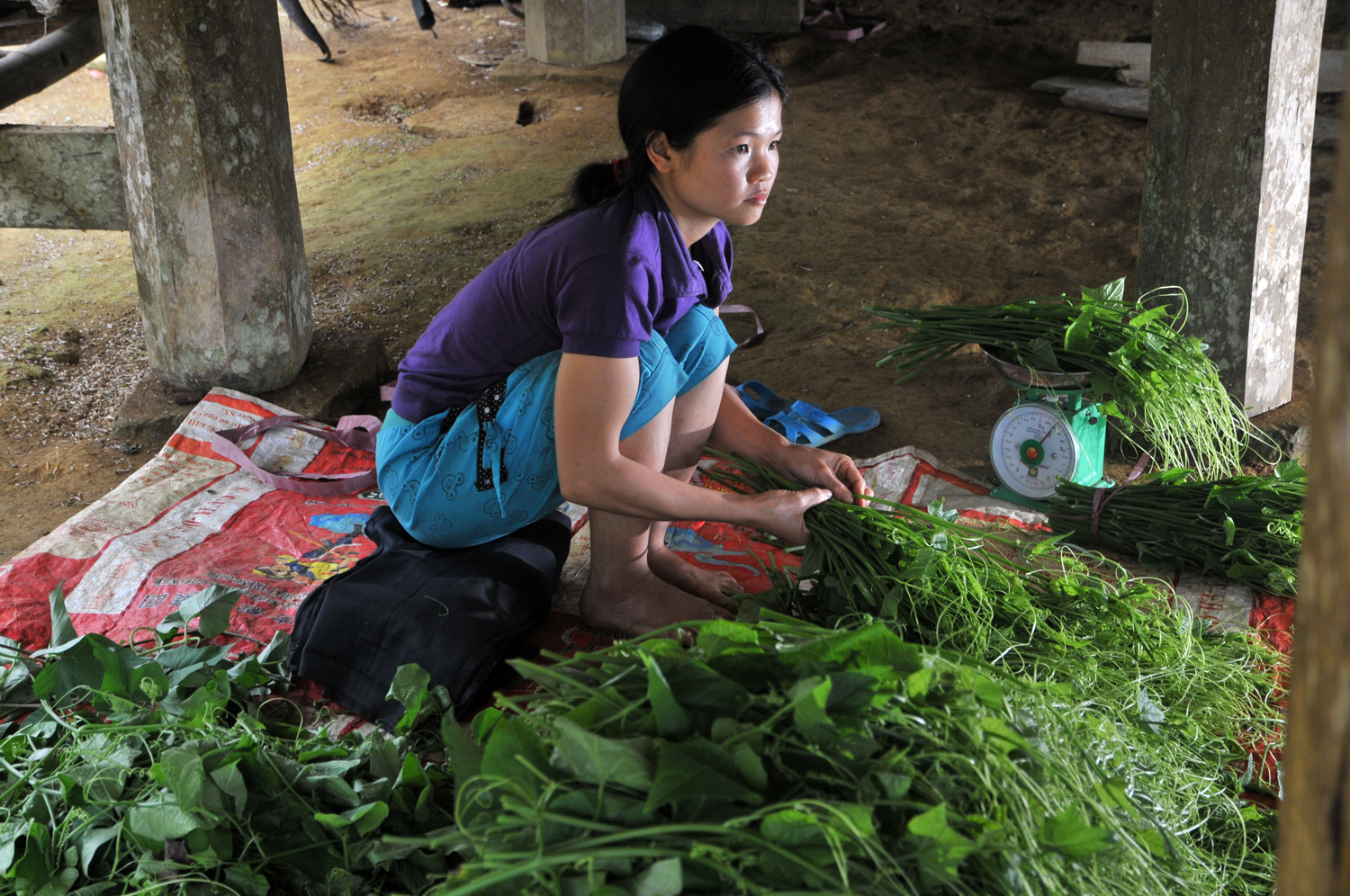
Weighing and preparing chayote shoots (Vietnam)

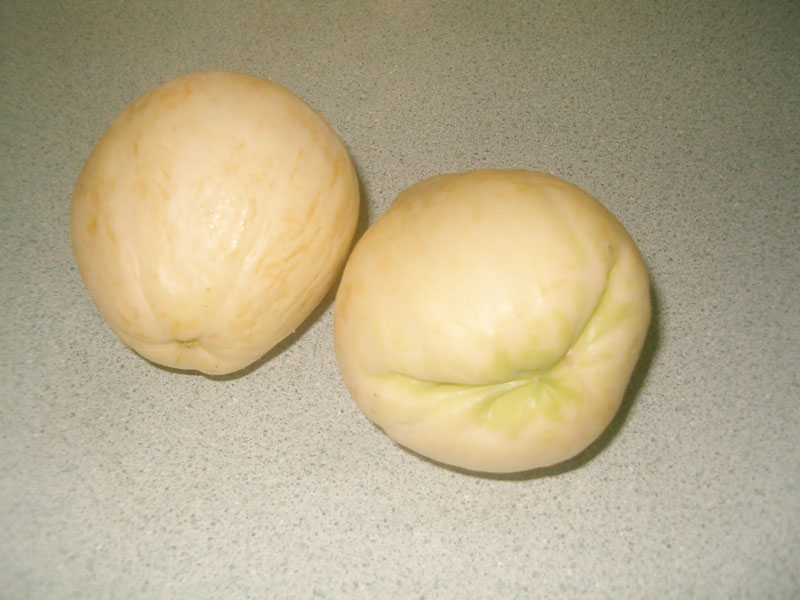
Perulero, a yellowish-white variety (Guatemala)

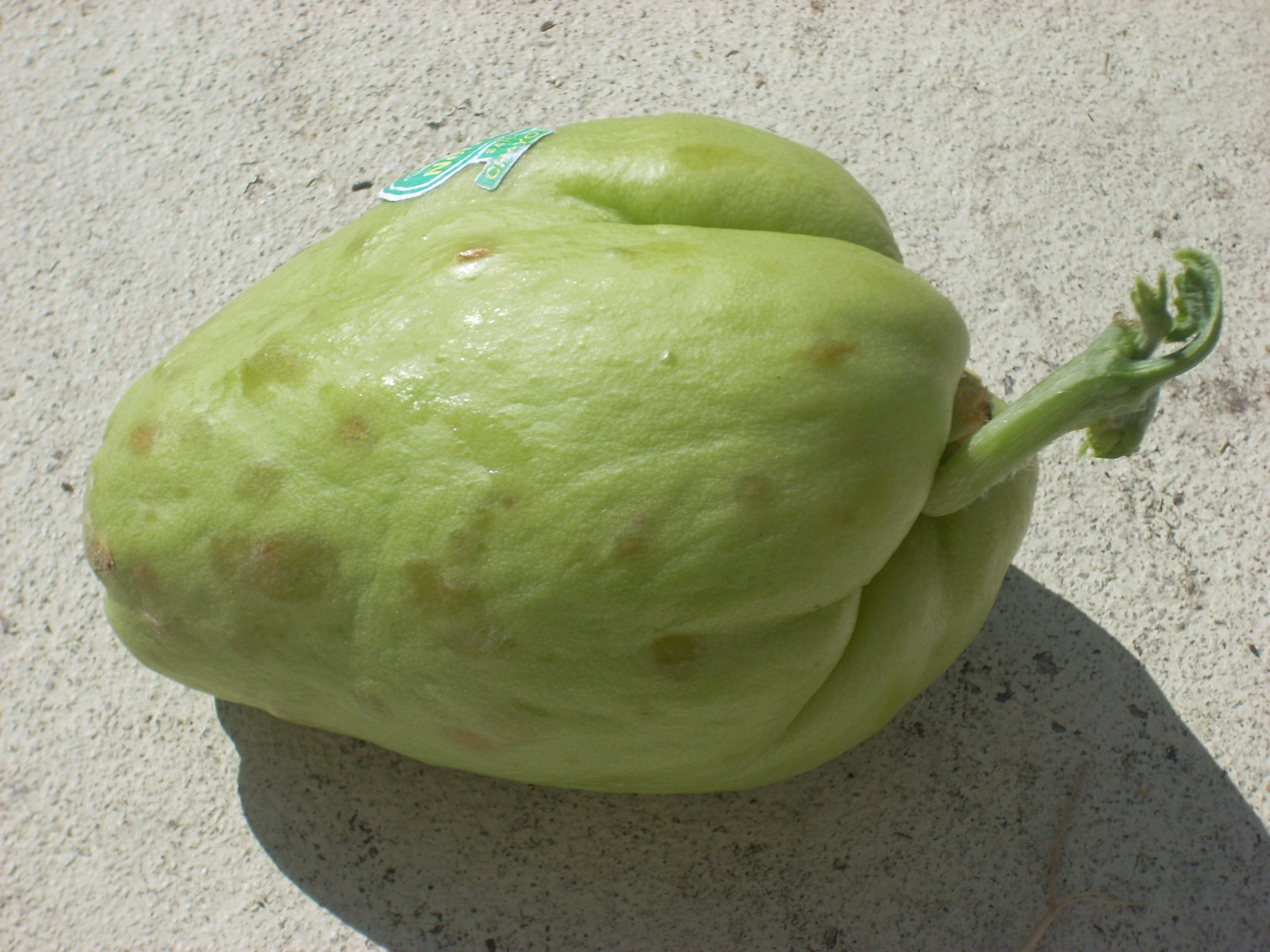
Sprouting chayote

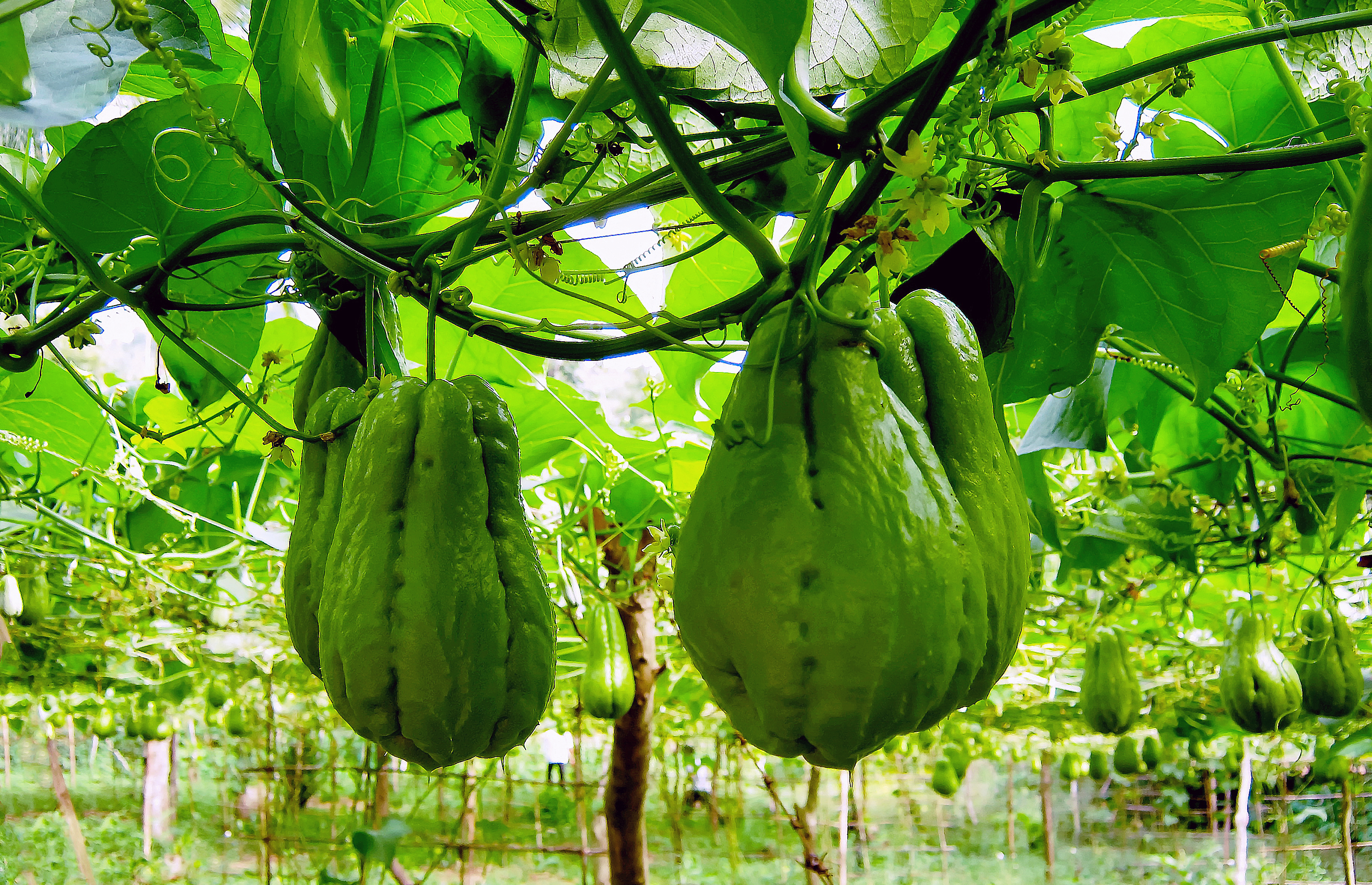
Chayote growing on vines (Vietnam)

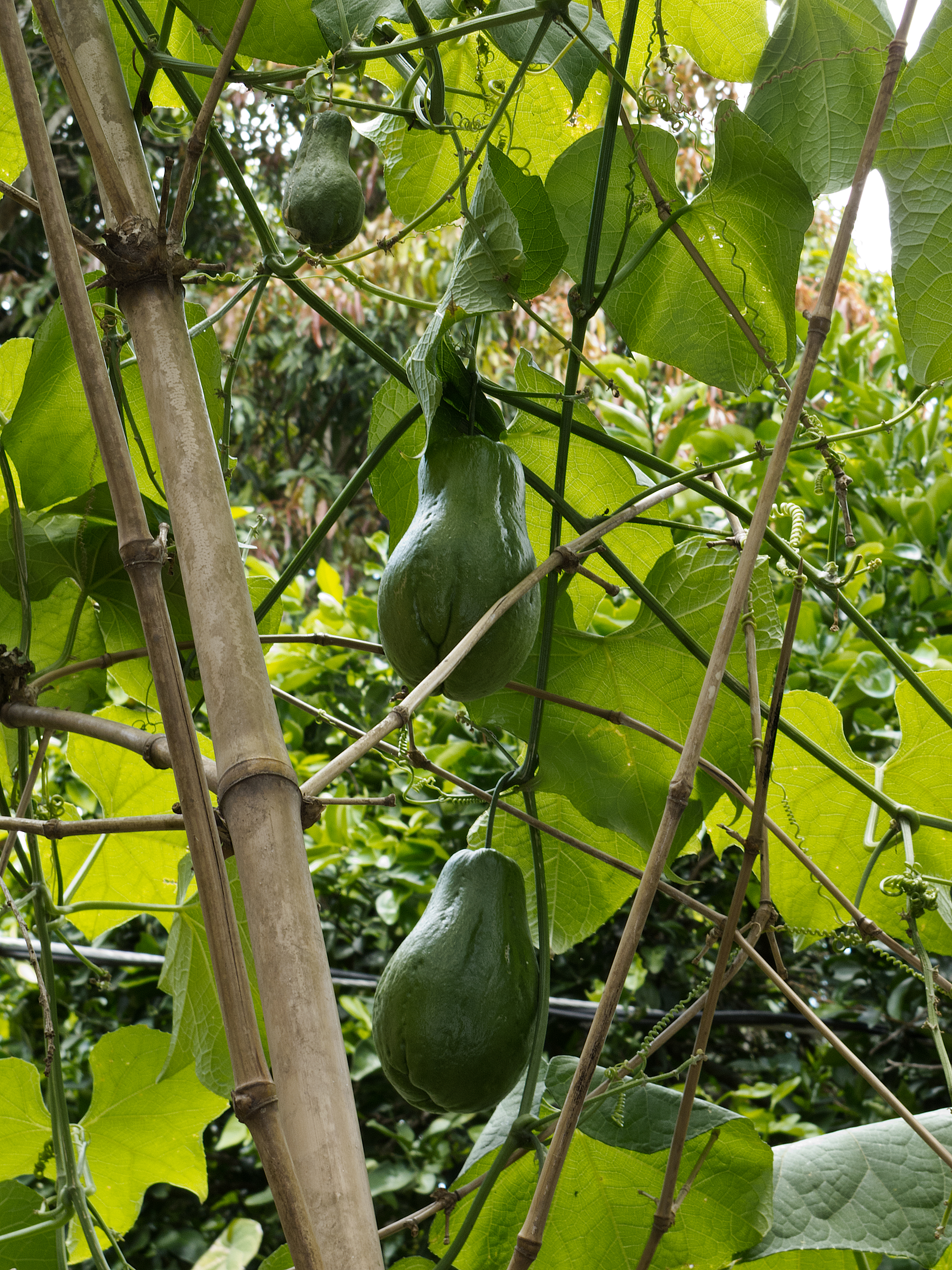
Chayote growing on vines (Central America)

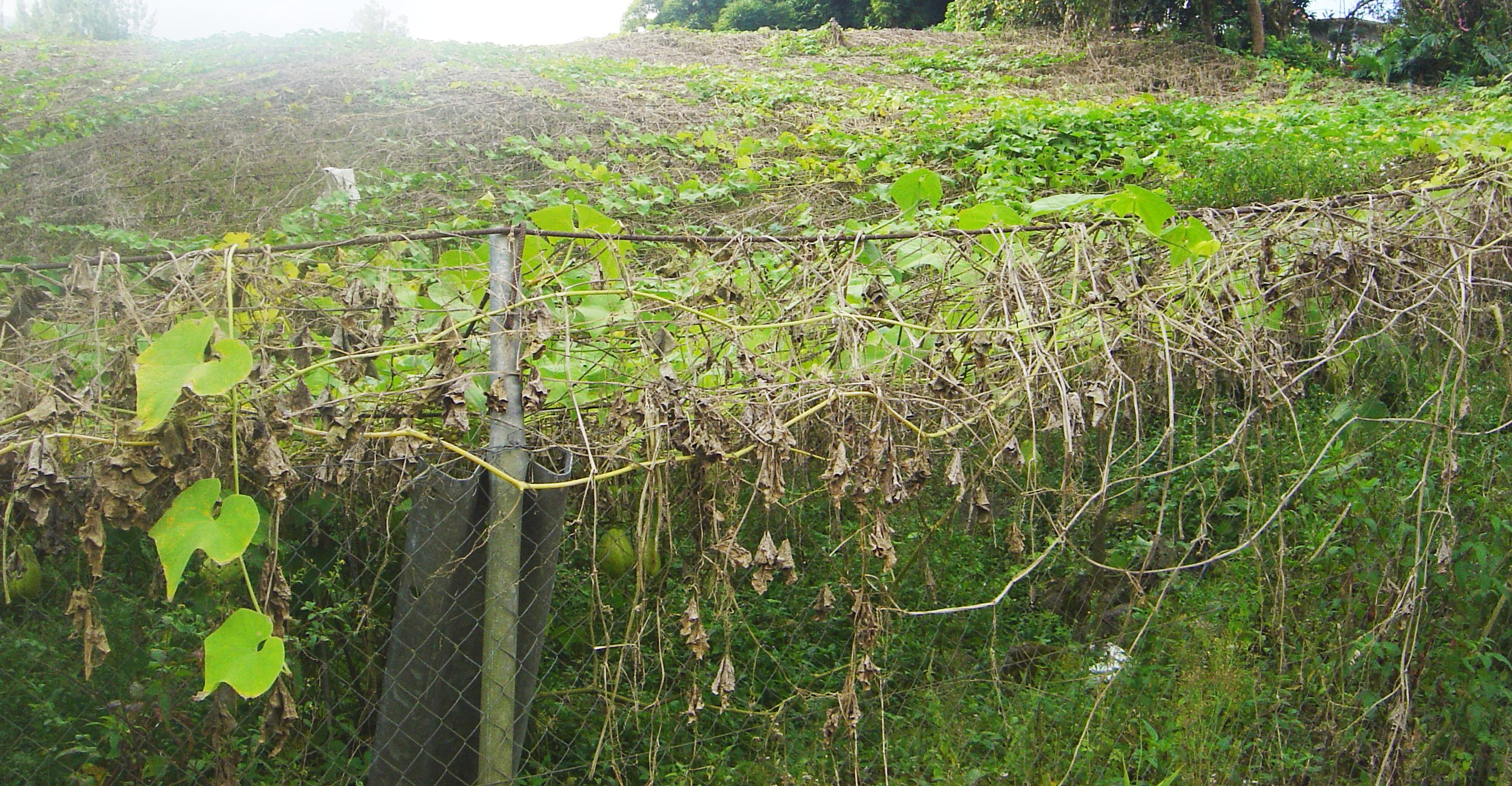
Chayote plantation (Réunion Island)

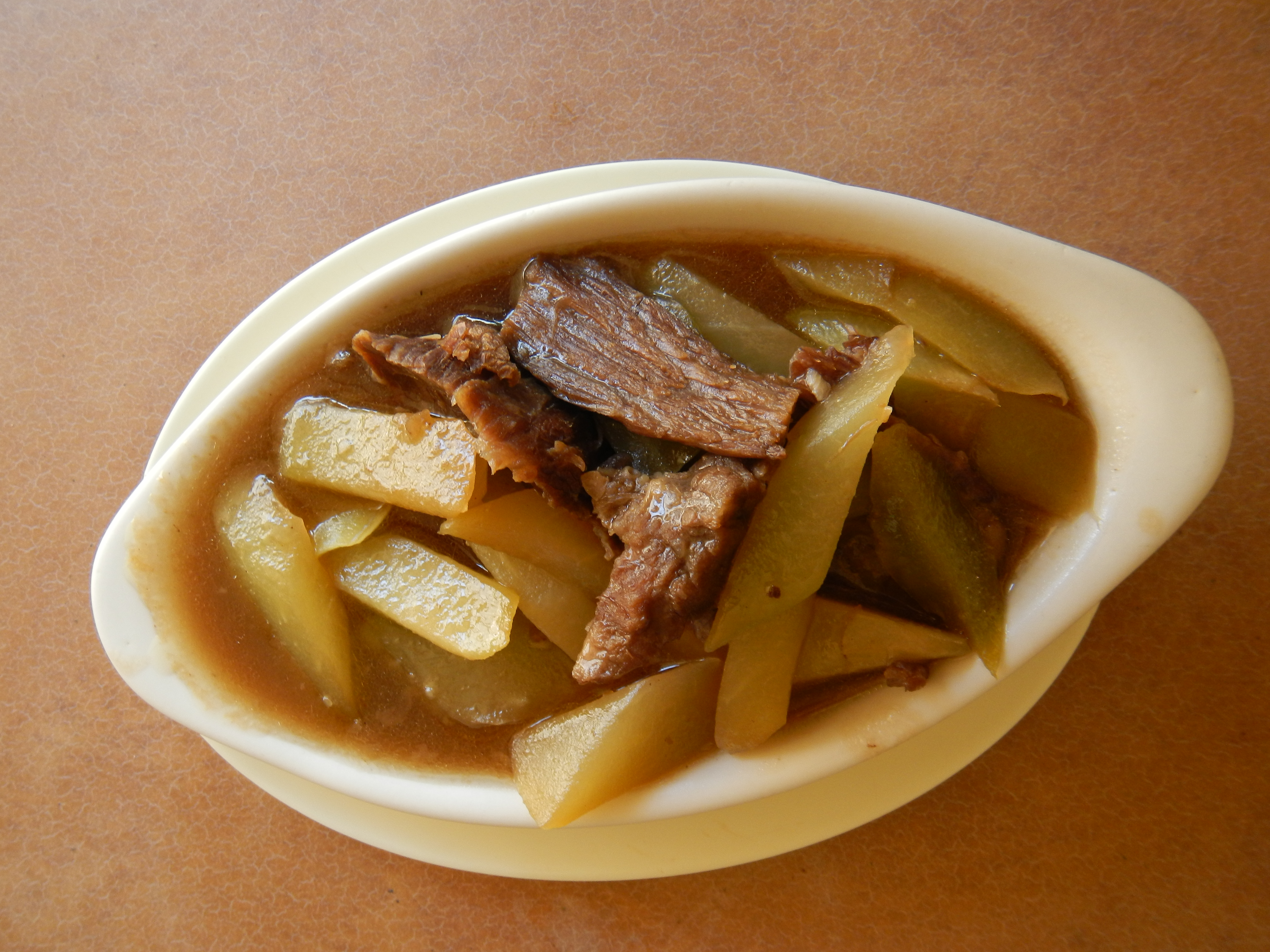
Chayote with beef (Philippines).

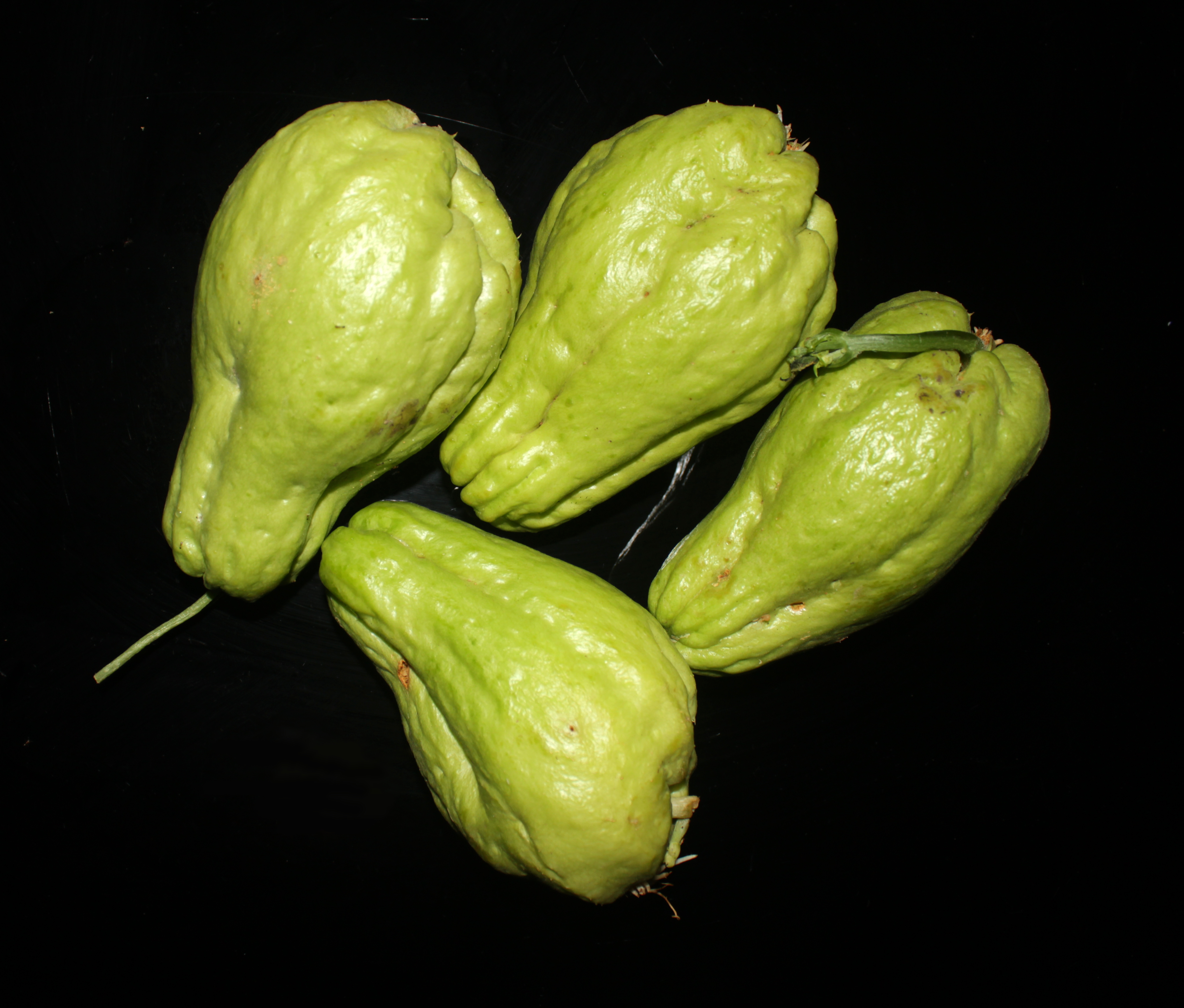
Chayote as harvested (Kattappana, India)

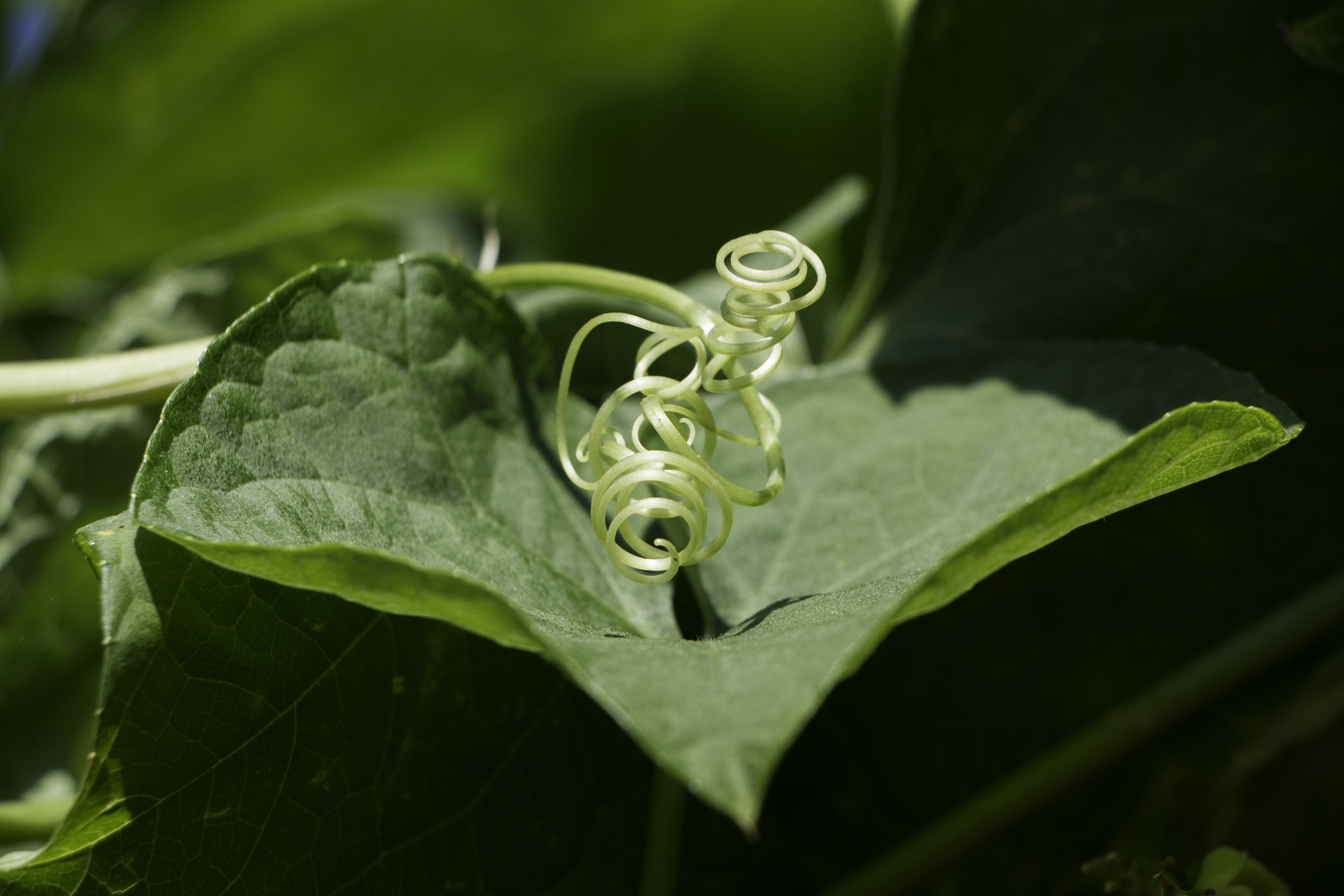
Leaf and tendril of chayote (Nepal)

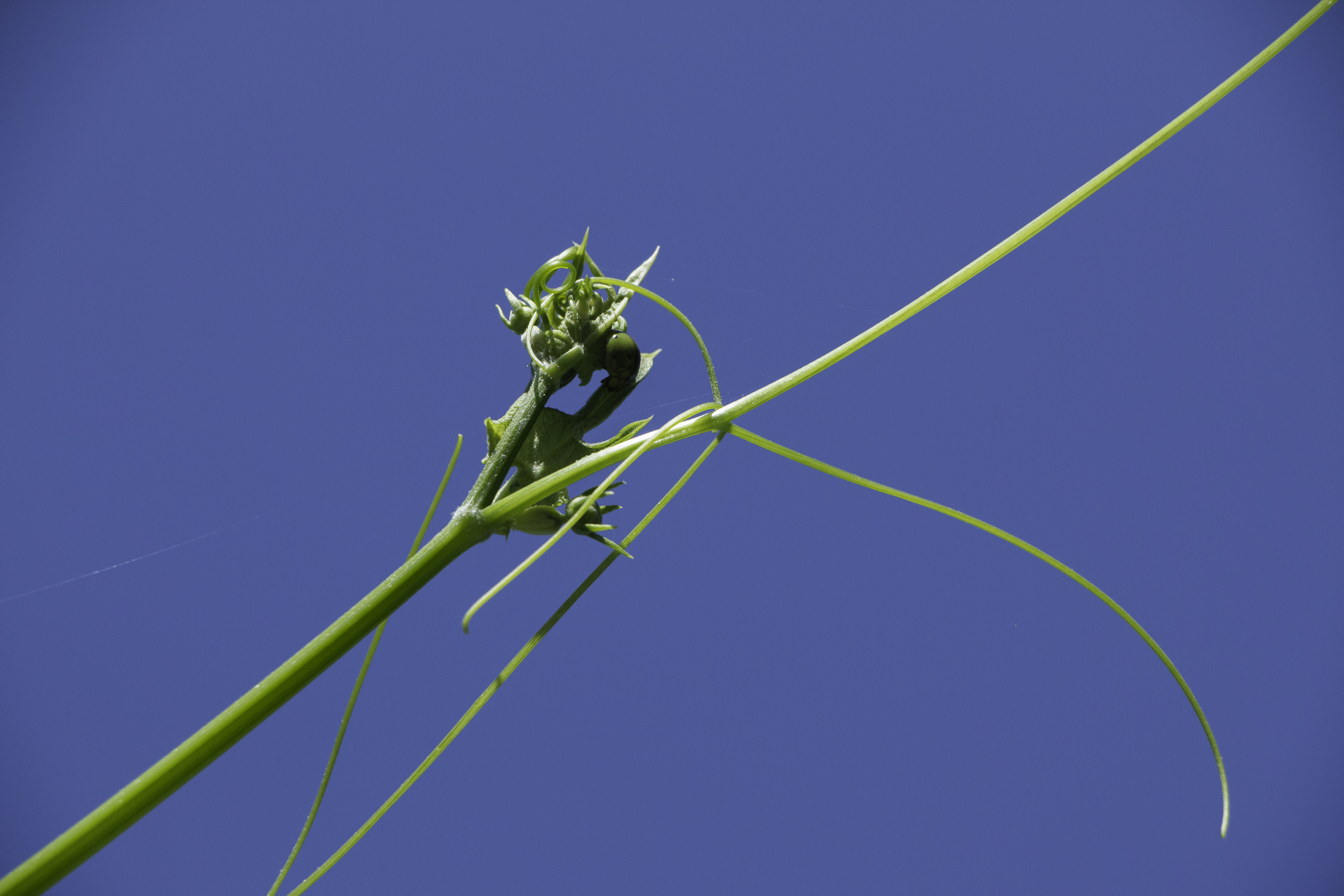
Shoot tip with tendrils of chayote (Nepal)

== See also ==
- Araujia sericifera, a toxic weed that is often described as "choko-like".
- List of vegetables

== Sources ==
- Rafael Lira Saade. 1996. Chayote Sechium edule (Jacq.) Sw. Promoting the conservation and use of underutilized and neglected crops. 8. Institute of Plant Genetics and Crop Plant Research, Gatersleben/International Plant Genetic Resources Institute, Rome, Italy. ISBN 92-9043-298-5 available in pdf format
