= Sicyos albus =

Scientific classification
- Kingdom: Plantae
- Clade: Tracheophytes
- Clade: Angiosperms
- Clade: Eudicots
- Clade: Rosids
- Order: Cucurbitales
- Family: Cucurbitaceae
- Genus: Sicyos
- Species: S. albus

Binomial name
- Sicyos albus (H.St.John) Telford

Species of flowering plant

Sicyos albus (sometimes spelled Sicyos alba) is a species of flowering plant in the gourd family known by the common names anunu and white bur-cucumber. It is endemic to Hawaii, where it is known only from the island of Hawaii. It is threatened by the destruction and degradation of its habitat. It is a federally listed endangered species of the United States.

This plant is a vine which can grow up to 20 meters in length. The stem is black-spotted and the flowers and fruit are white. The plant grows on wet forested slopes.

The plant is threatened by damage to its habitat caused by feral pigs and introduced species of plants.
