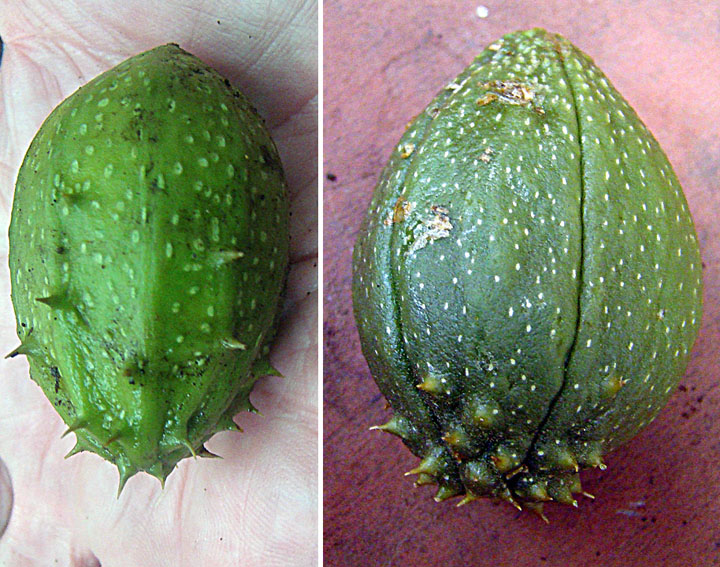
- Sechium tacaco

Scientific classification
- Kingdom: Plantae
- Clade: Tracheophytes
- Clade: Angiosperms
- Clade: Eudicots
- Clade: Rosids
- Order: Cucurbitales
- Family: Cucurbitaceae
- Subfamily: Cucurbitoideae
- Tribe: Sicyoeae
- Genus: Sechium; P.Browne

= Sechium =

Genus of plants

Sechium was a genus of plants now subsumed into the genus Sicyos: also placed in the tribe Sicyoeae of the gourd family, Cucurbitaceae. Its best known member was the edible and widely cultivated chayote (now Sicyos edulis).

== Species ==
Several species formerly placed in genus Sechium have now been placed in other genera. Several other species names are unplaced – "names that cannot be accepted, nor can they be put into synonymy".

=== Formerly placed here ===
- Cayaponia amazonica (Poepp. & Endl.) Cogn. (as Sechium amazonicum Poepp. & Endl.)
- Cayaponia peruviana (Poepp. & Endl.) Cogn. (as Sechium peruvianum Poepp. & Endl.)
- Microsechium compositum Donn.Sm. (as Sechium compositum (Donn.Sm.) C.Jeffrey)
- Microsechium hintonii Paul G.Wilson (as Sechium hintonii (Paul G.Wilson) C.Jeffrey)
- Microsechium palmatum (Ser.) Cogn. (as Sechium palmatum Ser.)
- Sicyos edulis (as Sechium edule (Jacq.) Sw. or Sechium americanum Poir.) – chayote or christophene

=== Unplaced species names ===
- Sechium chinantlense Lira & F. Chiang
- Sechium mexicanum Lira & M.Nee
- Sechium panamense (Wunderlin) Lira & F.Chiang
- Sechium pittieri (Cogn.) C.Jeffrey
- Sechium tacaco (Pittier) C.Jeffrey
- Sechium talamancensis (Wunderlin) C.Jeffrey
- Sechium venosum (L.D.Gómez) Lira & F.Chiang
- Sechium villosum (Wunderlin) C.Jeffrey
