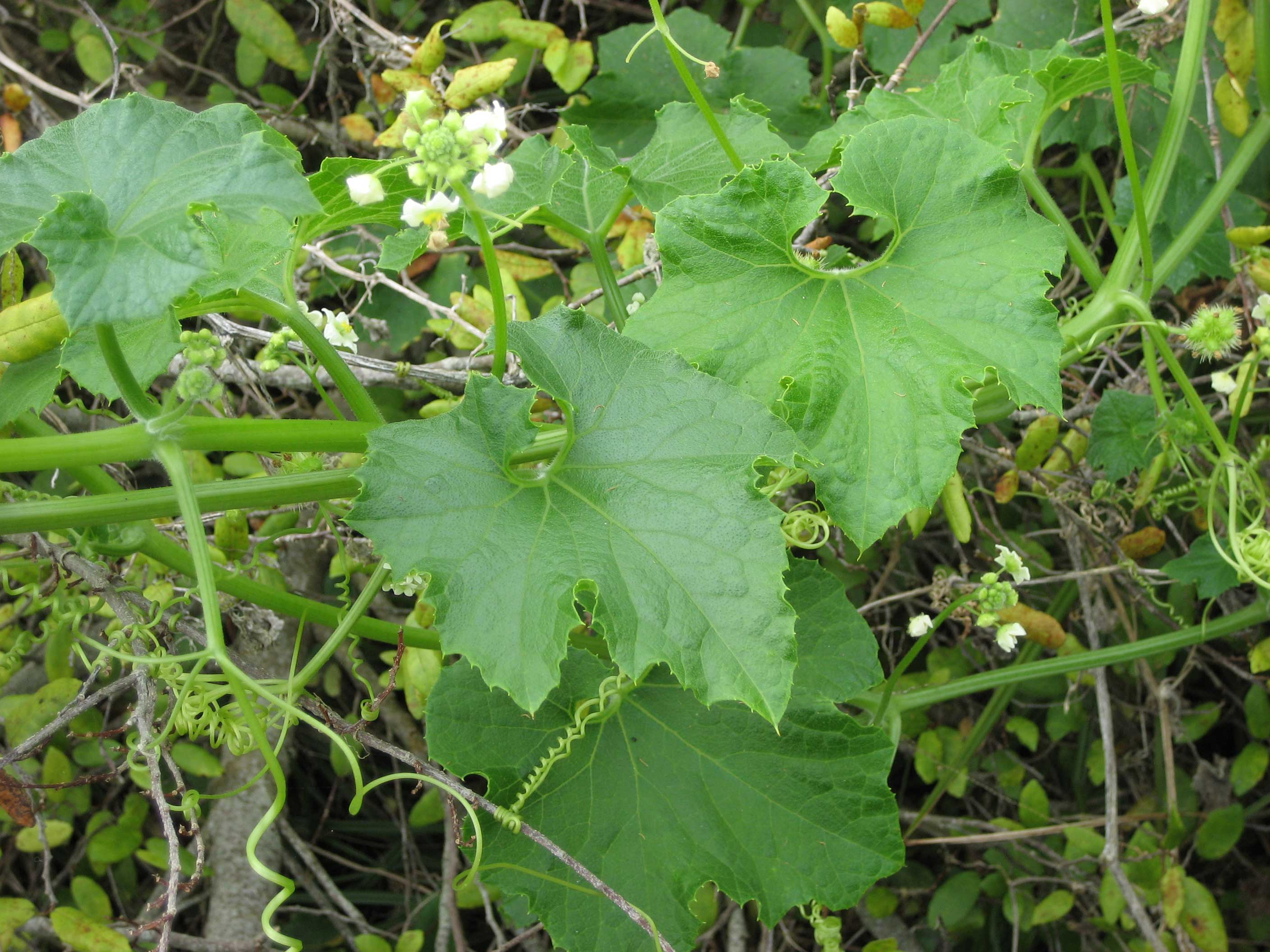
- Sicyos australis, New Zealand

Scientific classification
- Kingdom: Plantae
- Clade: Tracheophytes
- Clade: Angiosperms
- Clade: Eudicots
- Clade: Rosids
- Order: Cucurbitales
- Family: Cucurbitaceae
- Subfamily: Cucurbitoideae
- Tribe: Sicyoeae
- Genus: Sicyos; L.

Species
- See text

Synonyms
- Ahzolia Standl. & Steyerm.; Anomalosicyos Gentry; Baderoa Bertol. ex Hook.; Bryoniastrum Heist. ex Fabr.; Chayota Jacq.; Chocho Adans.; Cladocarpa (H.St.John) H.St.John; Costarica L.D.Gómez; Frantzia Pittier; Micrampelis Raf.; Polakowskia Pittier; Sarx H.St.John; Sechium P.Browne; Sicyocarya (A.Gray) H.St.John; Sicyoides Mill.; Sicyus Clem., orth. var.; Skottsbergiliana H.St.John; Sycios Medik., orth. var.

= Sicyos =

Genus of flowering plants

Sicyos is a flowering plant genus of the family Cucurbitaceae. Members of the genus may be known as burr cucumbers, but the genus includes Sicyos edulis which is the christophine or chayote.

== Species ==
Plants of the World Online includes:

1. Sicyos acariaeanthus Harms
2. Sicyos acerifolius Brandegee
3. Sicyos albus (H.St.John) I.Telford
4. Sicyos andreanus Cogn.
5. Sicyos angulatus L.
6. Sicyos anunu (H.St.John) I.Telford
7. Sicyos australis Endl.
8. Sicyos baderoa Hook. & Arn.
9. Sicyos barbatus (Gentry) C.Jeffrey
10. Sicyos bogotensis Cogn.
11. Sicyos brandegeeana R.Kr.Singh
12. Sicyos bulbosus Rodr.-Arév., Lira & Dávila
13. Sicyos chaetocephalus Harms
14. Sicyos chinantlensis (Lira & F.Chiang) R.Kr.Singh
15. Sicyos chiriquensis Hammel & D'Arcy
16. Sicyos collinus B.L.Rob. & Fernald
17. Sicyos compositus (Donn.Sm.) R.Kr.Singh
18. Sicyos cordifolius Rodr.-Arév., Lira & Dávila
19. Sicyos cucumerinus A.Gray
20. Sicyos davilae Rodr.-Arév. & Lira
21. Sicyos debilis Cogn.
22. Sicyos dieterleae Rodr.-Arév. & Lira
23. Sicyos dipterus (Kearns) R.Kr.Singh
24. Sicyos distinctus (Kearns) R.Kr.Singh
25. Sicyos edulis Jacq.
26. Sicyos erostratus H.St.John
27. Sicyos fusiformis Cogn.
28. Sicyos galeottii Cogn.
29. Sicyos glaber Wooton
30. Sicyos gonzalo-palomae (Lira) R.Kr.Singh
31. Sicyos gracilis (A.Gray) R.Kr.Singh
32. Sicyos gracillimus Cogn.
33. Sicyos guatemalensis Standl. & Steyerm.
34. Sicyos herbstii (H.St.John) I.Telford
35. Sicyos hillebrandii H.St.John
36. Sicyos hintonii (Paul G.Wilson) R.Kr.Singh
37. Sicyos hispidus Hillebr.
38. Sicyos ignarus Mart.Crov.
39. Sicyos kunthii Cogn.
40. Sicyos kuntzei Cogn.
41. Sicyos laciniatus L.
42. Sicyos laevis A.Gray
43. Sicyos lanceoloideus (H.St.John) W.L.Wagner & D.R.Herbst
44. Sicyos lasiocephalus Skottsb.
45. Sicyos lirae Rodr.-Arév.
46. Sicyos longisepalus Cogn.
47. Sicyos longisetosus Cogn.
48. Sicyos macrocarpus Cogn.
49. Sicyos macrophyllus A.Gray
50. Sicyos maculatus (Dieterle) R.Kr.Singh
51. Sicyos malvifolius Griseb.
52. Sicyos martii Cogn.
53. Sicyos mawhai I.Telford & P.Sebastian
54. Sicyos maximowiczii Cogn.
55. Sicyos mcvaughii Rodr.-Arév., Lira & Calzada
56. Sicyos mexicanus (Lira & M.Nee) R.Kr.Singh
57. Sicyos microphyllus Kunth
58. Sicyos montanus Poepp. & Endl.
59. Sicyos odonellii Mart.Crov.
60. Sicyos pachycarpus Hook. & Arn.
61. Sicyos palmatilobus Cogn.
62. Sicyos palmatus (Ser.) Cogn.
63. Sicyos parviflorus Willd.
64. Sicyos peninsularis Brandegee
65. Sicyos pentagonus (Wiggins) R.Kr.Singh
66. Sicyos polyacanthos Cogn.
67. Sicyos sangeetae R.Kr.Singh
68. Sicyos semitonsus H.St.John
69. Sicyos sertulifer Cogn.
70. Sicyos sinaloae Brandegee
71. Sicyos tetrapterus (Dieterle) R.Kr.Singh
72. Sicyos triquetrus Moc. & Sessé ex Ser.
73. Sicyos undara I.Telford & P.Sebastian
74. Sicyos urolobus Harms
75. Sicyos vargasii Standl. & F.A.Barkley
76. Sicyos villosus Hook.f.
77. Sicyos waimanaloensis H.St.John
78. Sicyos warmingii Cogn.
79. Sicyos weberbaueri Harms

=== Formerly placed here ===
- Blastania garcini (Burm.f.) Cogn. (as S. garcini Burm.f.)
- Cissus trifoliata (L.) L. (as S. trifoliatus L.)
- Echinocystis lobata (Michx.) Torr. & A.Gray (as S. lobatus Michx.)
- Marah oregana (Torr. & A.Gray) Howell (as S. oreganus Torr. & A.Gray)
