= Sicyos cucumerinus =

Scientific classification
- Kingdom: Plantae
- Clade: Tracheophytes
- Clade: Angiosperms
- Clade: Eudicots
- Clade: Rosids
- Order: Cucurbitales
- Family: Cucurbitaceae
- Genus: Sicyos
- Species: S. cucumerinus

Binomial name
- Sicyos cucumerinus A.Gray

Species of flowering plant

Sicyos cucumerinus, commonly known as Gray's burr cucumber or one-seeded bur cucumber, is a species of flowering plant in the family Cucurbitaceae. It is native to Hawaii.
