= Sicyos triquetrus =

- Sicyos triquetrus climbing ornamental shrub

Scientific classification
- Kingdom: Plantae
- Clade: Tracheophytes
- Clade: Angiosperms
- Clade: Eudicots
- Clade: Rosids
- Order: Cucurbitales
- Family: Cucurbitaceae
- Genus: Sicyos
- Species: S. triquetrus

Binomial name
- Sicyos triquetrus Moc. & Sessé ex Ser.

Synonyms
- Sechiopsis triquetra (Moc. & Sessé ex Ser.) Naudin

Species of plant

Sicyos triquetrus, with no English name, though in its Spanish-speaking homeland it is known as chayotillo, is a species of herbaceous, creeping to climbing vine native to Mexico. It belongs to the family of squashes and gourds, the Cucurbitaceae.

== Description ==
Among the 95 or so genera of the squash and gourd family and a bewildering rainbow of species and horticultural forms in the family, a unique combination of features of Sicyos triquetrus makes it distinctive. Here are its key features:

- It is a non-woody, annual vine with branching, hairless stems. Shallow furrows and ridges extend along the stem's length. Tendrils with 4 or 5 branches arise singly along stems where leaves attach.
- Leaves with petioles up to 7 cm (3 in) long bear blades up to 13.5 cm (5 1/2 in) long and 15 cm (6 in) wide; these usually are shallowly to deeply 3-6 lobed, though rarely unlobed. Blade margins bear many tiny teeth. Both blade surfaces bear abundant, rough-feeling trichomes with swollen bases.
- Flowers are unisexual, with male and female flowers present on the same plant; the plants are monoecious. Male flowers are produced in raceme-type inflorescences, in clusters spaced at intervals along the rachises. The calyx forms a more-or-less bell-shaped hypanthium at the base of which form 10 bulging, bag-like nectaries. In the center of the greenish-yellow corolla the 5 stamens usually are fused into a column atop which the anthers form a spherical head. Six to twelve female flowers cluster atop a common peduncle, with the perianths similar to the male flowers', except that there are 3 or sometimes 4 sepals and petals, not five, and these are much reduced. Female flower calyxes do not develop nectar pouches.
- Fruits, unusual for a member of the Cucurbitaceae, are dry, do not split upon at maturity (samara type), and bear 2-4 conspicuous, thin wings which strongly adhere to the seed. The seed is more or less triangular-egg-shaped and angular, and with a hard seed coat.

== Distribution ==
Sicyos triquetrus is endemic just to Mexico. Within Mexico it is broadly distributed in the western and central highlands. It occurs in the states of Aguascalientes, Colima, Durango, Guanajuato, Guerrero, Jalisco, México, Michoacán, Morelia, Nayarit, Oaxaca, Puebla, Querétaro, San Luis Potosí, Sinaloa, Sonora and Zacatecas.

== Habitat ==
In central Mexico, Sicyos triquetrus inhabits tropical deciduous forests with long dry seasons, scrub in subtropical zones, and disturbed vegetation associated with those habitats, at 1,650 to 1,900 m (5,410 to 6,230 ft) in elevation above sea level. Elsewhere in Mexico it occurs in secondary forests, scrub, roadsides and plots of land at elevations as low as 450 m (1,480 ft).

== As a weed ==
In Mexico Sicyos triquetrus is a weed in sorghum, corn (maize), plantations of tequila agave and other crops. The species can form dense curtains over shrubs, crops, secondary vegetation and forest edges.

== Traditional uses ==
=== For making soap ===
The large, bitter roots of Sicyos triquetrus contain substantial quantities of saponin and have been used for making soap.

=== As livestock food ===
In Mexico's Guerrero state Sicyos triquetrus serves as livestock fodder.

== Taxonomy ==
In 1828, Sicyos triquetrus was formally and legitimately named and described by Nicolas Charles Seringe. Earlier the taxon had been named by José Mariano Mociño and Martín Sessé y Lacasta, but the new species was not validly published according to the rules of botanical nomenclature. Seringe acknowledged the work of Mociño and Sessé y Lacasta with this note in Latin shorthand: "Moc. et Sessé fl. mex. mss."

Until recently, Sicyos triquetrus was treated as Sechiopsis triquetra. In 2026, much literature and numerous websites continued to use the name Sechiopsis triquetra, though the genus Sechiopsis now is considered synonymous with Sicyos, and Sechiopsis species have been transferred to Sicyos.

=== Phylogeny ===
Molecular phylogenetic analysis using plastid DNA and nuclear DNA from 87 species in the tribe Sicyoeae suggests that Sicyos triquetrus is sister to Sicyos tetrapterus. Species formerly assigned to the genus Sechiopsis, including Sicyos triquetrus, were scattered among more numerous Sicyos species, making clear that Sechiopsis did not qualify as a monophyletic genus.

=== Etymology ===
The genus name Sicyos is from the Greek sikyos, meaning "cucumber or gourd".

The species name triquetrus is constructed of the Greek word-forming element tri, meaning 3, and the Latin -quetrus, meaning "pointed, cornered", thus "3-angled", referring to the fruits which usually are 3-pointed.

== Gallery ==
male flower with 10 nectar pouches

male flowers clustered on inflorescence rachis

male flower with stigmas forming spherical head

cluster of immature, 3-winged fruits

mature fruit wings with reticulating veins

angled seed with wings removed
