= Climate of West Bengal =

West Bengal has a varied climate, with tropical savannahs in the southern portions of the state, to humid subtropical areas in the north. Temperatures vary widely, and there are five distinct seasons. The area is vulnerable to heavy rainfall, monsoons, and cyclones. There are some mountains in the area which are generally cold all year round.

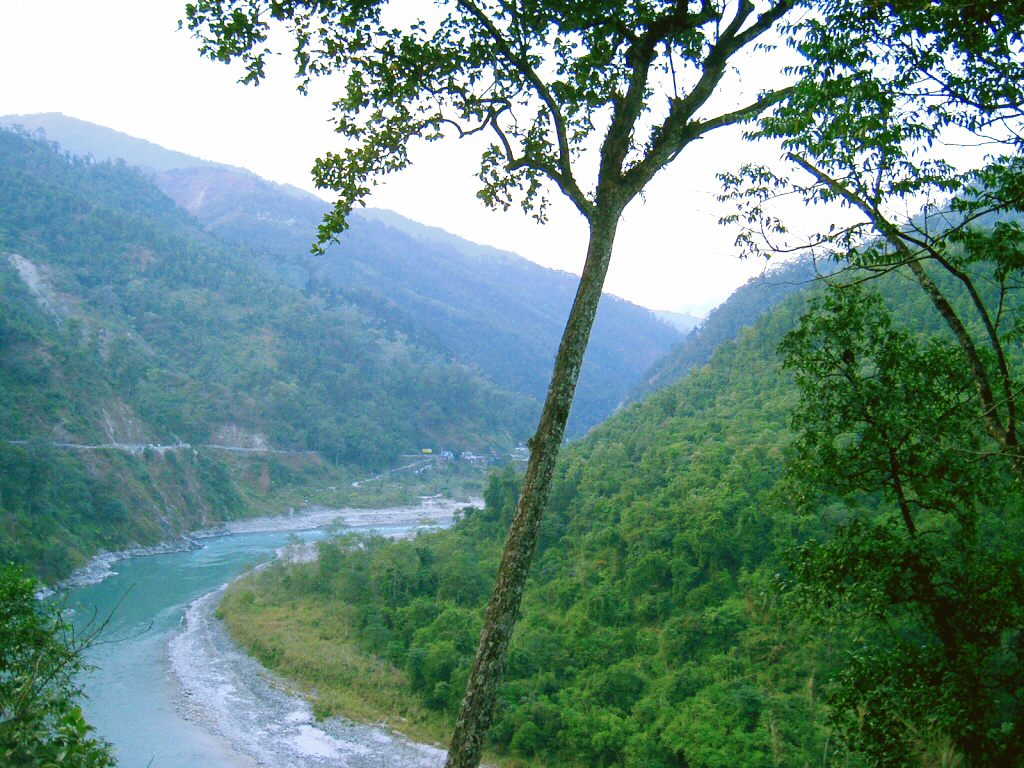
National Highway 31A winds along the banks of the Teesta River near Kalimpong, in the Darjeeling Himalayan hill region in West Bengal.

== Seasons ==
There are six main seasons in West Bengal: summer (Grishma), monsoons or rainy season (Barsha), autumn (Sharat), late autumn/pre winter (Hemanta), winter (Sheet), spring (Bawshonto) .

=== Spring ===
Spring is considered the most pleasant season over the plains of West Bengal and lies from mid-February to mid-March and is also the time where Holi is celebrated. Temperatures range between 20 °C – 30 °C and no rainfall. Though occasional rain or light showers are witnessed due to Western disturbances in North India.

=== Summer ===
The summer season is observed from March to May in most of Bengal.

==== Temperature ====
In Bengal, summers can be extremely hot and have high humidity. The plains of South Bengal have a daily maximum temperature around 35–38 °C. It can also exceed 40 °C. The western highlands experience a dry summer like northern India. During the day, the temperature ranges from 38 to 42 °C, though it can reach or exceed 45 °C. In summer, the plains of North Bengal are generally cooler than the west and south. In this area, the daily maximum temperature varies from 26 °C to 32 °C. It occasionally crosses 35 °C. The minimum temperature in summer is approximately 18–22 °C. The Darjeeling hill region is the coolest area in summer. Here, the daily highest temperature is 15–25 °C.

==== Rainfall ====
Average temperature and Rainfall for Bengali cities in summer (March to May)
City	Average temperature (°C)	Average Rainfall (mm)
Darjeeling	13.1	446
Siliguri	24.2	447
Jalpaiguri	24.0	453
Malda	28.3	188
Shantiniketan	29.4	264
Behrampore	29.3	136
Krishnagar	29.5	96
Asansol	30.0	114
Bankura	29.9	146
Kolkata	29.8	227
Digha	28.4	214
West Bengal	26.9	248.3

=== Monsoons ===
==== Period ====
In mid-June or early July, the monsoon season starts.

==== Temperature ====
In most places, the temperature drops as cloud cover increases. This is less true for the mountains and the Terai Dooars plains, where temperature gradually increases until August.

The maximum temperature of South Bengal's plains and western highlands is 32 °C, 31 °C in North Bengal plains and around 19–20 °C in mountains. Sometimes when the sky gets clear, the temperature rises suddenly. This is known as a monsoon break. This occurs mostly in North Bengal plains and in mountains in July and August when the temperature soars over 36 °C and 24 °C respectively.

==== Rainfall ====
Most of the annual rainfall occurs during the monsoon period. Heavy rainfall above 250 cm is observed in the Darjeeling, Jalpaiguri, Alipurduar and Cooch Behar district. Later, blowing westwards, the winds cause average rainfall of 125 cm in the northern plains and western plateau region.

Average temperature and Rainfall for Bengali cities during monsoon season (June to September)
City	Average temperature (°C)	Average Rainfall (mm)
Darjeeling	16.4	2796
Siliguri	28.1	2651
Jalpaiguri	28.0	2674
Malda	29.6	1207
Shantiniketan	29.4	1510
Behrampore	30.2	1036
Krishnagar	29.4	1348
Asansol	29.5	1140
Bankura	30.3	1227
Kolkata	29.6	1358
Digha	29.1	1192
West Bengal	28.1	1649.0

=== Autumn ===
==== Period ====
Autumn lasts for two months, October and November.

==== Temperature ====
In autumn, the southwest monsoon wind returns and clears the sky. So, the state gets enough sunshine to be warm in the day and releases a lot of heat to be cool at night.

At this time, a maximum temperature of 30–33 °C is felt over the plains and 17–19 °C in mountains. The minimum temperature is normally around 19–22 °C in plains and 6–11 °C in mountains. Sometimes, cold waves blow over the state in autumn.

==== Rainfall ====
In autumn, the southwest monsoon wind returns, and the northeast monsoon wind enters West Bengal. Due to their collision in Bay of Bengal, some cyclones are created. The cyclones cause some rainfall in the state.

Average temperature and Rainfall for Bengali cities in autumn (October and November)
City	Average temperature (°C)	Average Rainfall (mm)
Darjeeling	13.4	74
Siliguri	23.2	181
Jalpaiguri	23.6	169
Malda	26.2	132
Shantiniketan	25.3	212
Behrampore	26.2	146
Krishnagar	26.5	175
Asansol	24.8	125
Bankura	25.9	94
Kolkata	26.6	216
Digha	25.9	240
West Bengal	24.3	160.4

=== Winter ===
==== Period ====
The winter season usually starts in December and ends in February.

==== Temperature ====
In winter, a mild temperature is observed over the plains. The maximum temperature goes to 23–26 °C and the minimum temperature is 9–15 °C in plains of the state. The maximum and minimum temperature in the mountains range from 0–12 °C. Higher regions of the Darjeeling Himalayas get heavy snowfall during winter.

The temperatures of the western highlands at night can drop 7–9 °C, 4–7 °C in Siliguri, Jalpaiguri, Coochbehar plains and 10–11 °C in Kolkata when cold waves blow. Darjeeling's temperature can drop below freezing point.

==== Rainfall ====
Winter is generally dry. Most days are sunny. Occasionally, slight rainfall occurs because of conditions in northwest India. These are known as western disturbances.

Average temperature and Rainfall for some cities in Winter (December to February)
City	Average temperature (°C)	Average Rainfall (mm)
Darjeeling	7.6	30
Siliguri	17.3	60
Jalpaiguri	18.9	36
Malda	20.6	27
Shantiniketan	19.7	44
Behrampore	20.6	32
Krishnagar	20.5	29
Asansol	19.7	46
Bankura	20.1	42
Kolkata	21.6	35
Digha	21.1	43
West Bengal	17.0	38.5

== Extreme temperatures ==
Sources: India Meteorological Department

=== Record high temperatures ===
The chart below shows the highest recorded temperatures in individual stations, for all months in West Bengal, with place and date.

Month	Highest Recorded Temperature (°C)	Place	Date
January	36.8	Krishnanagar	1 January 1977
February	39.3	Bankura	26 February 2006
March	44.5	Behrampore	27 March 1980
April	47.2	Kalaikunda	30 April 2024
May	48.3	Behrampore	23 May 1981
June	47.8	Suri	10 June 1966
July	43.0	Krishnanagar	22 July 1994
August	43.0	Krishnanagar	3 August 1994
September	41.0	Coochbehar	11 September 1977
October	40.5	Malda	1 October 1978
November	38.5	Bagati	6 November 1976
December	36.5	Bagati	30 December 1984
West Bengal	48.3	Behrampore	23 May 1981

=== Record low temperatures ===
The chart below shows the lowest recorded temperatures in individual stations, for all months in West Bengal, with place and date.

Month	Lowest Recorded Temperature (°C)	Place	Date
January	-7.2	Darjeeling	30 January 1971
February	-6.4	Darjeeling	2 February 1971
March	-4.8	Darjeeling	1 March 1971
April	0.0	Darjeeling	16 April 1971
May	1.4	Darjeeling	1 May 1981
June	4.6	Kalimpong	14 June 1991
July	3.9	Darjeeling	26 July 1944
August	7.4	Kalimpong	24 August 1971
September	5.9	Kalimpong	10 September 1991
October	3.2	Darjeeling	31 October 1972
November	-4.4	Darjeeling	26 November 1970
December	-4.6	Darjeeling	29 December 1970
West Bengal	-7.2	Darjeeling	30 January 1971

=== Record low temperature in the plains ===
The chart below shows the lowest recorded temperatures in individual stations in the plains, for all months in West Bengal, with place and date.

Month	Lowest Recorded Temperature (°C)	Place	Date
January	0.9	Krishnanagar	2 January 1986
February	2.2	Jalpaiguri	5 February 1914
March	6.2	Siliguri	4 March 1965
April	8.1	Coochbehar	9 April 2014
May	11.5	Jalpaiguri	10 May 1987
June	13.8	Contai	12 June 1961
July	12.0	Krishnanagar	16 July 1995
August	12.4	Sandheads	7 August 1972
September	10.4	Sandheads	2 September 1976
October	10.0	Sandheads	1995
November	6.4	Siliguri	30 November 1971
December	2.4	Siliguri	26 December 1961
West Bengal	0.9	Krishnanagar	2 January 1986

== Extreme Rainfall ==
The chart below shows the maximum recorded rainfall in individual stations (observatories) in the state, for all months, with place and date.

Month	Highest Recorded 24 hrs Rainfall (mm)	Place	Date
January	134.6	Darjeeling	10 January 1967
February	161.0	Balurghat	19 February 1989
March	243.2	Sandheads	4 March 1990
April	210.0	Bardhaman	3 April 1994
May	615.0	Sandheads	17 May 1995
June	507.5	Sandheads	21 June 1981
July	884.5	Sagar Islands	22 July 1991
August	490.0	Sandheads	22 August 1991
September	593.6	Sandheads	25 September 1986
October	419.2	Kalimpong	5 October 1968
November	322.0	Sandheads	10 November 1990
December	251.3	Diamond Harbour	11 December 1981
West Bengal	884.5	Sagar Islands	22 July 1991

== Rainfall ==
Annual rainfall varies in different parts of the state. North Bengal receives the highest rainfall, 200 to 400 cm. In the coastal areas rainfall is about 200 cm, in the Ganga plain and in the central part of the state rainfall is about 150–200 cm, and in the western plateau region the amount of rainfall received is about 100 to 125 cm. Drought is a common phenomenon in the Bankura and Purulia districts. Rainfall that occurs in the summer months often brings about heavy storms called Kalbaishakhi.

== Cyclones in West Bengal ==
Name	Lowest Pressure (mbar)	Year	Winds (in km/h)	Image
1970 Bhola Cyclone	966	1970		
BOB 03	964	1981		
BOB 07	994	1997		
BOB 06	984	1998		
BOB 04	998	2000		
BOB 03	970	2002	100	
Sidr	944	2007	215	
Rashmi	996	2008	85	
Aila	970	2009	120	
Komen	986	2015	75	
Roanu	983	2016	85	
Mora	978	2017	110	
Amphan	925	2020	240	

== Mountainous region ==
Because of the high altitude, mountainous parts of Darjeeling and Jalpaiguri experience a cool temperate and climate. The average temperature in summer is about 15 °C (59 °F), and winter temperature is about 2 °C (36 °F). Snowfall occurs in some parts of this region. Being obstructed by the Himalayas, the region receives heavy rainfall. Due to the scenic beauty and temperate climate of the region, a huge number of tourists visit the areas. Here Kalimpong is another hill station that is visited by many tourists in all seasons for its scenic beauty and the average cool temperature throughout the year.

== Climate data ==
Climate data for Kolkata (Alipore) 1991–2020, extremes 1901–present
Month	Jan	Feb	Mar	Apr	May	Jun	Jul	Aug	Sep	Oct	Nov	Dec	Year
Record high °C (°F)	32.8 (91.0)	38.4 (101.1)	41.1 (106.0)	43.3 (109.9)	43.7 (110.7)	43.9 (111.0)	39.9 (103.8)	38.4 (101.1)	38.9 (102.0)	39.0 (102.2)	34.9 (94.8)	32.5 (90.5)	43.9 (111.0)
Mean maximum °C (°F)	29.8 (85.6)	33.9 (93.0)	37.5 (99.5)	38.8 (101.8)	39.0 (102.2)	37.8 (100.0)	36.0 (96.8)	35.3 (95.5)	35.5 (95.9)	35.3 (95.5)	33.1 (91.6)	30.0 (86.0)	39.8 (103.6)
Mean daily maximum °C (°F)	25.5 (77.9)	29.4 (84.9)	33.7 (92.7)	35.4 (95.7)	35.5 (95.9)	34.1 (93.4)	32.5 (90.5)	32.3 (90.1)	32.6 (90.7)	32.3 (90.1)	30.2 (86.4)	26.7 (80.1)	31.7 (89.1)
Daily mean °C (°F)	19.9 (67.8)	23.8 (74.8)	28.2 (82.8)	30.6 (87.1)	31.2 (88.2)	30.6 (87.1)	29.5 (85.1)	29.4 (84.9)	29.4 (84.9)	28.3 (82.9)	25.1 (77.2)	21.1 (70.0)	27.3 (81.1)
Mean daily minimum °C (°F)	14.3 (57.7)	18.1 (64.6)	22.9 (73.2)	25.7 (78.3)	26.8 (80.2)	27.1 (80.8)	26.7 (80.1)	26.6 (79.9)	26.3 (79.3)	24.4 (75.9)	20.1 (68.2)	15.5 (59.9)	22.9 (73.2)
Mean minimum °C (°F)	10.9 (51.6)	12.4 (54.3)	18.2 (64.8)	21.1 (70.0)	21.8 (71.2)	23.9 (75.0)	24.3 (75.7)	24.6 (76.3)	23.9 (75.0)	20.9 (69.6)	16.9 (62.4)	11.9 (53.4)	10.0 (50.0)
Record low °C (°F)	6.7 (44.1)	7.2 (45.0)	10.0 (50.0)	16.1 (61.0)	17.9 (64.2)	20.4 (68.7)	20.6 (69.1)	22.6 (72.7)	20.6 (69.1)	17.2 (63.0)	10.6 (51.1)	7.2 (45.0)	6.7 (44.1)
Average rainfall mm (inches)	15.4 (0.61)	24.6 (0.97)	36.8 (1.45)	55.0 (2.17)	118.5 (4.67)	276.7 (10.89)	371.6 (14.63)	372.1 (14.65)	325.0 (12.80)	179.6 (7.07)	32.6 (1.28)	5.6 (0.22)	1,813.3 (71.39)
Average rainy days	1.1	1.5	2.1	3.2	6.2	12.6	17.5	16.8	13.6	7.4	1.4	0.7	84.2
Average relative humidity (%) (at 17:30 IST)	62	55	51	61	68	77	82	83	82	76	68	65	69
Mean monthly sunshine hours	213.9	211.9	229.4	240.0	232.5	135.0	105.4	117.8	126.0	201.5	216.0	204.6	2,234
Mean daily sunshine hours	6.9	7.5	7.4	8.0	7.5	4.5	3.4	3.8	4.2	6.5	7.2	6.6	6.1
Average ultraviolet index	7	9	11	12	12	12	12	12	11	9	7	6	10
Source 1: India Meteorological Department (sun 1971–2000) Weather Atlas
Source 2: Tokyo Climate Center (mean temperatures 1991–2020)

Climate data for Kolkata (Dumdum Airport) 1991–2020, extremes 1939–2020
Month	Jan	Feb	Mar	Apr	May	Jun	Jul	Aug	Sep	Oct	Nov	Dec	Year
Record high °C (°F)	32.5 (90.5)	37.3 (99.1)	40.6 (105.1)	42.8 (109.0)	43.1 (109.6)	43.7 (110.7)	39.2 (102.6)	37.7 (99.9)	37.5 (99.5)	36.8 (98.2)	36.0 (96.8)	33.0 (91.4)	43.7 (110.7)
Mean daily maximum °C (°F)	25.3 (77.5)	29.2 (84.6)	33.6 (92.5)	35.9 (96.6)	36.1 (97.0)	34.8 (94.6)	33.2 (91.8)	33.0 (91.4)	33.3 (91.9)	32.5 (90.5)	30.1 (86.2)	26.6 (79.9)	32.0 (89.6)
Daily mean °C (°F)	18.8 (65.8)	22.9 (73.2)	27.4 (81.3)	30.1 (86.2)	30.6 (87.1)	30.3 (86.5)	29.5 (85.1)	29.3 (84.7)	29.3 (84.7)	27.9 (82.2)	24.3 (75.7)	20.1 (68.2)	26.7 (80.1)
Mean daily minimum °C (°F)	12.9 (55.2)	16.9 (62.4)	21.9 (71.4)	25.2 (77.4)	26.2 (79.2)	26.8 (80.2)	26.6 (79.9)	26.5 (79.7)	26.2 (79.2)	24.1 (75.4)	19.3 (66.7)	14.3 (57.7)	22.2 (72.0)
Record low °C (°F)	5.0 (41.0)	6.1 (43.0)	12.1 (53.8)	16.6 (61.9)	17.6 (63.7)	19.2 (66.6)	20.1 (68.2)	21.1 (70.0)	21.7 (71.1)	15.7 (60.3)	11.7 (53.1)	6.1 (43.0)	5.0 (41.0)
Average rainfall mm (inches)	15.8 (0.62)	20.2 (0.80)	31.9 (1.26)	53.4 (2.10)	140.5 (5.53)	247.5 (9.74)	366.5 (14.43)	355.4 (13.99)	282.1 (11.11)	170.2 (6.70)	21.3 (0.84)	6.8 (0.27)	1,711.5 (67.38)
Average rainy days	1.1	1.4	2.3	3.5	6.6	12.4	17.6	17.1	13.0	7.1	1.1	0.7	83.8
Average relative humidity (%) (at 08:30 IST)	61	53	49	58	66	76	81	82	81	75	67	66	68
Source 1: India Meteorological Department
Source 2: Tokyo Climate Center (mean temperatures 1991–2020)

Climate data for Siliguri (Bagdogra Airport), (1991-2020), extremes 1951–present
Month	Jan	Feb	Mar	Apr	May	Jun	Jul	Aug	Sep	Oct	Nov	Dec	Year
Record high °C (°F)	32.5 (90.5)	33.2 (91.8)	38.1 (100.6)	41.7 (107.1)	40.8 (105.4)	41.9 (107.4)	40.4 (104.7)	40.0 (104.0)	40.1 (104.2)	36.6 (97.9)	33.8 (92.8)	32.6 (90.7)	41.9 (107.4)
Mean maximum °C (°F)	25.6 (78.1)	27.9 (82.2)	32.8 (91.0)	34.9 (94.8)	35.3 (95.5)	36.3 (97.3)	36.0 (96.8)	36.7 (98.1)	35.8 (96.4)	33.5 (92.3)	30.4 (86.7)	27.2 (81.0)	37.0 (98.6)
Mean daily maximum °C (°F)	22.0 (71.6)	24.5 (76.1)	29.3 (84.7)	30.8 (87.4)	29.9 (85.8)	29.5 (85.1)	29.1 (84.4)	29.6 (85.3)	29.2 (84.6)	28.5 (83.3)	26.3 (79.3)	23.4 (74.1)	27.7 (81.8)
Mean daily minimum °C (°F)	10.7 (51.3)	12.8 (55.0)	16.1 (61.0)	19.5 (67.1)	22.1 (71.8)	24.0 (75.2)	24.6 (76.3)	24.6 (76.3)	23.5 (74.3)	19.7 (67.5)	15.2 (59.4)	11.8 (53.2)	18.7 (65.7)
Mean minimum °C (°F)	6.9 (44.4)	7.2 (45.0)	12.5 (54.5)	16.5 (61.7)	18.6 (65.5)	22.0 (71.6)	23.4 (74.1)	23.6 (74.5)	21.9 (71.4)	16.8 (62.2)	11.9 (53.4)	7.7 (45.9)	6.5 (43.7)
Record low °C (°F)	1.9 (35.4)	3.5 (38.3)	6.2 (43.2)	9.6 (49.3)	15.0 (59.0)	20.0 (68.0)	21.0 (69.8)	18.4 (65.1)	19.8 (67.6)	12.3 (54.1)	6.4 (43.5)	2.4 (36.3)	1.9 (35.4)
Average precipitation mm (inches)	23 (0.9)	24 (0.9)	34 (1.3)	76 (3.0)	249 (9.8)	628 (24.7)	843 (33.2)	589 (23.2)	403 (15.9)	121 (4.8)	10 (0.4)	11 (0.4)	3,011 (118.5)
Average rainy days	4	4	5	11	17	20	21	20	18	8	2	2	132
Average relative humidity (%)	69	65	54	63	79	88	90	88	87	80	70	68	75
Average ultraviolet index	5	7	9	11	12	13	14	13	11	8	5	4	9
Source 1: normal temperaturesUltraviolet Index
Source 2: Extremes(India Meteorological Department), Mean maximum and Mean minimum temperatures

Climate data for Darjeeling (1981–2010, extremes 1901–2012)
Month	Jan	Feb	Mar	Apr	May	Jun	Jul	Aug	Sep	Oct	Nov	Dec	Year
Record high °C (°F)	19.0 (66.2)	19.2 (66.6)	24.0 (75.2)	27.0 (80.6)	25.7 (78.3)	27.7 (81.9)	28.0 (82.4)	28.5 (83.3)	27.5 (81.5)	26.0 (78.8)	24.5 (76.1)	20.0 (68.0)	28.5 (83.3)
Mean daily maximum °C (°F)	10.7 (51.3)	12.4 (54.3)	15.6 (60.1)	18.5 (65.3)	19.3 (66.7)	19.8 (67.6)	19.6 (67.3)	20.0 (68.0)	19.8 (67.6)	19.5 (67.1)	17.1 (62.8)	14.0 (57.2)	17.2 (63.0)
Daily mean °C (°F)	6.1 (43.0)	7.7 (45.9)	10.6 (51.1)	13.7 (56.7)	14.9 (58.8)	16.3 (61.3)	16.5 (61.7)	16.7 (62.1)	16.1 (61.0)	15.0 (59.0)	11.7 (53.1)	8.9 (48.0)	12.9 (55.1)
Mean daily minimum °C (°F)	1.5 (34.7)	2.9 (37.2)	5.7 (42.3)	8.8 (47.8)	10.6 (51.1)	12.8 (55.0)	13.4 (56.1)	13.4 (56.1)	12.4 (54.3)	10.5 (50.9)	6.3 (43.3)	3.8 (38.8)	8.5 (47.3)
Record low °C (°F)	−7.2 (19.0)	−6.4 (20.5)	−4.8 (23.4)	0.0 (32.0)	1.4 (34.5)	6.6 (43.9)	3.9 (39.0)	8.0 (46.4)	6.2 (43.2)	3.2 (37.8)	−4.4 (24.1)	−4.6 (23.7)	−7.2 (19.0)
Average rainfall mm (inches)	13.5 (0.53)	14.0 (0.55)	30.8 (1.21)	76.9 (3.03)	137.9 (5.43)	466.0 (18.35)	656.7 (25.85)	528.2 (20.80)	379.7 (14.95)	59.1 (2.33)	14.4 (0.57)	2.9 (0.11)	2,380 (93.70)
Average rainy days	1.1	1.5	2.8	6.8	10.5	18.8	22.9	21.7	14.9	2.9	0.6	0.7	105.3
Average relative humidity (%) (at 17:30 IST)	81	78	75	78	88	93	94	92	90	84	75	74	84
Mean daily sunshine hours	5.4	5.0	4.7	4.9	4.9	2.4	2.5	3.3	3.2	5.4	6.3	6.1	4.5
Average ultraviolet index	5	6	9	11	13	15	15	14	12	9	6	4	10
Source 1: India Meteorological Department UV Index
Source 2: Deutscher Wetterdienst (sun 1891–1990)

Climate data for Jalpaiguri (1991–2020, extremes 1901–present)
Month	Jan	Feb	Mar	Apr	May	Jun	Jul	Aug	Sep	Oct	Nov	Dec	Year
Record high °C (°F)	35.4 (95.7)	35.4 (95.7)	37.3 (99.1)	40.0 (104.0)	40.4 (104.7)	39.4 (102.9)	40.9 (105.6)	38.4 (101.1)	38.8 (101.8)	38.4 (101.1)	38.4 (101.1)	35.4 (95.7)	40.9 (105.6)
Mean maximum °C (°F)	27.2 (81.0)	29.7 (85.5)	34.1 (93.4)	35.8 (96.4)	36.4 (97.5)	36.7 (98.1)	36.4 (97.5)	36.3 (97.3)	35.6 (96.1)	34.3 (93.7)	32.5 (90.5)	29.4 (84.9)	37.4 (99.3)
Mean daily maximum °C (°F)	23.5 (74.3)	26.5 (79.7)	30.1 (86.2)	31.8 (89.2)	32.2 (90.0)	32.3 (90.1)	32.1 (89.8)	32.8 (91.0)	32.0 (89.6)	31.5 (88.7)	29.4 (84.9)	26.0 (78.8)	30.1 (86.2)
Mean daily minimum °C (°F)	10.7 (51.3)	13.4 (56.1)	17.3 (63.1)	21.1 (70.0)	23.3 (73.9)	25.0 (77.0)	25.5 (77.9)	25.6 (78.1)	24.7 (76.5)	21.8 (71.2)	17.0 (62.6)	12.8 (55.0)	20.0 (68.0)
Mean minimum °C (°F)	7.7 (45.9)	9.2 (48.6)	12.8 (55.0)	16.4 (61.5)	19.7 (67.5)	21.3 (70.3)	22.7 (72.9)	23.3 (73.9)	21.5 (70.7)	18.3 (64.9)	13.8 (56.8)	8.7 (47.7)	8.4 (47.1)
Record low °C (°F)	3.8 (38.8)	2.2 (36.0)	7.8 (46.0)	10.3 (50.5)	11.5 (52.7)	15.5 (59.9)	18.1 (64.6)	18.1 (64.6)	17.7 (63.9)	15.4 (59.7)	9.4 (48.9)	5.6 (42.1)	2.2 (36.0)
Average rainfall mm (inches)	9.0 (0.35)	16.1 (0.63)	35.2 (1.39)	118.7 (4.67)	332.2 (13.08)	628.4 (24.74)	917.3 (36.11)	624.1 (24.57)	511.1 (20.12)	154.1 (6.07)	7.1 (0.28)	3.3 (0.13)	3,356.9 (132.16)
Average rainy days	0.8	1.1	2.3	6.9	12.5	17.4	21.2	17.5	14.3	5.4	0.7	0.3	100.3
Average relative humidity (%) (at 08:30 IST)	87	81	73	76	81	86	89	87	87	83	79	83	83
Source: India Meteorological Department

Climate data for Santiniketan (Sriniketan) (1991–2020, extremes 1961–2020)
Month	Jan	Feb	Mar	Apr	May	Jun	Jul	Aug	Sep	Oct	Nov	Dec	Year
Record high °C (°F)	33.0 (91.4)	37.0 (98.6)	42.0 (107.6)	45.9 (114.6)	46.6 (115.9)	47.0 (116.6)	41.6 (106.9)	36.8 (98.2)	39.1 (102.4)	37.1 (98.8)	34.2 (93.6)	31.8 (89.2)	47.0 (116.6)
Mean daily maximum °C (°F)	24.7 (76.5)	28.5 (83.3)	33.6 (92.5)	36.5 (97.7)	36.7 (98.1)	35.4 (95.7)	33.1 (91.6)	32.8 (91.0)	32.8 (91.0)	31.9 (89.4)	29.7 (85.5)	26.1 (79.0)	31.8 (89.2)
Mean daily minimum °C (°F)	11.1 (52.0)	14.6 (58.3)	19.4 (66.9)	23.5 (74.3)	25.1 (77.2)	26.1 (79.0)	26.1 (79.0)	26.1 (79.0)	25.5 (77.9)	22.5 (72.5)	17.3 (63.1)	12.7 (54.9)	20.8 (69.4)
Record low °C (°F)	4.9 (40.8)	6.0 (42.8)	11.2 (52.2)	14.6 (58.3)	18.1 (64.6)	18.7 (65.7)	20.0 (68.0)	22.4 (72.3)	17.7 (63.9)	15.6 (60.1)	9.7 (49.5)	6.1 (43.0)	4.9 (40.8)
Average rainfall mm (inches)	12.6 (0.50)	20.2 (0.80)	28.4 (1.12)	53.9 (2.12)	113.1 (4.45)	216.2 (8.51)	341.9 (13.46)	290.7 (11.44)	258.4 (10.17)	102.9 (4.05)	5.9 (0.23)	8.6 (0.34)	1,452.7 (57.19)
Average rainy days	1.2	1.7	1.9	3.6	6.3	11.2	15.6	14.5	11.3	4.8	0.7	0.4	73.3
Average relative humidity (%) (at 17:30 IST)	60	52	45	50	59	73	82	82	83	80	70	65	67
Source: India Meteorological Department

Climate data for Behrampore (1981–2007, extremes 1901–2012)
Month	Jan	Feb	Mar	Apr	May	Jun	Jul	Aug	Sep	Oct	Nov	Dec	Year
Record high °C (°F)	34.9 (94.8)	37.2 (99.0)	44.5 (112.1)	46.4 (115.5)	48.3 (118.9)	46.9 (116.4)	40.4 (104.7)	42.4 (108.3)	40.3 (104.5)	39.5 (103.1)	37.8 (100.0)	34.0 (93.2)	48.3 (118.9)
Mean maximum °C (°F)	28.7 (83.7)	32.8 (91.0)	38.3 (100.9)	40.7 (105.3)	41.2 (106.2)	39.4 (102.9)	36.0 (96.8)	35.9 (96.6)	36.0 (96.8)	35.8 (96.4)	33.6 (92.5)	30.2 (86.4)	42.4 (108.3)
Mean daily maximum °C (°F)	25.5 (77.9)	29.0 (84.2)	34.0 (93.2)	37.0 (98.6)	36.5 (97.7)	34.9 (94.8)	33.0 (91.4)	33.2 (91.8)	33.1 (91.6)	33.0 (91.4)	31.0 (87.8)	27.3 (81.1)	32.3 (90.1)
Mean daily minimum °C (°F)	12.2 (54.0)	15.5 (59.9)	19.8 (67.6)	23.7 (74.7)	25.0 (77.0)	26.1 (79.0)	26.1 (79.0)	26.3 (79.3)	25.8 (78.4)	23.9 (75.0)	19.1 (66.4)	14.3 (57.7)	21.5 (70.7)
Mean minimum °C (°F)	8.9 (48.0)	11.5 (52.7)	15.4 (59.7)	19.3 (66.7)	20.9 (69.6)	23.2 (73.8)	24.0 (75.2)	24.0 (75.2)	23.4 (74.1)	20.3 (68.5)	14.9 (58.8)	10.9 (51.6)	8.8 (47.8)
Record low °C (°F)	3.9 (39.0)	5.0 (41.0)	8.9 (48.0)	15.0 (59.0)	15.3 (59.5)	16.6 (61.9)	21.0 (69.8)	19.6 (67.3)	21.1 (70.0)	15.6 (60.1)	8.3 (46.9)	5.7 (42.3)	3.9 (39.0)
Average rainfall mm (inches)	8.2 (0.32)	17.7 (0.70)	22.3 (0.88)	52.4 (2.06)	129.4 (5.09)	229.2 (9.02)	293.7 (11.56)	269.7 (10.62)	298.5 (11.75)	126.7 (4.99)	9.9 (0.39)	7.6 (0.30)	1,465.5 (57.70)
Average rainy days	0.8	1.4	1.9	3.0	6.6	12	13.5	13.7	12.6	5.1	0.8	0.5	71.8
Average relative humidity (%) (at 17:30 IST)	63	60	53	58	68	79	85	84	84	78	67	65	70
Source: India Meteorological Department
