= North Bengal plains =

Geological region in eastern India

The North Bengal plains start from the south of Terai region and continue up to the left bank of the Ganges. The southern parts of the Jalpaiguri, North Dinajpur (baring some extreme northern regions), South Dinajpur, Malda and Cooch Behar districts constitute this geographical region. The narrow land mass in the North Dinajpur district is known as Mahananda corridor. This corridor runs north to south joining Malda with the plains of Jalpaiguri, Alipurduar and Cooch Behar. The entire part of North and South Dinajpur is silt laden plain.

== Formation ==
The North Bengal Plain was developed by the deposition of both the Ganga-Brahmaputra River system. The deposition mainly occurs in the Rajmahal-Garo gap located between the Shillong plateau and the Chottanagpur plateau and continues up to the Sundarban region, and mostly composed by the Quaternary deposits of fluvial origin. The Himalayan origin sediments deposited in the Himalayan foreland basin and formed the North Bengal Plain, and its modification still continues today.

The region also is home to many medicinal plants.
