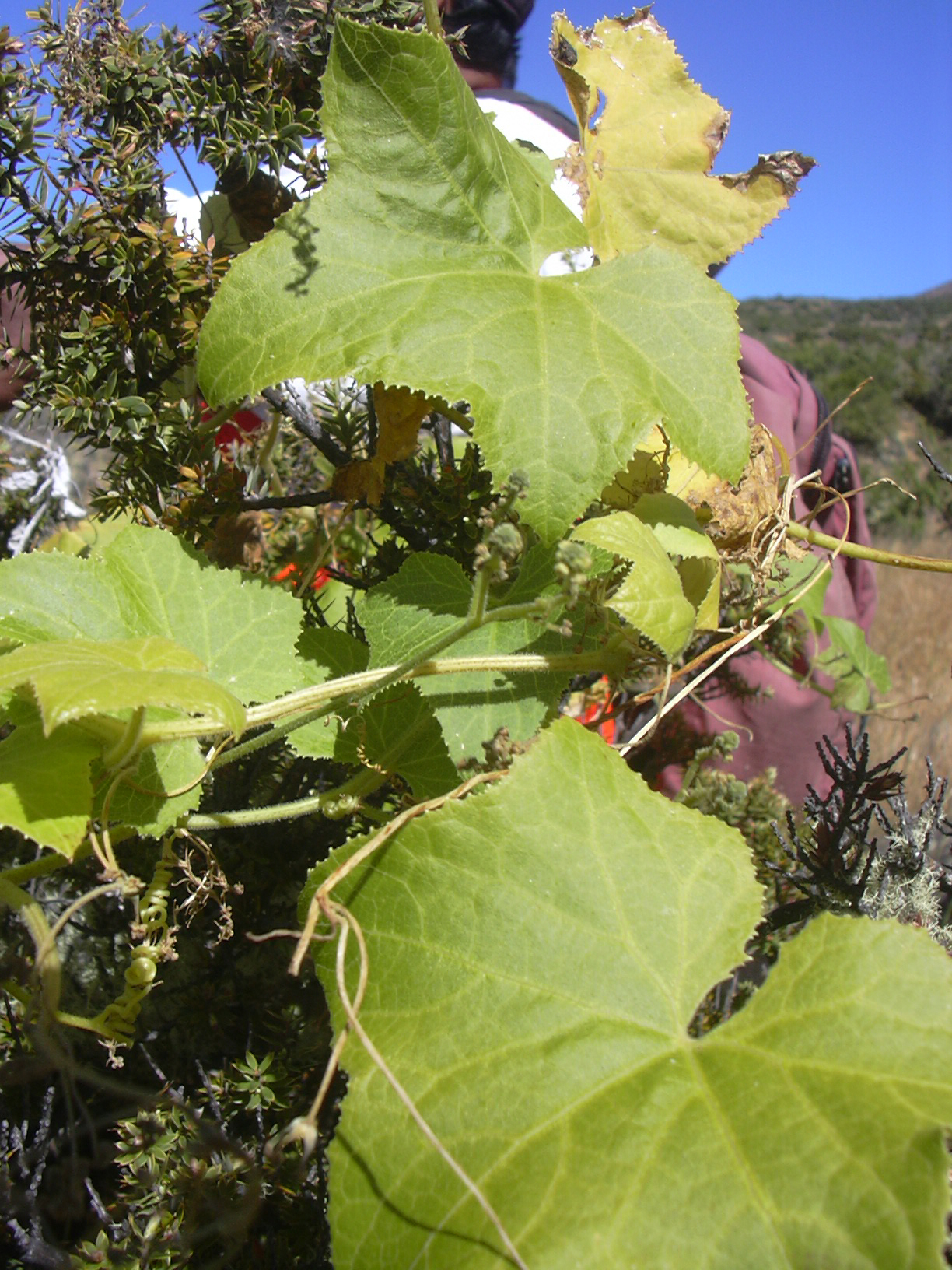

Conservation status
- Critically Imperiled (NatureServe)

Scientific classification
- Kingdom: Plantae
- Clade: Tracheophytes
- Clade: Angiosperms
- Clade: Eudicots
- Clade: Rosids
- Order: Cucurbitales
- Family: Cucurbitaceae
- Genus: Sicyos
- Species: S. macrophyllus

Binomial name
- Sicyos macrophyllus A.Gray

= Sicyos macrophyllus =

Species of flowering plant

Sicyos macrophyllus is a rare species of flowering plant in the Cucurbitaceae, the squash family. It is endemic to Hawaii where it is present only on the island of Hawaii. It has likely been extirpated from the island of Maui. Common names include alpine bur cucumber, largeleaf bur-cucumber, and 'anunu.

This is a perennial herb producing vines up to 15 meters long and 4 centimeters thick. They are supported with tendrils. The stems are slightly hairy and have black spots. The leaves are lobed. They are hairless on the upper surface and hairy underneath. The flowers are greenish yellow and the fruit is round.

This plant can be found on the island of Hawaii at elevations between 1200 and 2000 meters. It lives in wet ʻōhiʻa lehua-dominated forest and subalpine forests dominated by māmane and naio. It occurs in Hawaiʻi Volcanoes National Park.

There are approximately 24 to 26 individuals of this species in existence. It is not a federally listed endangered or threatened species, but the United States government made it a candidate for protection in 1990. The United States Fish and Wildlife Service considers the plant "highly threatened" and the threats are considered "imminent". However, it does not consider emergency listing necessary as of 2010.

Habitat destruction is a main cause of the species' decline. Feral pigs, sheep, and cattle destroy native plants and cause erosion of the hilly habitat. They are also vectors for the seeds of introduced species of plants, including several types of noxious weed. Cattle will also consume S. macrophyllus directly.

Another threat to the species is competition from alien plant species. The worst offenders are fountain grass, kikuyu grass, and German ivy. Alien species smother other vegetation, compete for resources, pose a fire hazard, and prevent the establishment of other species' seedlings. Some even release allelopathic chemicals that prevent other plants from growing.

The National Park Service is attempting to prevent the extinction of this species. It has erected fences around some of the few individuals that survive today. It also tries to control invasive plants. The National Tropical Botanical Garden has some seed samples.
