= List of coconut dishes =

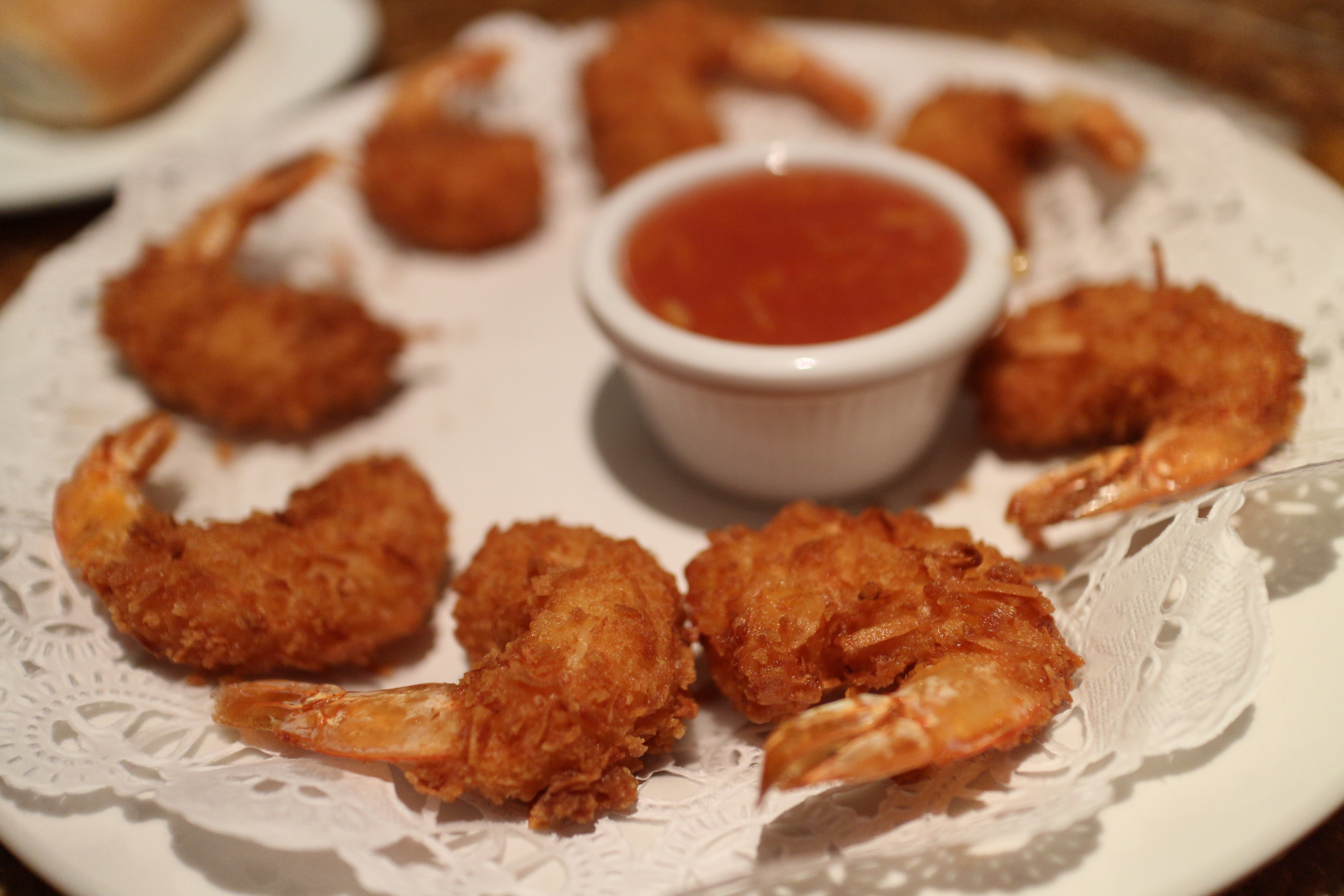
Coconut shrimp with a dipping sauce

This is a list of notable coconut dishes and foods that use coconut as a primary ingredient. The term coconut can refer to the entire coconut palm or the seed, or the fruit, which, botanically, is a drupe, not a nut.

== Coconut dishes ==
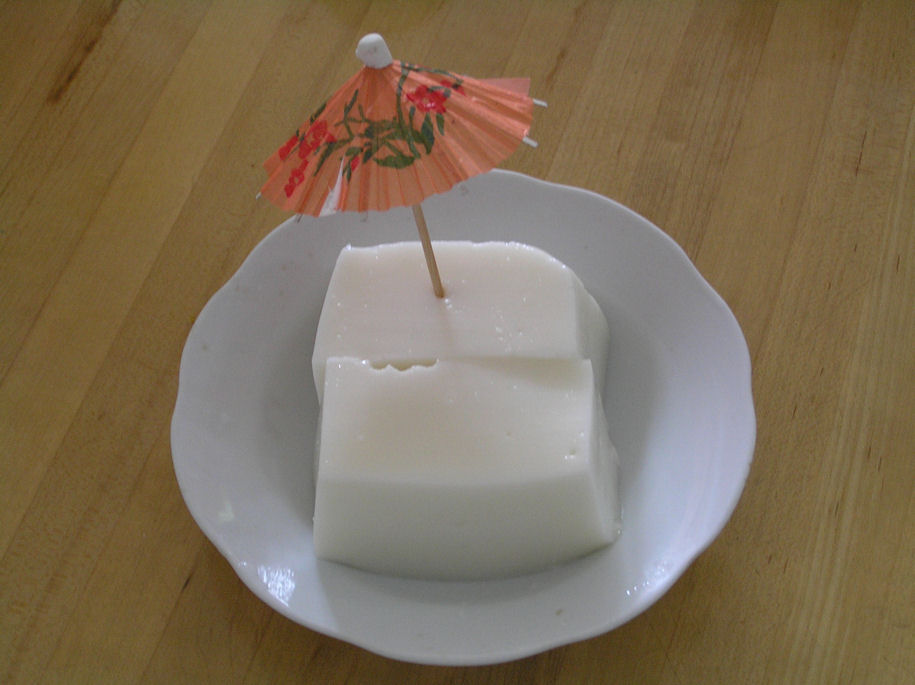
Coconut bars

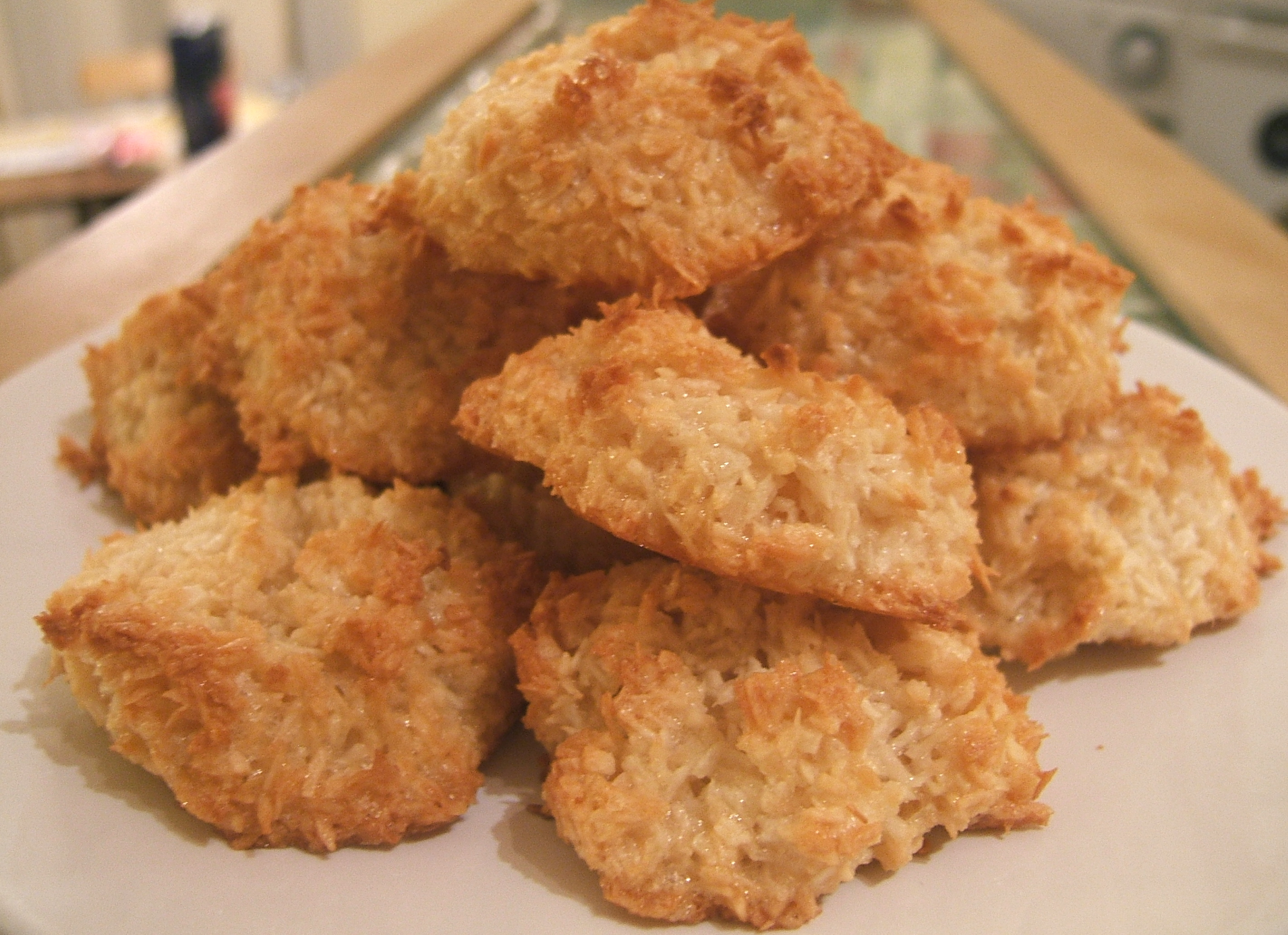
Coconut macaroons

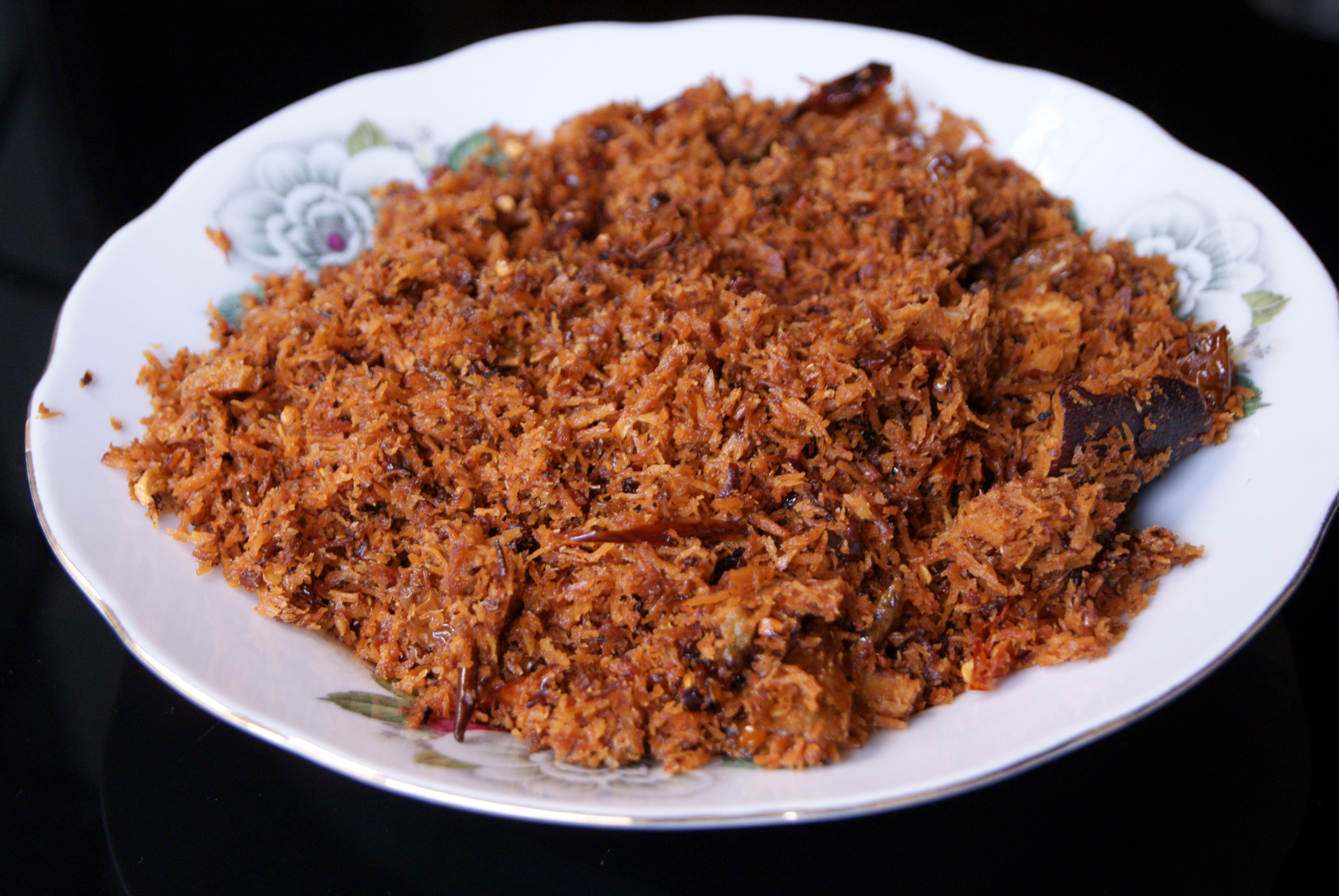
Serundeng

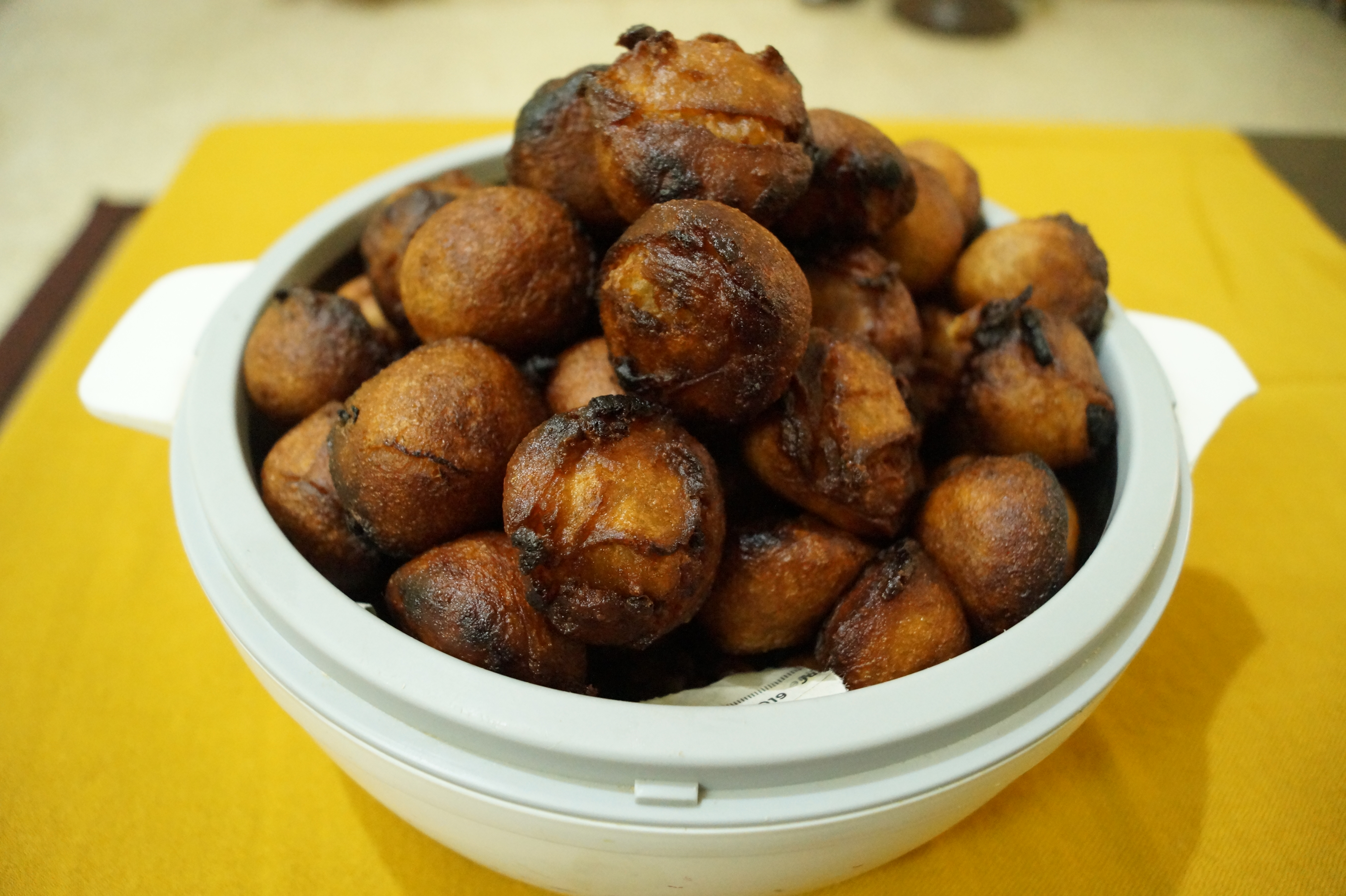
Unni appam

- Almond Joy – Candy bar – a candy
- Anzac biscuit – Sweet oat biscuit
- Bánh bò – Vietnamese rice flour-based sponge cake
- Baye baye – Filipino rice dish
- Beijinho – Brazilian birthday party candy
- Bibikkan – Sri Lankan coconut cake
- Binakol – Filipino chicken soup
- Boston bun – Sweet roll with spices and thick icing
- Botok – Indonesian traditional coconut dish
- Bounty – Mars Inc. brand of coconut-filled chocolate bar – a chocolate bar
- Bua loi – Thai dessert
- Bukayo – Filipino coconut dessert
- Buko pie – Filipino coconut custard pie
- Buntil – Indonesian grated coconut meat dish
- Burasa – Indonesian rice dumpling
- Butter mochi – Hawaiian cake
- Cascaron – Filipino doughnut
- Chokladboll – Type of confectionery popular in Sweden
- Cocadas – Traditional coconut confection found in Latin America
- Cocktail bun – Sweet bun with coconut
- Coconut bar – Chilled, gelatinous dessert made from coconut milk
- Coconut cake – Cake with white frosting and covered in coconut flakes
- Coconut candy – Candy made with coconut or coconut flavoring
- Coconut chutney – South Indian chutney
- Coconut cream – Liquid extracted from coconuts
- Coconut cream pie – Custard based pie
- Coconut doughnut – Type of doughnut in the United States and Canada
- Coconut drop – Jamaican coconut dessert
- Coconut ice – Type of British confectionery candy
- Coconut jam – Jam made with coconut milk
- Coconut milk – Liquid extracted from coconuts
- Coconut milk powder – Culinary ingredient
- Coconut oil – Edible oil derived from coconut
- Coconut rice – Coconut-flavoured rice
- Coconut shrimp – Shrimp dish
- Coconut soup – Soup prepared using coconut as a main ingredient
- Coconut sugar – Sugar produced from the coconut palm
- Coconut water – Clear liquid inside coconuts
- Creamed coconut – Food product
- Dadar gulung – Indonesian coconut pancake
- Dodol – Southeast Asian sweet toffee
- Es goyobod – Indonesian coconut milk based cold beverage
- Es kelapa muda – Indonesian coconut ice
- Es teler – Indonesian fruit cocktail
- Espasol – Cylinder-shaped Filipino rice cake
- Frejon – Coconut bean soup
- Geplak – Indonesian sweet snack, originating from Java
- German chocolate cake – Layered chocolate cake named after Samuel German
- Gizzada – Tart with coconut filling
- Grater cake – Coconut dessert
- Gulha – Tuna and coconut dumplings
- Halo-halo – Filipino dessert
- Haupia – Polynesian coconut milk pudding
- Inubaran – Filipino chicken stew or soup
- Kakara pitha – India deep-fried cake
- Kalamai – Traditional Chamorro corn and coconut pudding
- Kalamay – Filipino sweet
- Kalathappam – Indian dessert
- Kẹo dừa – Vietnamese coconut candy
- Kerak telor – Indonesian spicy omelette dish
- Kerisik – Traditional Malay condiment
- Khanom krok – Thai dessert cooked in a mortar pan – Thai coconut rice pancake
- Khanom sane chan – Thai dessert
- Klappertaart – Indonesian traditional cake
- Klepon – Southeast Asian traditional rice cake
- Kluai buat chi – Thai dessert
- Kobbari Lavuju
- Kolak (food) – Indonesian dessert
- Kopyor coconut – Coconut cultivar with little coconut water
- Kora Khai
- Kozhukkatta – Dumpling made from rice flour
- Kralan – South and Southeast Asian rice dish
- Kue putu – Southeast Asian rice cake
- Kue putu mangkok – Indonesian steamed cupcake
- Kuku Paka – African chicken dish
- Kumut – a thick aromatic coconut cream in Indonesian cuisine. Used as an ingredient in nasi liwet.
- Kutsinta – Filipino steam rice cake
- Laing – Filipino dish
- Laksa – Spicy noodle dish from Southeast Asia
- Lamington – Australian cake
- Latik – Filipino dessert garnishing and condiment
- Lawar – Indonesian meat and vegetable dish
- Linapay – Filipino dish
- Macaroon – Type of cookie - a cookie
- Maja blanca – Filipino pudding of coconut milk and cornstarch
- Mampostial – Puerto Rican dessert
- Manjar branco – Brazilian coconut pudding
- Mas huni – Maldivian dish
- Modak – South and Southeast Asian sweet dumpling dish
- Mounds – Candy bar by Hershey – a candy
- Nasi liwet – Central Javanese rice dish
- Nata de coco – Chewy, jelly-like food produced by fermenting coconut water
- Nuomici – Glutinous rice pastry with coconut powder and mungo cream
- Oil down – Grenadian stew
- Olho-de-sogra – Brazilian candy
- Otap – Puff pastry cookie
- Palitaw – Rice cake eaten in the Philippines
- Pancit buko – Filipino dish
- Pan de coco – Philippine sweet bread
- Patoleo – Indian stuffed turmeric leaf wraps
- Pitsi-pitsî – Filipino cassava dessert
- Po'e – Polynesian pudding
- Pol sambola – Sri Lankan dish made from coconut
- Pumpkin-coconut custard – Southeast Asian dessert
- Puto – Type of steamed rice cake
- Puttu – South Indian breakfast dish
- Queijadinha – Portuguese confection
- Quindim – Typical Brazilian dessert
- Ruske kape – Balkan cake dessert
- Sapin-sapin – Glutinous rice and coconut dish in Filipino cuisine
- Sayur lodeh – Indonesian vegetable soup dish
- Serabi – Indonesian type of pancake
- Serundeng – Indonesian spiced grated coconut
- Sno Balls – American chocolate cake confection
- Sorbetes – Filipino ice cream – a coconut milk ice cream
- Sugar cake – Confectionery made from sugar
- Tembleque – Coconut dessert pudding from Puerto Rico
- Toto – Jamaican cake made with coconut milk
- Unni appam – South Indian snack
- Urap – Indonesian traditional salad dish
- Watalappam – Custard pudding
- White Christmas – Australian dessert
- Wingko – Indonesian traditional pancake dish

== See also ==
- Coconut milk – Liquid extracted from coconuts
- Coconut candy
- List of dishes using coconut milk
- List of fruit dishes
- Lists of prepared foods
