= Pancit buko =

Filipino dish

- Alternative names: pancit butong
- Course: Soup
- Place of origin: Philippines
- Serving temperature: Hot
- Main ingredients: Young coconut meat

Pancit buko (Tagalog for "young coconut noodles", also known as pancit butong in Visayan) is a Filipino dish made from very thin strips of young coconut (buko) meat with various spices, vegetables, and meat or seafood. It is a type of Filipino noodle dish (pancit), even though it usually does not include traditional noodles.

Recipes vary and often adapt other Filipino pancit dishes. It has two main types: a broth version and a stir-fried (guisado) version. The stir-fried version often uses latik and coconut oil derived from coconut cream (kakang gata). Pancit buko is commonly served directly in an opened coconut shell.

The dish originates independently from both the Tagalog people, specifically from Quezon and Laguna, and the Visayan people. Visayan versions sometimes include wheat noodles, distinguishing them from the Tagalog versions.

== See also ==
- Batchoy
- Cuisine of the Philippines
- Ginataan
- List of coconut dishes
