= Bibikkan =

Sri Lankan coconut cake

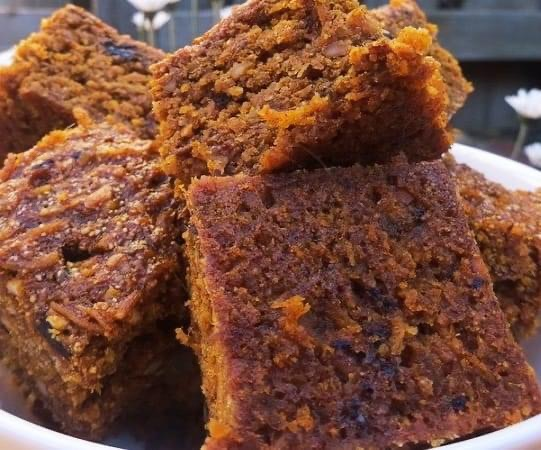
- Alternative names: Pol cake, Sri Lankan coconut cake
- Type: Cake
- Course: Dessert
- Place of origin: Sri Lanka
- Serving temperature: Cooled
- Main ingredients: Coconut, Jaggery, Semolina, Spices
- Variations: Brown sugar, rice flour

Bibikkan (Sinhala: බිබික්කන්) is a traditional Sri Lankan coconut cake. It is a dark moist cake made of shredded coconut, jaggery (from the sap of the toddy palm) and semolina combined with a mixture of spices. Bibikkan is commonly prepared and consumed in celebration of festive and religious occasions, including Christmas, New Year's Eve, Sinhala and Tamil New Year.

== Origins and history ==
Bibikkan is believed to have been introduced to Sri Lanka by the Portuguese, who colonised the coastal areas of the island in 1505 and remained until 1658. Goan Catholics serve a similar dish called Bebinca, which is almost identical to Bibingka, a traditional Filipino rice flour cake made with coconut milk, which is served on Christmas Day. Historically the Mount Lavinia area has been associated with the production of Bibikkan, known locally as Poranu appa.

== Description ==
The main ingredients of bibikan are jaggery, an unrefined syrup from the sap of the Kithul palm tree; dry roasted semolina (Uppama) or rice flour; and grated or shredded coconut. It is easy to make without beating, whisking, or any appliances.

== See also ==
- Cuisine of Sri Lanka
- List of cakes
- List of coconut dishes
