= Ounhmangu =

Burmese traditional food

- Alternative names: အုန်းမှန်ကူ
- Place of origin: Myanmar
- Associated cuisine: Burmese cuisine
- Main ingredients: Shredded coconut; sugar; oil

Ounhmangu (Burmese: အုန်းမှန်ကူ; pronounced [ʔóʊɴm̥àɴɡù]) is a type of shredded coconut candy popular in Myanmar (Burma), and is made from sugar, shredded coconut, and oil.

== See also ==
- Coconut candy
