= Coconut ice =

Type of British confectionery

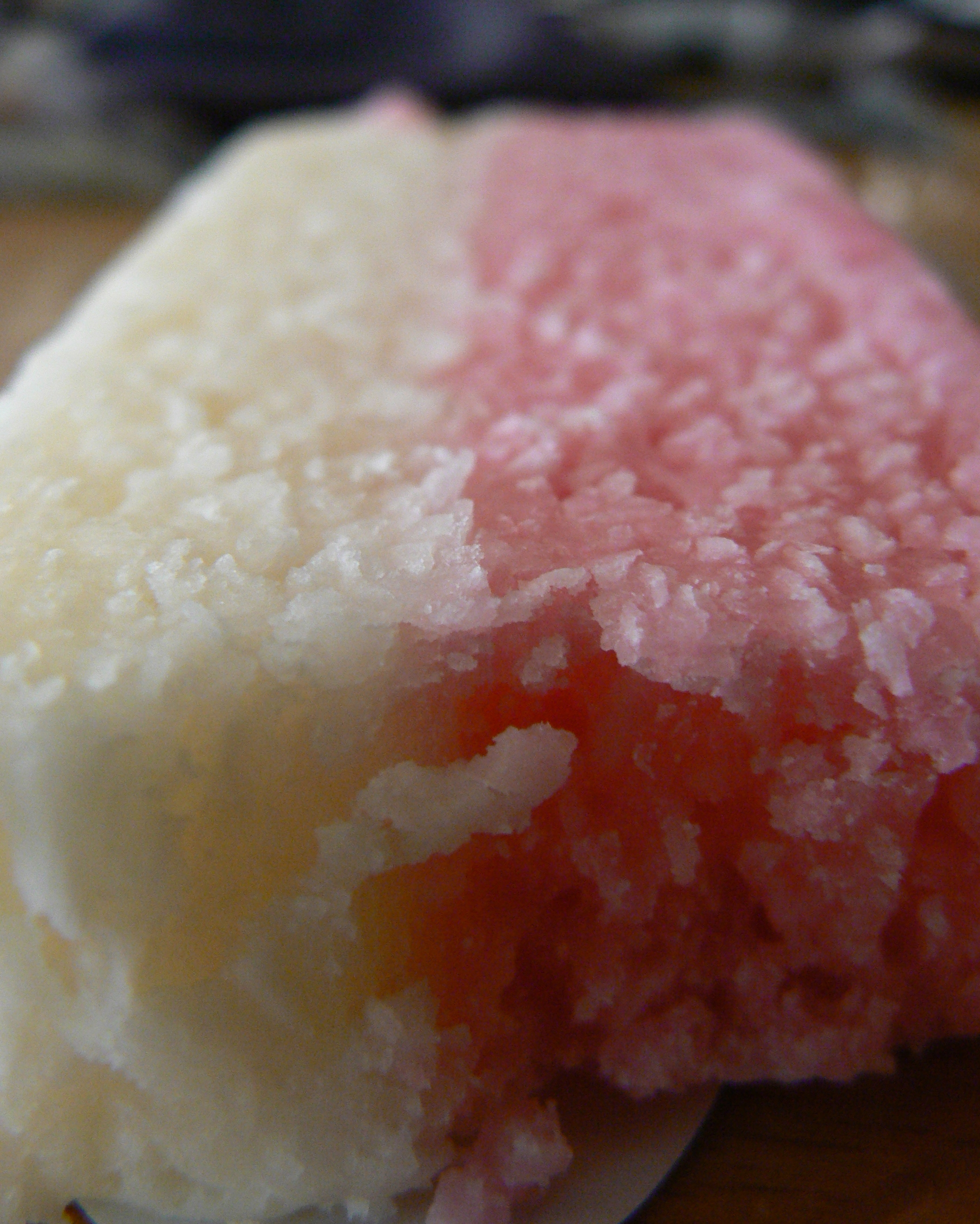
One version of coconut ice

Coconut ice (in obsolete spelling, cocoanut ice) is a British solid soft confectionery prepared using grated desiccated coconut or just grated coconut, condensed milk and sugar. It typically has a chewy, soft and mildly grainy texture; some versions are semi-hard. Coconut ice is also available in South Africa, some areas of Australia, and New Zealand.

Pink food colouring is sometimes added, often on half of the sweet, resulting in pink and white colouration. This is done by layering the coloured mixture with a separate layer of uncoloured product, and then slicing the result into individual pieces. In modern versions, honey gelatin is sometimes also used as an ingredient.

== History ==
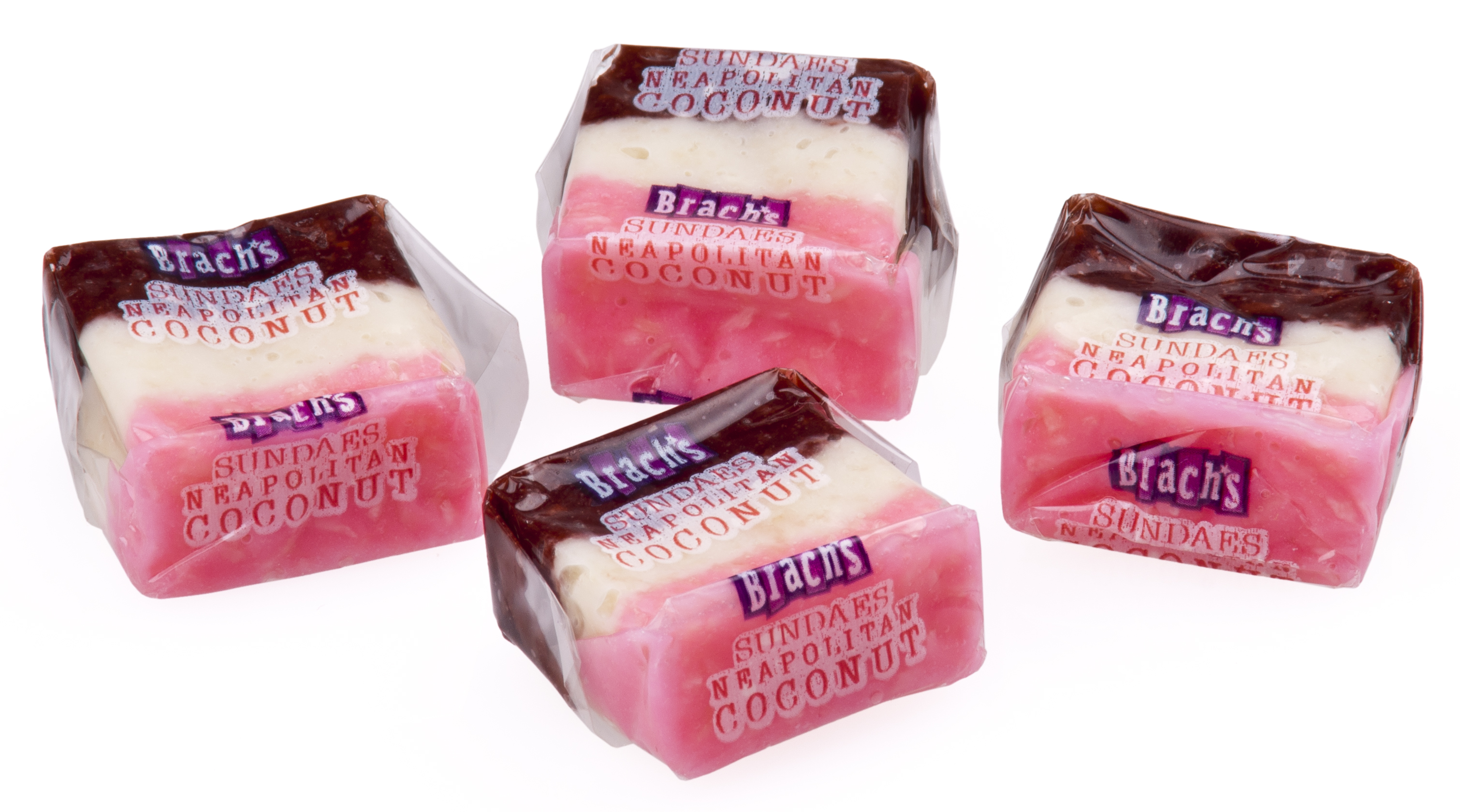
American candy made by Brach's

Coconut ice was traditionally prepared at home in Britain, traditionally using coconut and boiled sugar syrup. Early versions using sugar syrup had a short shelf life, sometimes dried out and became excessively grainy in texture, and sometimes fermented. The origin of use of the word "ice" in the confectionery's name is not known, but it may have derived from its general appearance and colouration.

An Australian recipe for "cocoanut ice" [sic] included the ingredient copha, an Australian form of vegetable fat shortening made from hydrogenated coconut oil also referred to as "white cloud".

In America, a similar pre-packaged confection is sold under the name Neapolitan Coconut by Brach's and similar names by other confectioners. They typically add a third layer that is flavored with chocolate.

== See also ==
- Coconut candy
- List of British desserts
- List of coconut dishes
