= Coconut candy =

Candy made with coconut or coconut flavoring

- Type: Confectionery
- Place of origin: Việt Nam
- Region or state: Vĩnh Long province
- Main ingredients: Coconut, malt syrup, sugar

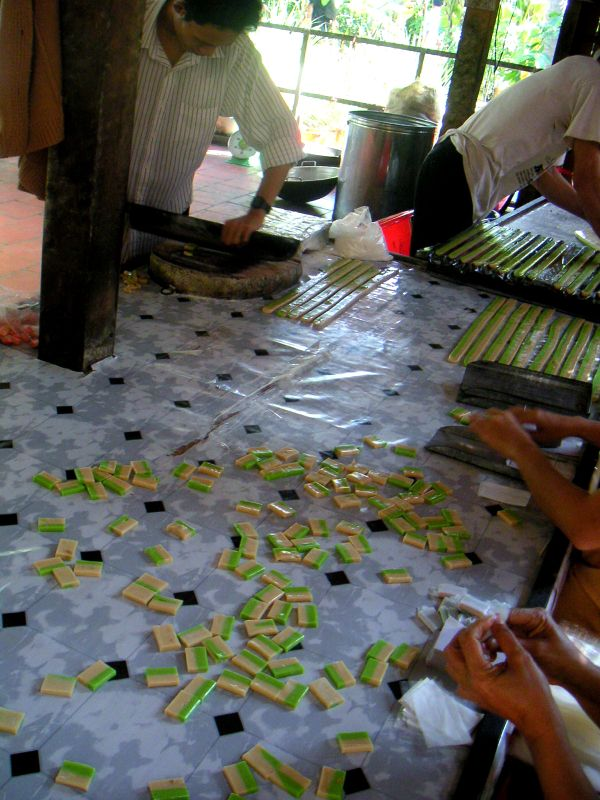
Traditional process of producing kẹo dừa

Coconut candy refers to various candies made with coconut or coconut flavorings.

In Vietnamese cuisine, kẹo dừa is most commonly produced in Bến Tre province (now Vĩnh Long province), using coconut milk and coconut cream.

In the United States, coconut candy was sometimes spelled as cocoanut candy. These included various traditional confections in the United States. Mason Pecan Cocoanut Candy was made in the 1950s in Milprint, Milwaukee. Squirrel Brand made Cocoanut Zippers. There was also a Mason Cherry Cocoanut candy produced in Mineola, New York. Welch's made Cocoanut Candy Bar from Hinde & Dauch. Welch's Cocoanut candy was also produced by the James O. Welch Company.

Sauerkraut candy is made with grated coconut. Grated coconut is often used in various chocolate confections.

== About Coconut Candy ==
=== Manufacturing process ===
The production of Vietnamese coconut candy starts with the grating of fresh coconut flesh. The grated flesh is then pressed to extract coconut milk and coconut cream. The next step is the addition of malt syrup and sugar to this mixture of coconut milk and cream. The ratio of the various ingredients is a closely guarded secret of individual coconut candy manufacturers. The mixing process is often entrusted only to family members of the factory owner. Slight variations in the ingredient ratios can lead to very different texture and taste in the final product.

The mixture is then heated to a very high temperature in large woks over fires generated by the burning of coconut shells. While being heated, the mixture is stirred continuously to ensure even heat distribution. Traditionally, this stirring process was done manually with large wooden paddles. In larger modern manufacturing facilities, these paddles have been replaced by electric motors. The mixture eventually caramelises to a thicker texture. Recognising when the mixture has been cooked to the right level is more of an art than an exact science. While it is still hot and soft, the thickened mixture is then stringed out into moulds and allowed to cool. The final step sees the candy strings cut into rectangular lozenges, then wrapped and packaged.

Traditionally, coconut candy is wrapped in two layers of wrappings. The inner layer is edible rice paper, and the outer layer is paper soaked in vegetable oil. These measures were necessary to stop the candy from sticking to the paper wrapping. Larger manufacturers now use heat-sealed foil paper, which does not stick to the candy.

=== Economic importance ===
Vĩnh Long currently has over one hundred coconut candy manufacturers, making up thirty percent of local enterprises. However, the market is dominated by a handful of well-known brands, with most manufacturers producing candy under licence for these brands. Coconut candy is sold throughout Vietnam. It is also exported to other Asian countries, Australia, Europe, and North America.

== Coconut candy types ==
- Bounty (chocolate bar) contains coconut (it is known as Bounty outside of the U.S.)
- Coconut ice
- Ferrero Raffaello
- Perle de coco
- Ounhmangu
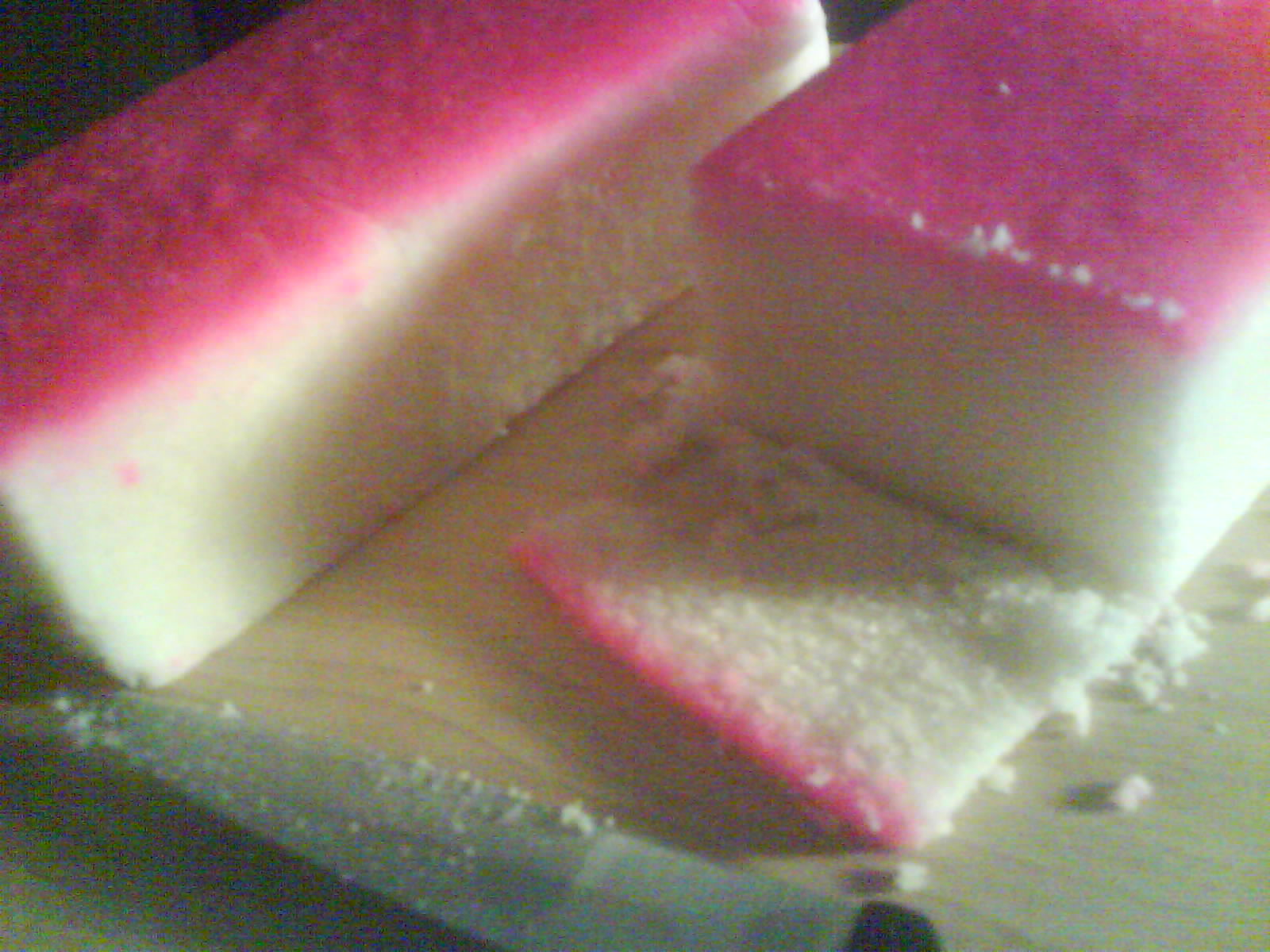
Alfajor from Mexico

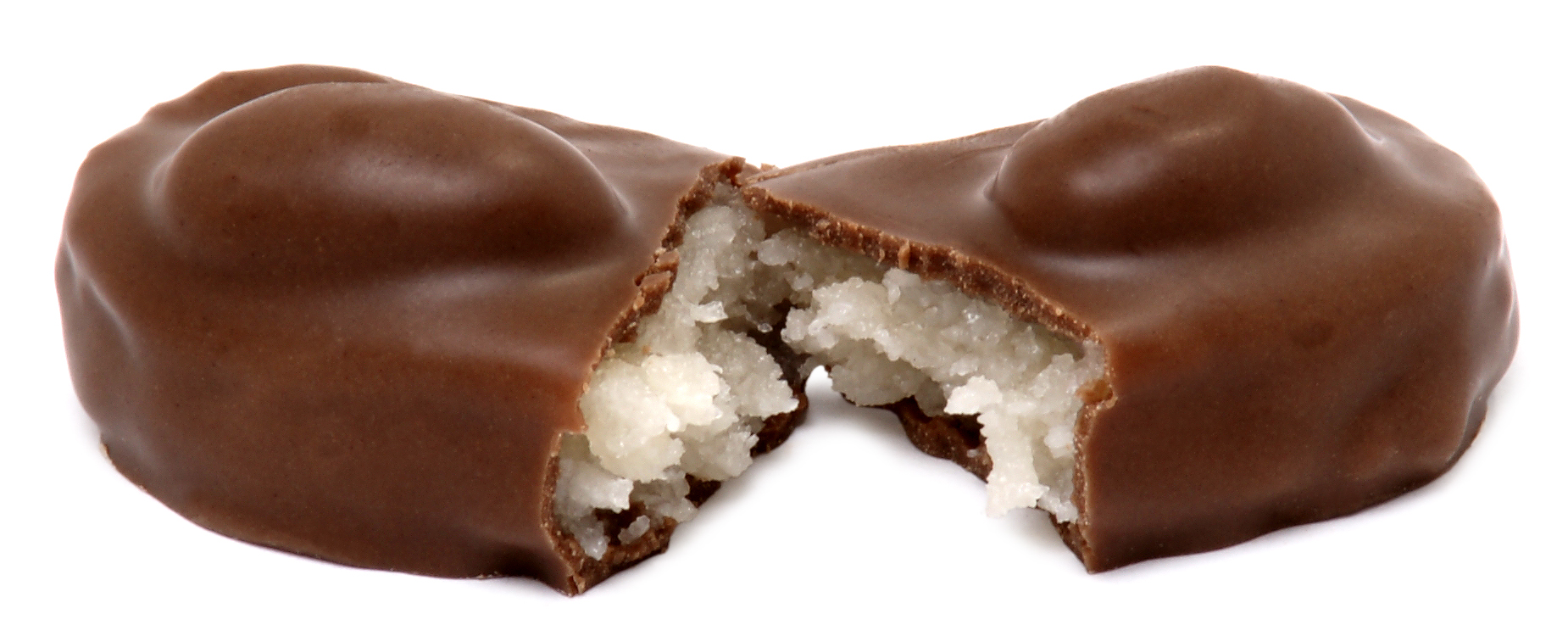
Almond Joy

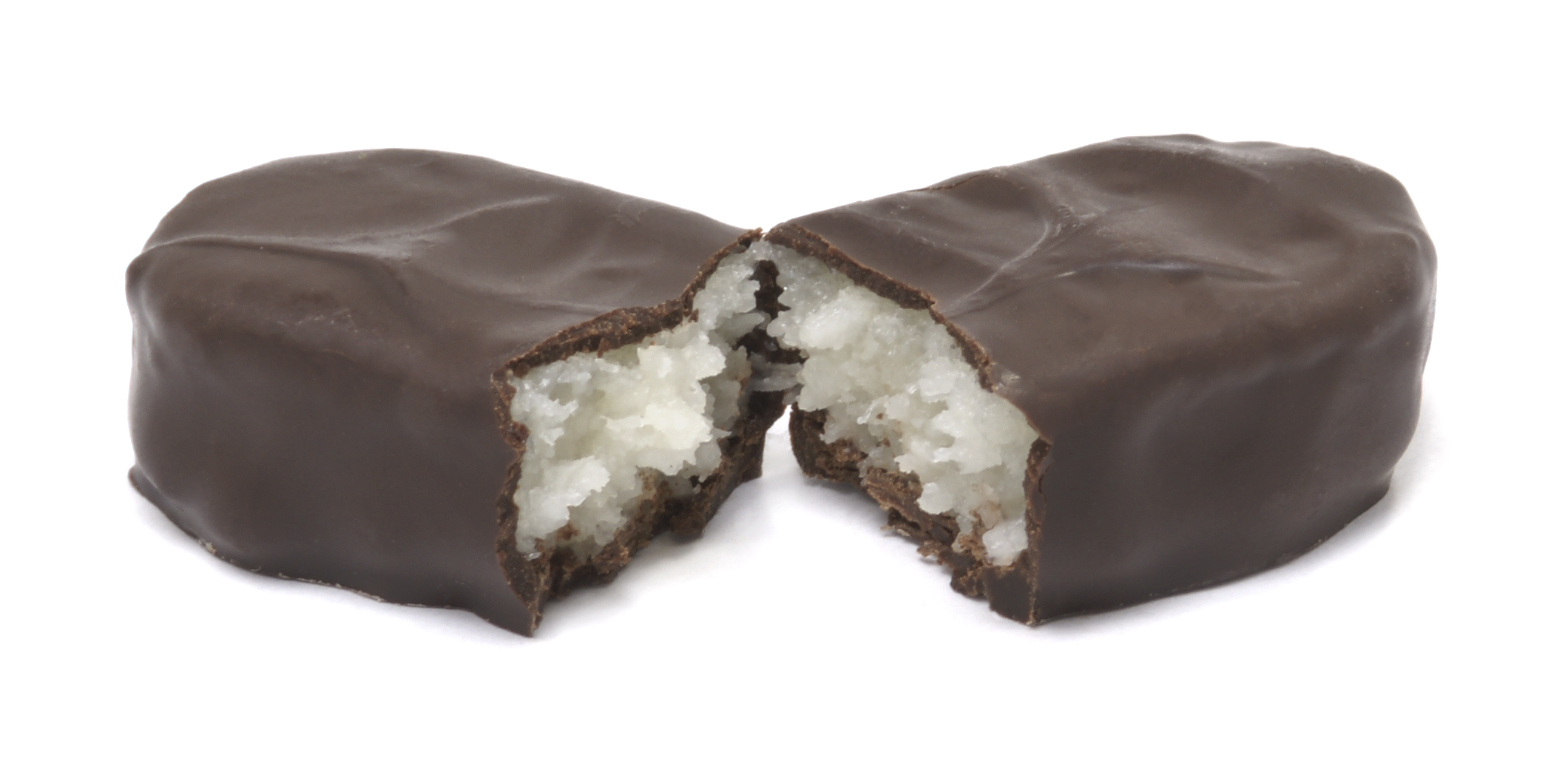
Mounds (candy)

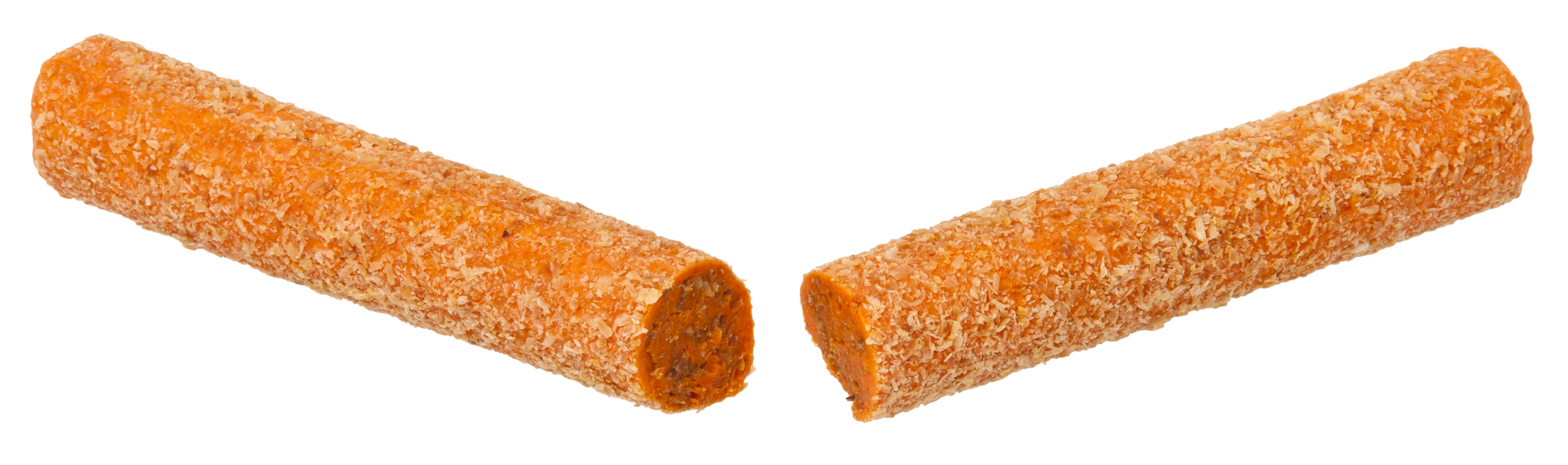
Chick-O-Stick

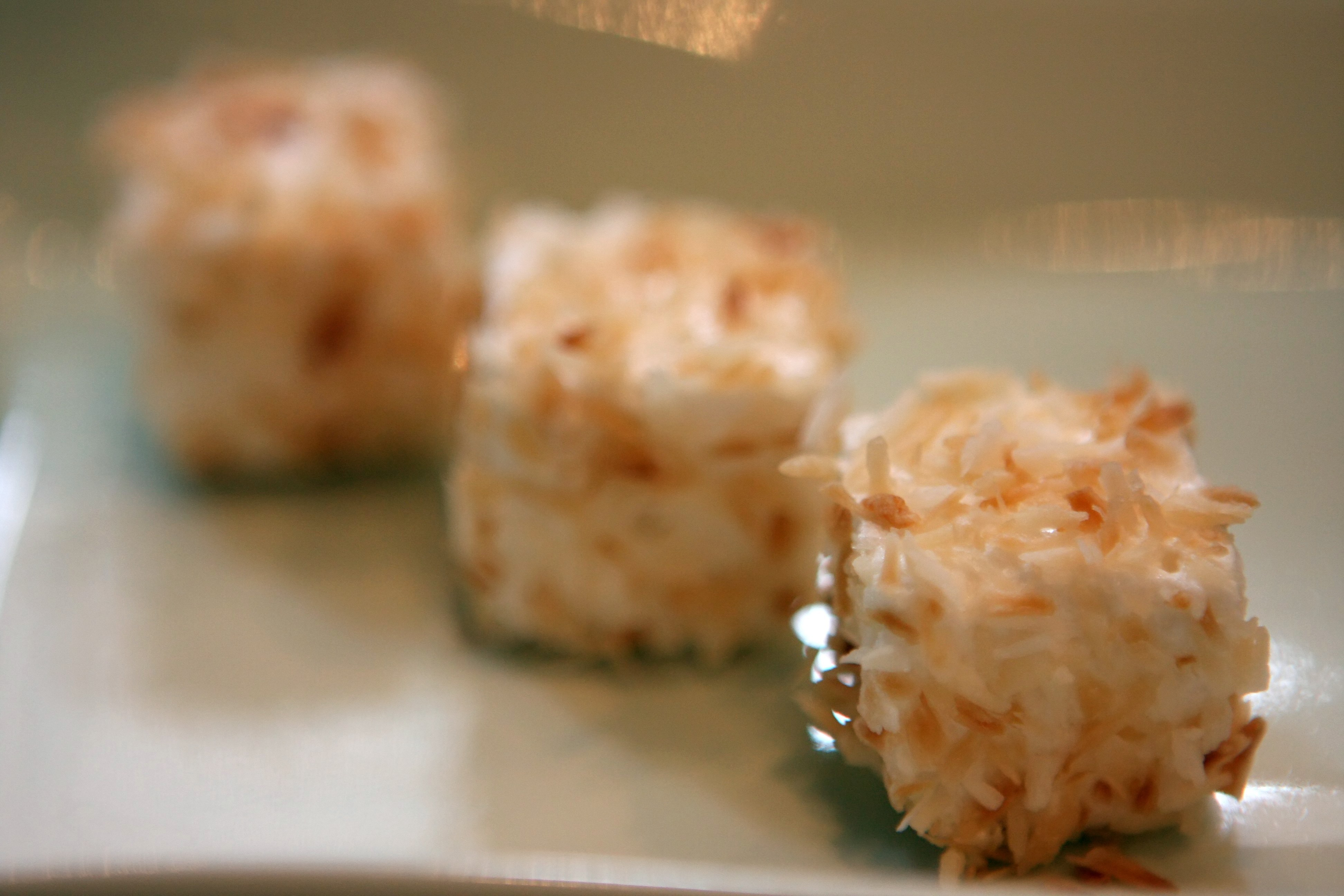
Chikalicious coconut marshmallow

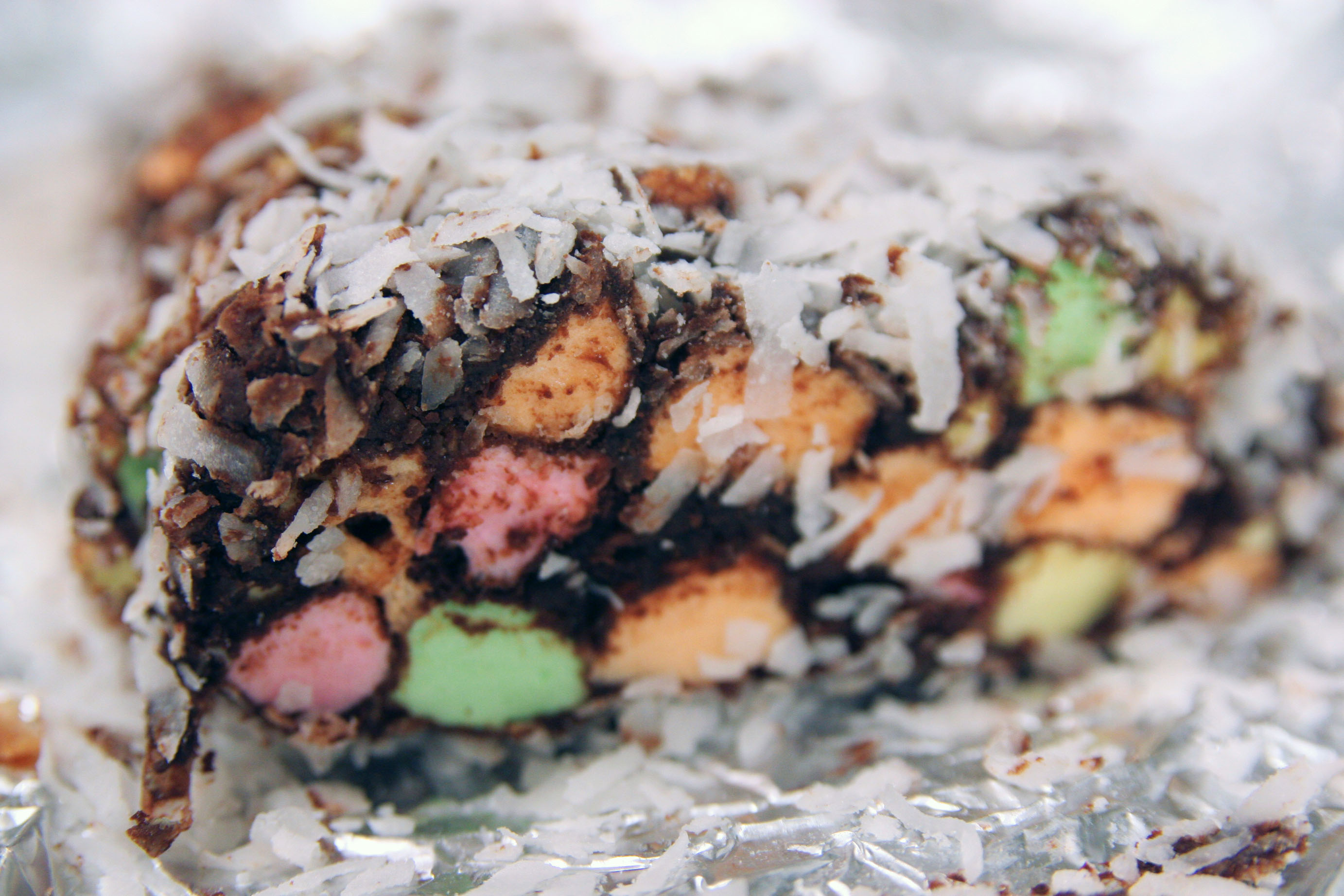
Church Windows dessert

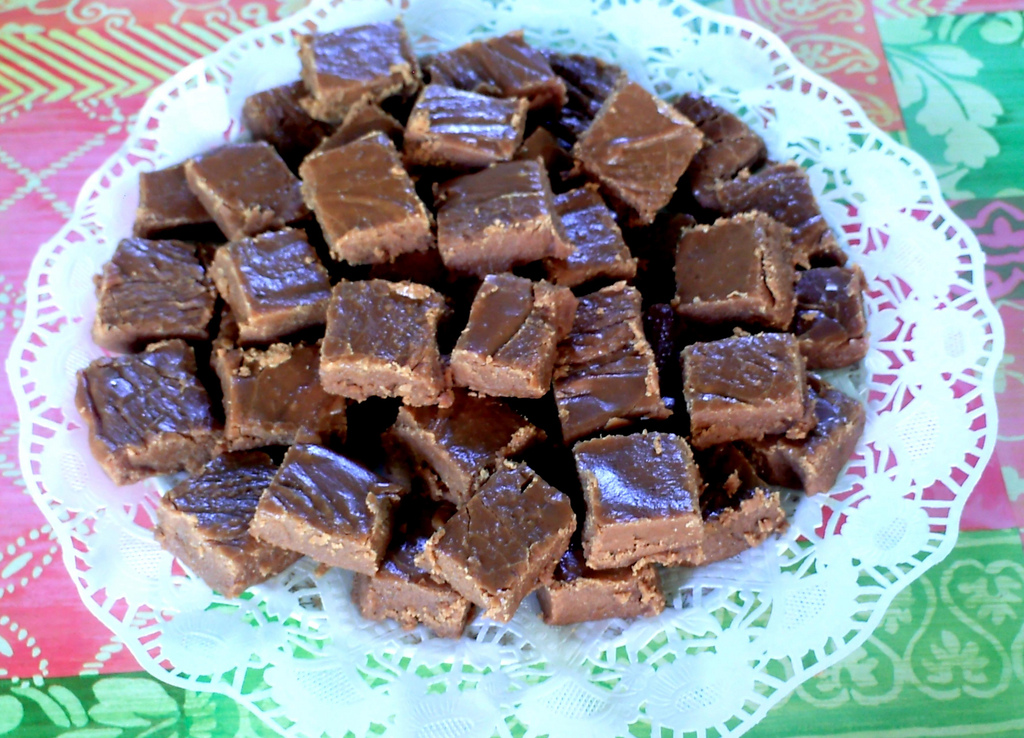
Doucelette with coconut

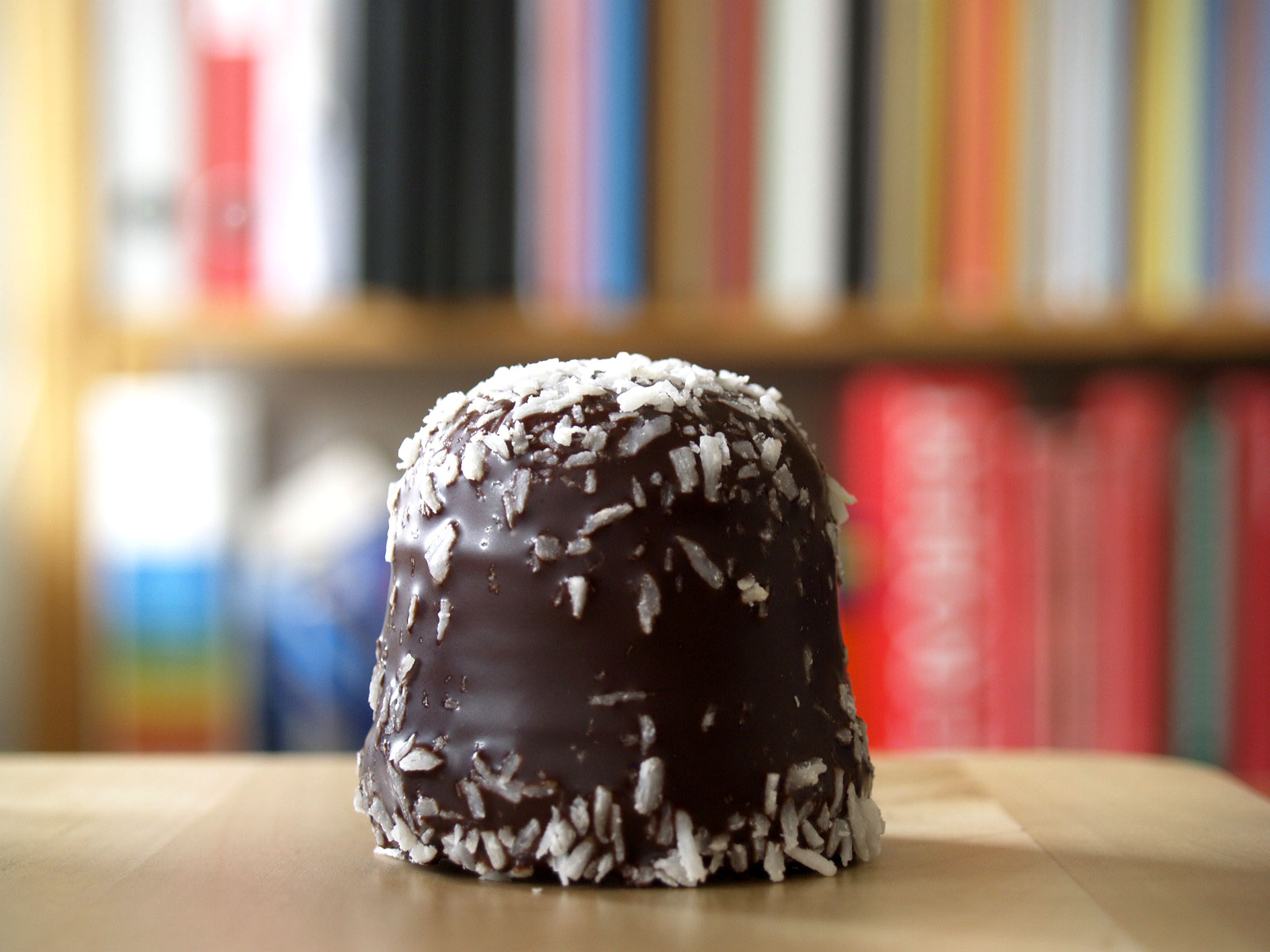
Flødebolle

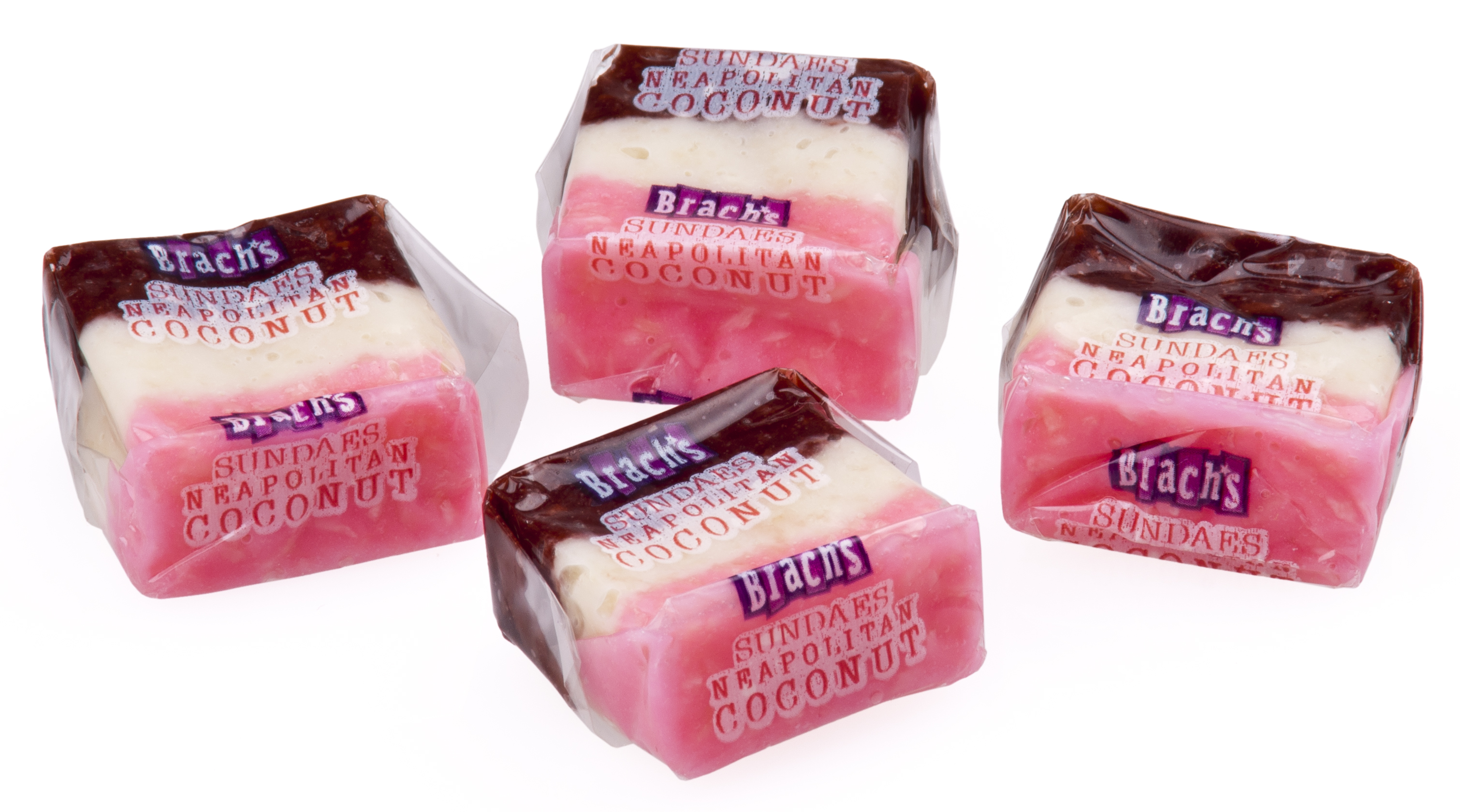
Neapolitan coconut candies

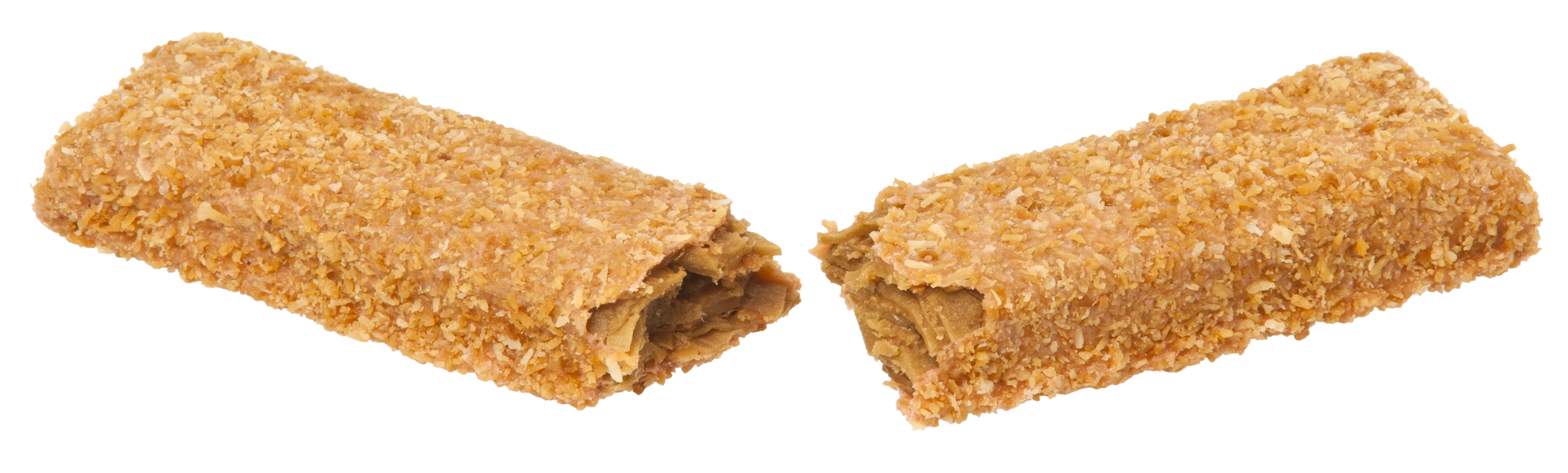
Zagnut

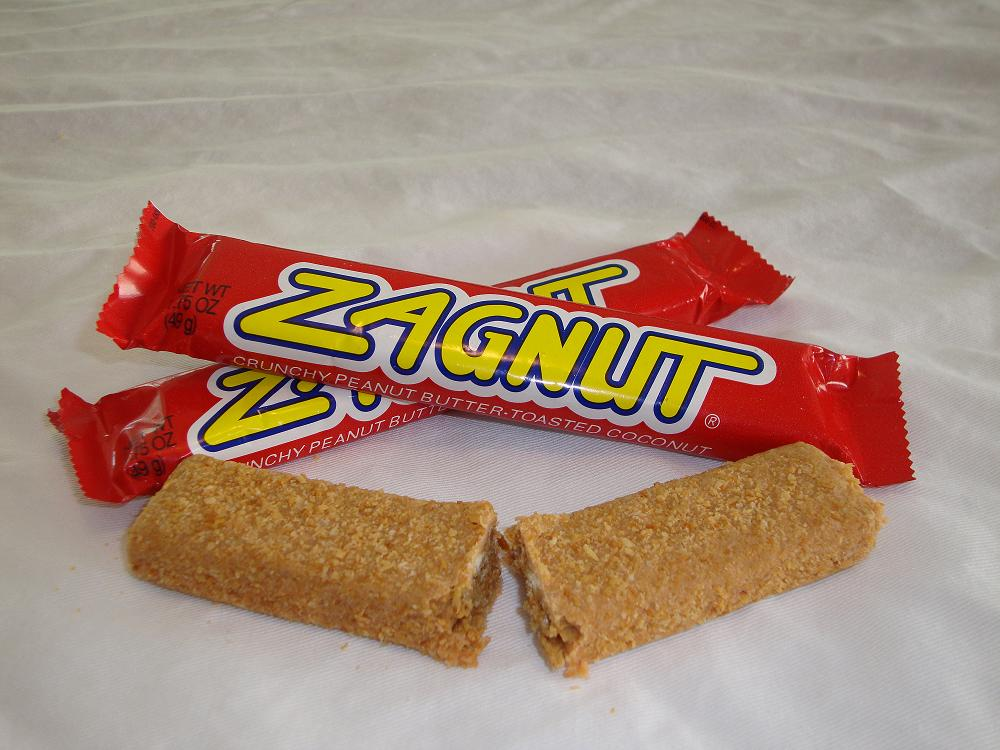
Zagnut

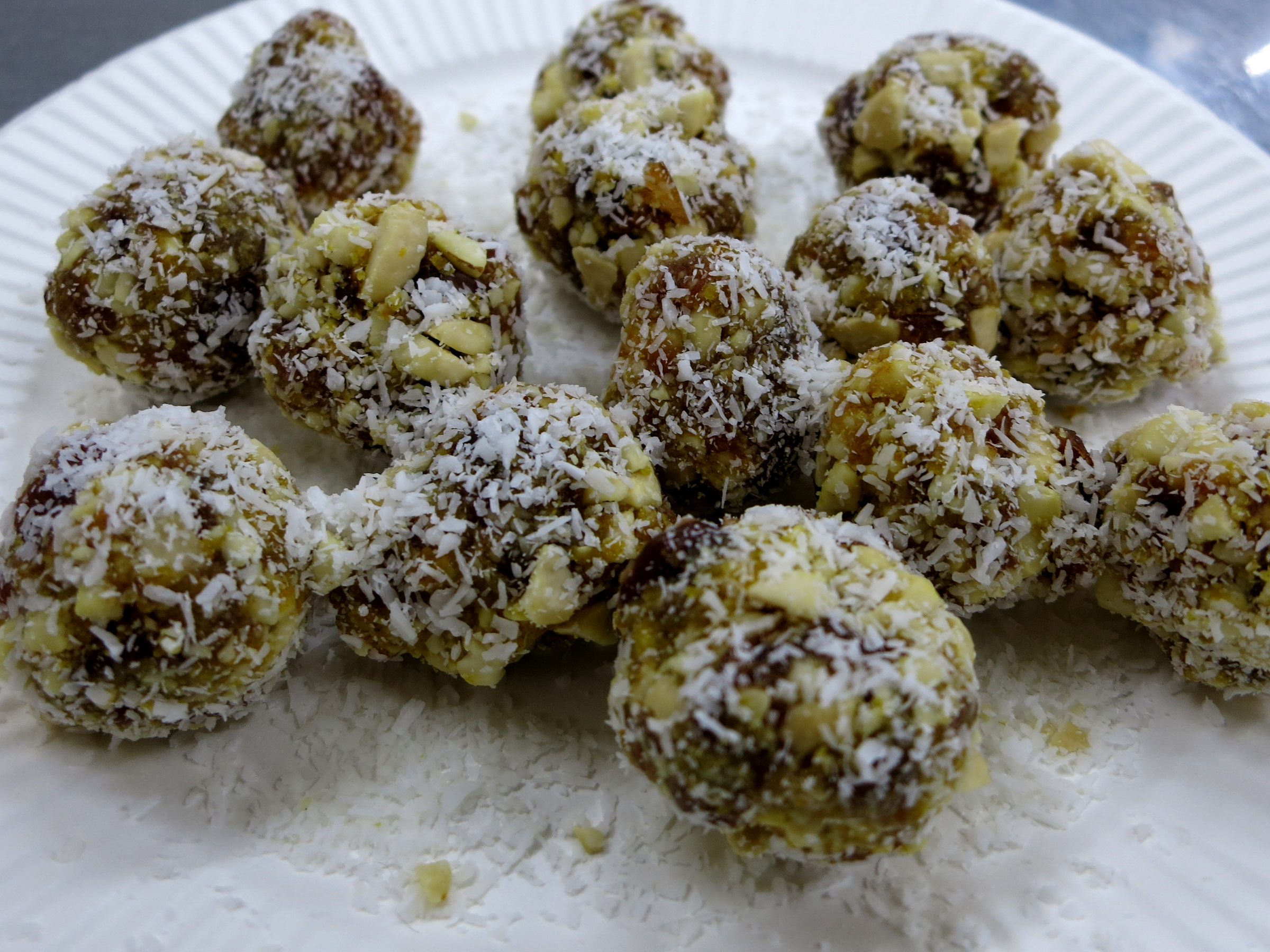
Cashew Balls

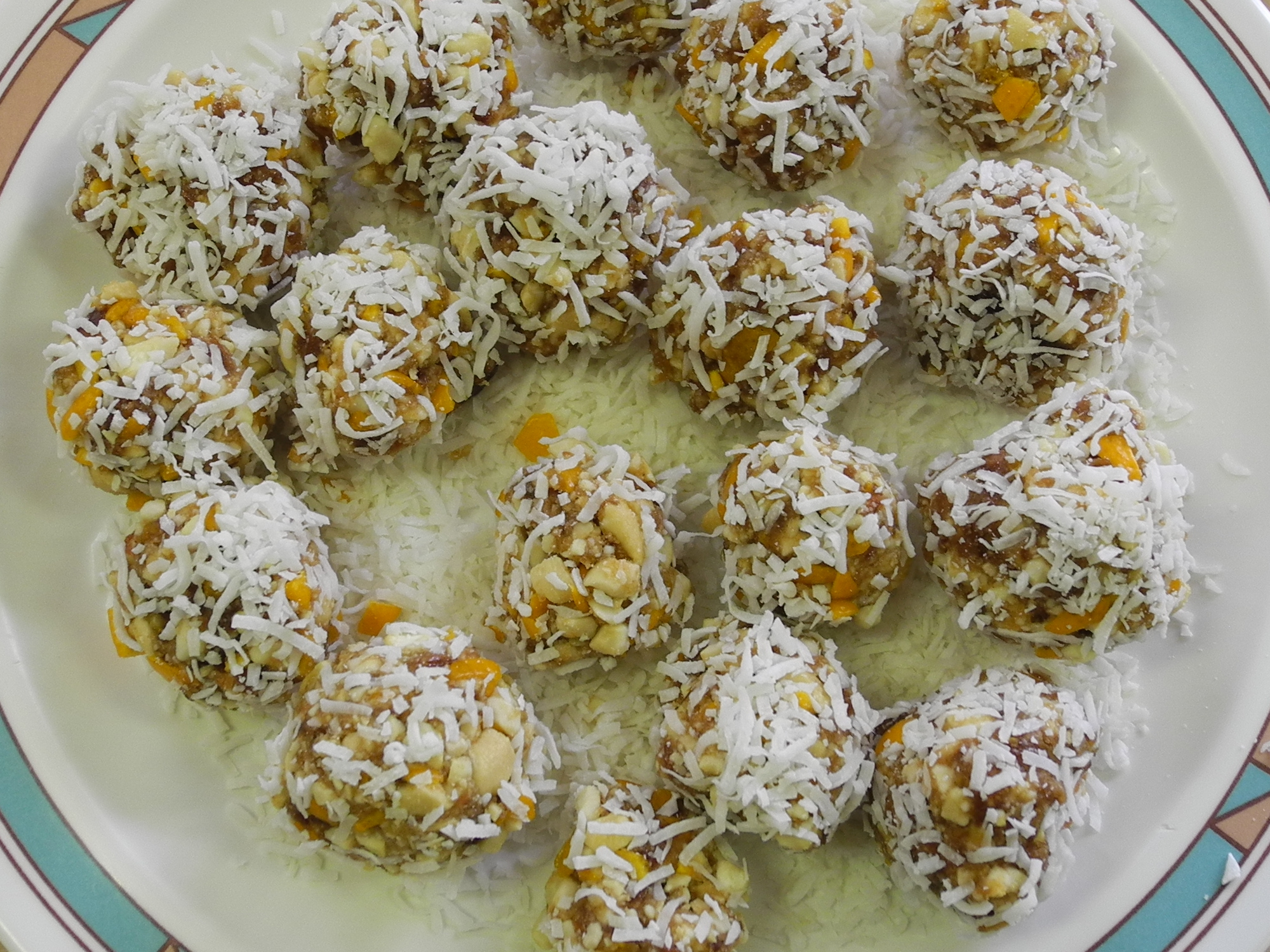
Cashew Balls

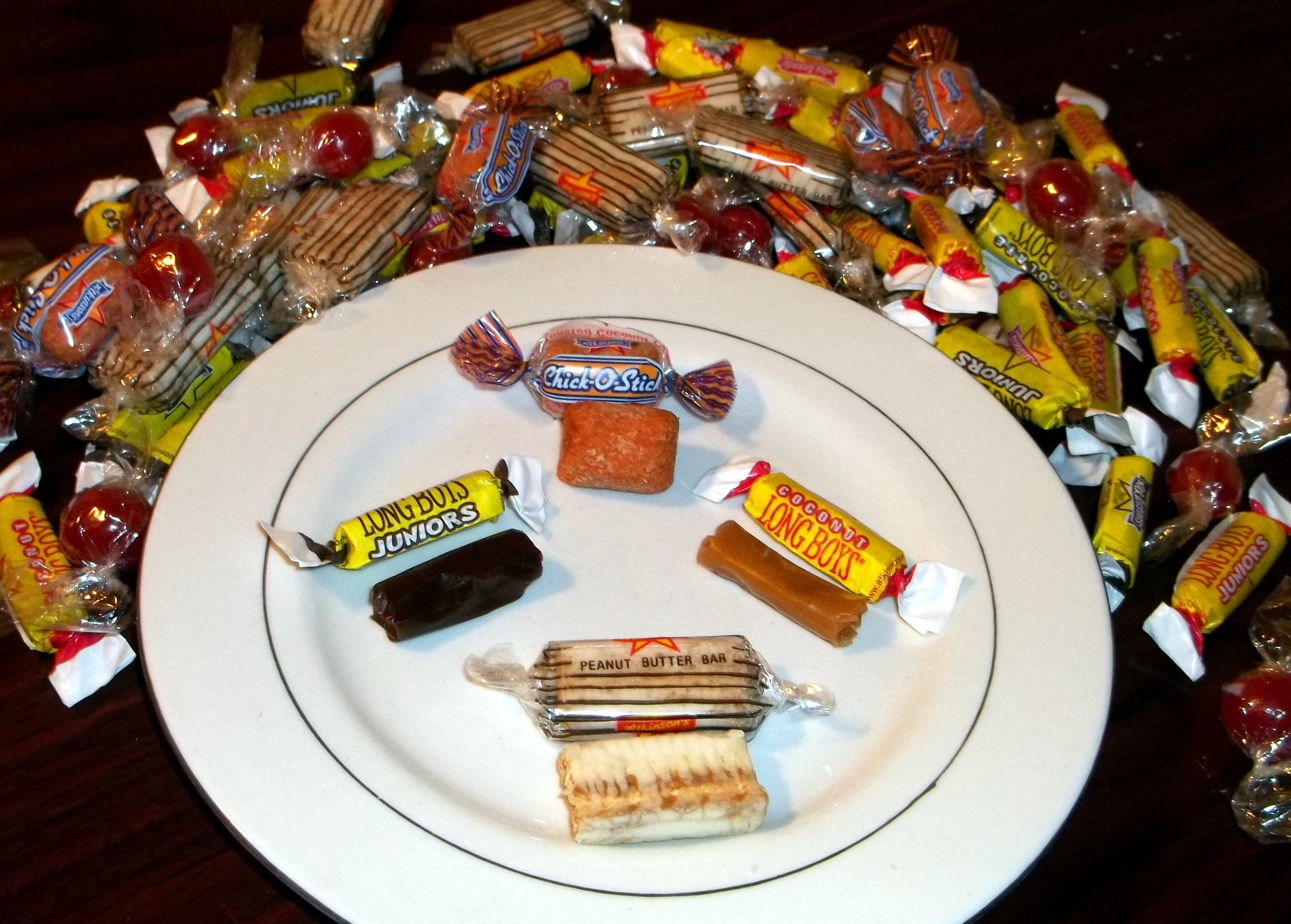
Atkinson Candy
