= Kẹo dừa =

Vietnamese coconut candy

Coconut candy
- Type: Confectionery
- Place of origin: Vietnam
- Region or state: Bến Tre Province
- Main ingredients: Coconut, malt syrup, sugar

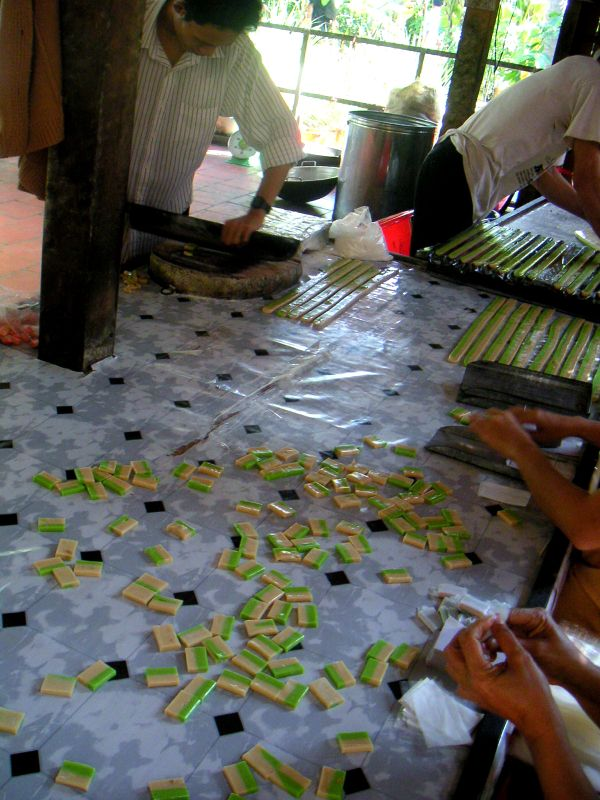
Traditional coconut candy making

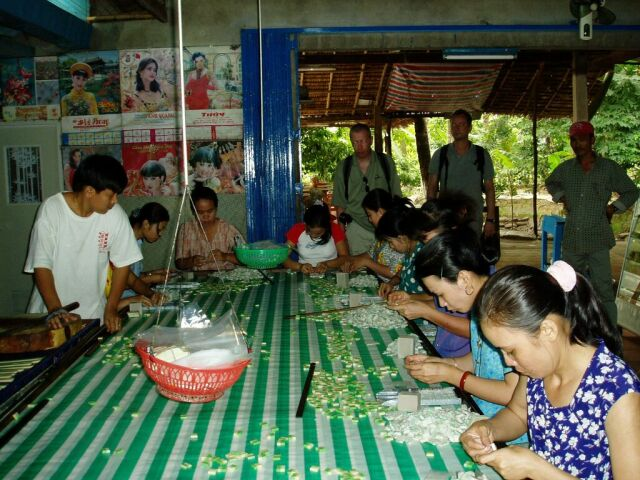

Kẹo dừa is a Vietnamese coconut candy most commonly produced in the old Bến Tre province (now Vĩnh Long province), Vietnam, with coconut milk and coconut cream. The Ben Tre Province is nicknamed by the Vietnamese as the "Land of Coconut" (Xứ Dừa). The Vietnamese term for coconut candy is "kẹo dừa", with kẹo = candy and dừa = coconut. Coconut candy was originally associated with Mỏ Cày, a commune within the Bến Tre province.

== Manufacturing process ==
The production of coconut candy starts with the grating of fresh coconut flesh. The grated flesh is then pressed to extract coconut milk and coconut cream. The next step is the addition of malt syrup and sugar to this mixture of coconut milk and cream. The ratio of the various ingredients is a closely guarded secret of individual coconut candy manufacturers. The mixing process is often entrusted only to the family members of the factory owner. Slight variations in the ingredient ratios can lead to very different texture and taste in the final product.

The mixture is then heated to a very high temperature in large woks over fires generated by the burning of coconut shells. While being heated, the mixture is stirred continuously to ensure even heat distribution. Traditionally, this stirring process was done manually with large wooden paddles. In larger modern manufacturing facilities, these paddles have been replaced by electric motors. The mixture eventually caramelises to a thicker texture. Recognising when the mixture has been cooked to the right level is more of an art than an exact science. While it is still hot and soft, the thickened mixture is then stringed out into moulds and allowed to cool. The final step sees the candy strings cut into rectangular lozenges, then wrapped and packaged.

Traditionally, coconut candy is wrapped in two layers of wrappings. The inner layer is edible rice paper, and the outer layer is paper soaked in vegetable oil. These measures were necessary to stop the candy from sticking to the paper wrapping. Larger manufacturers now use heat-sealed foil paper, which does not stick to the candy.

Kẹo dừa

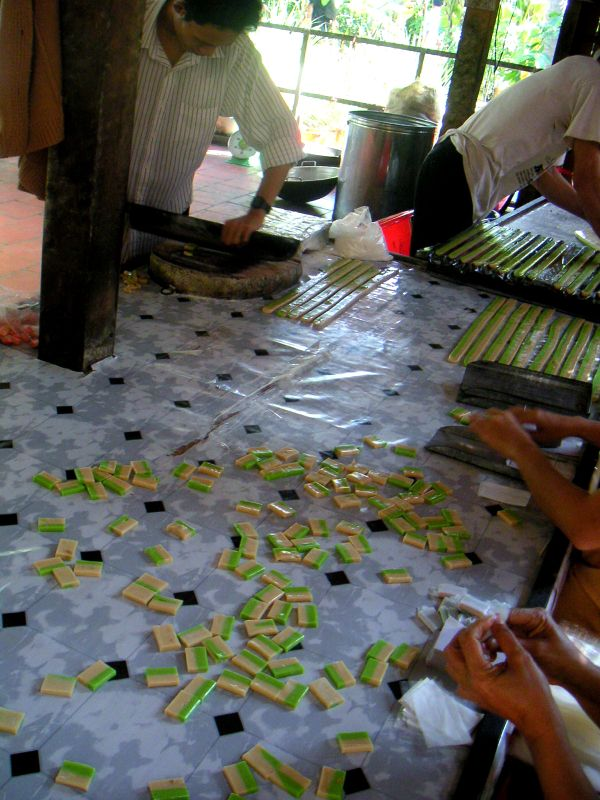

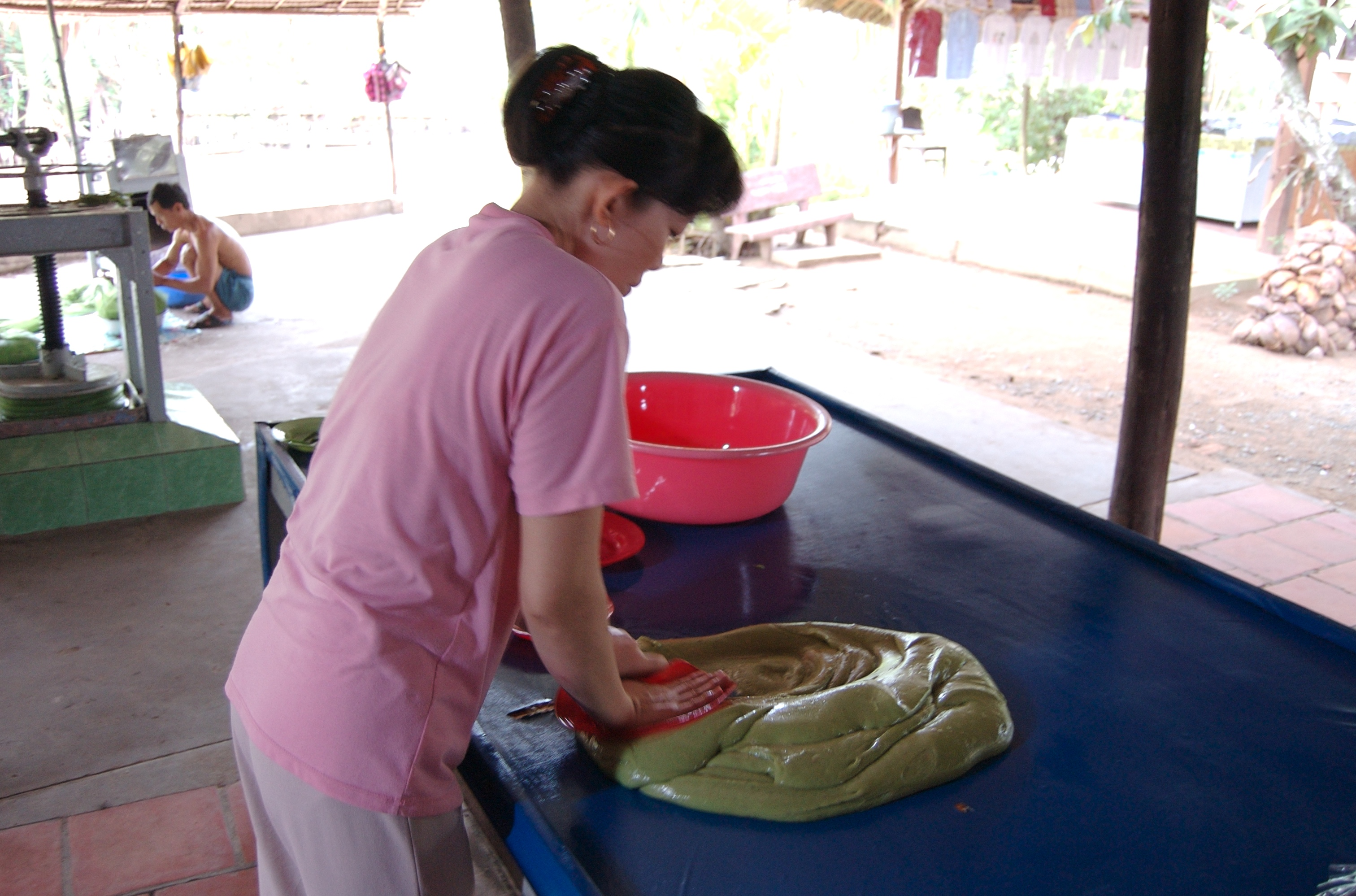

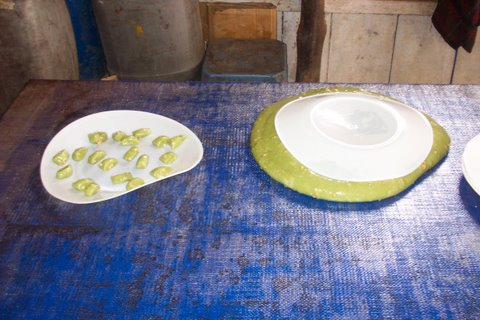

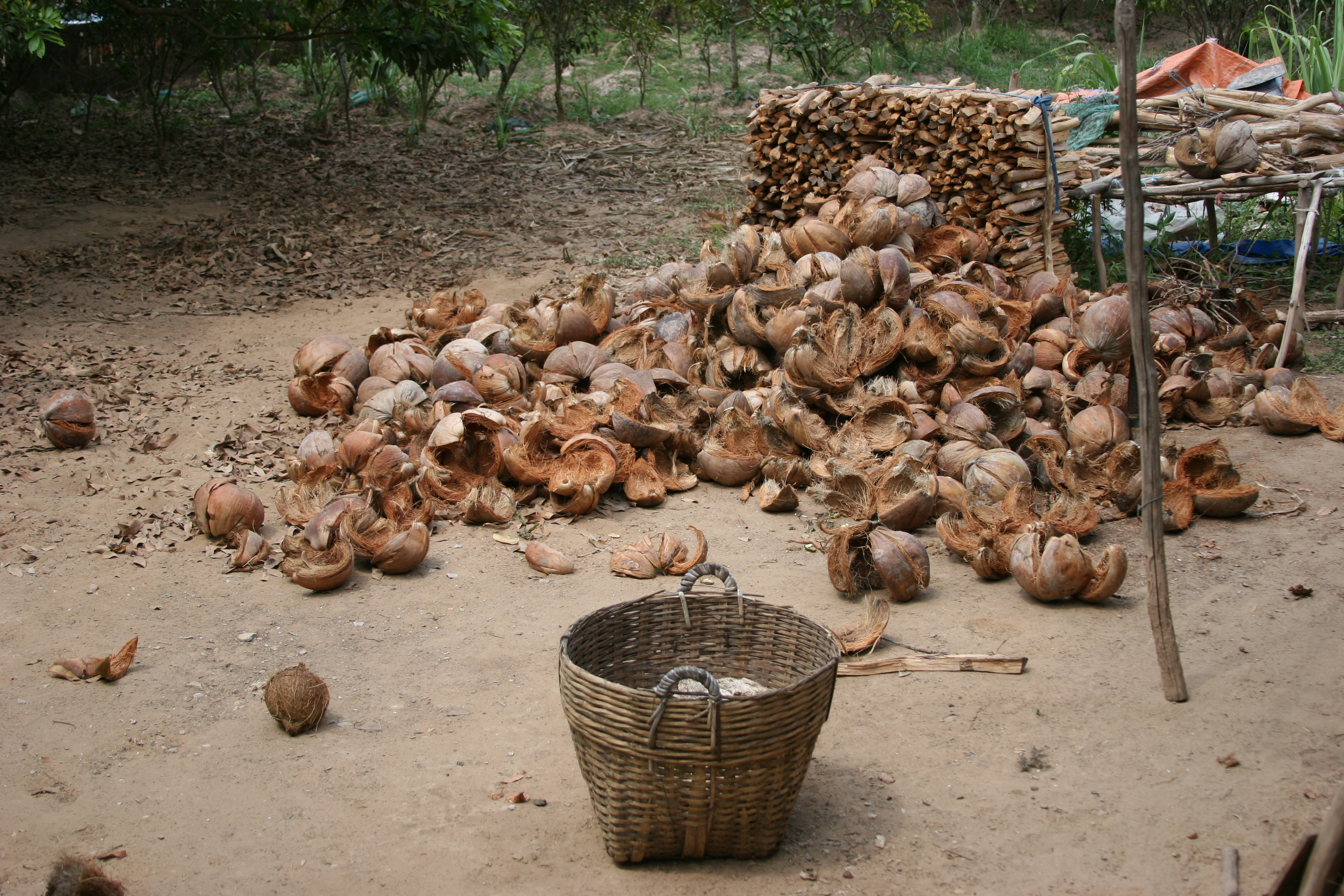
Cần xé

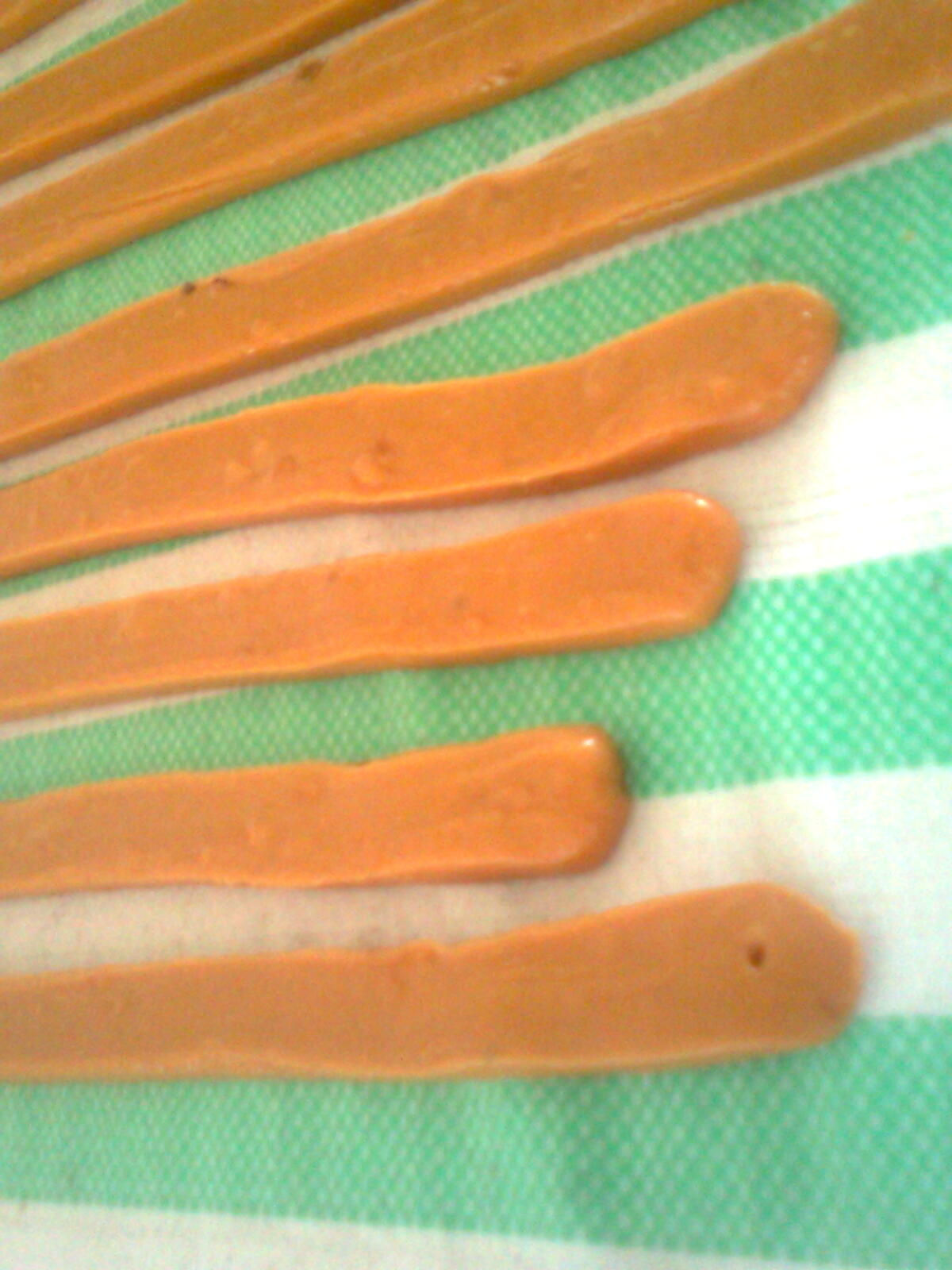

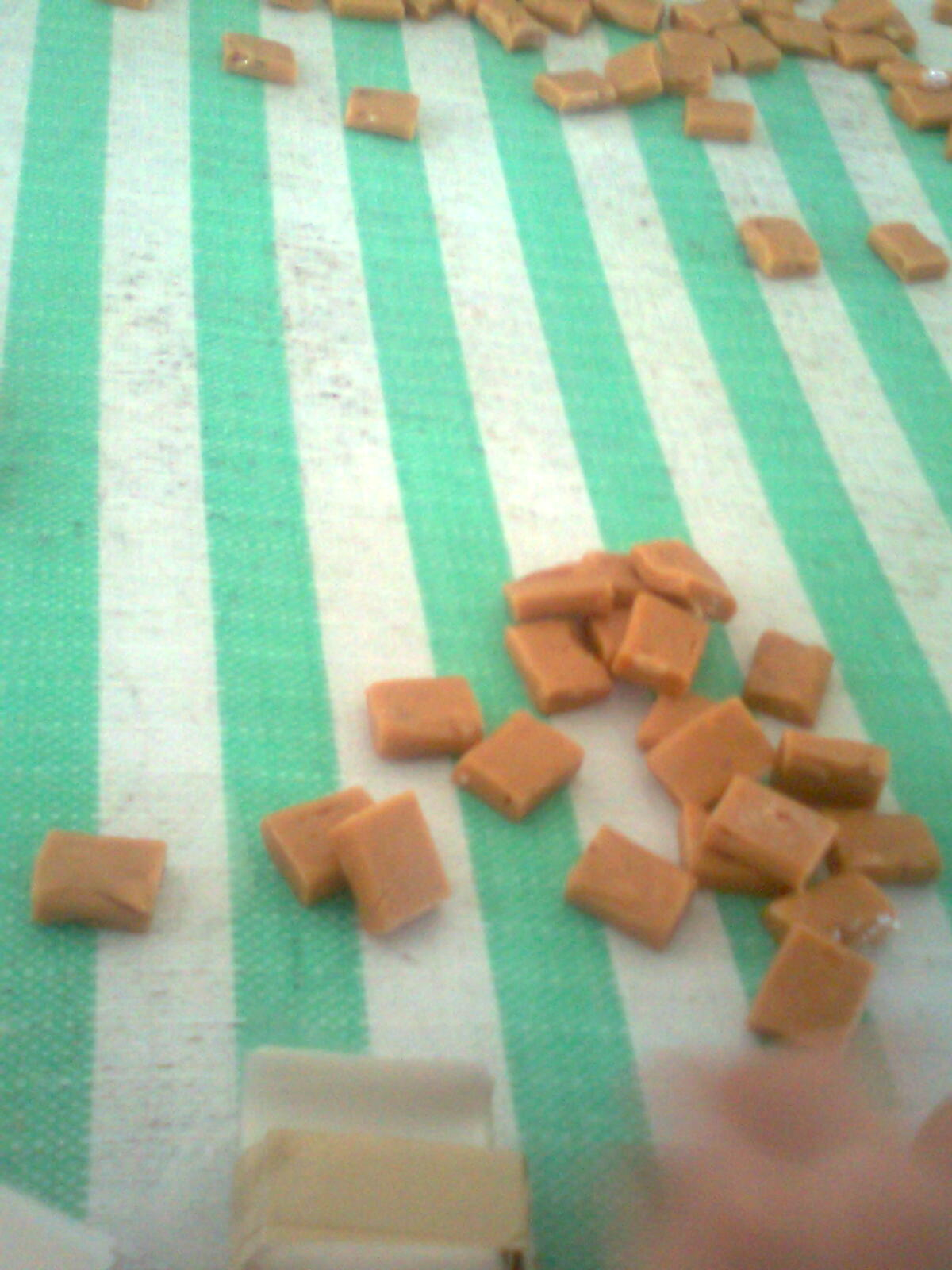

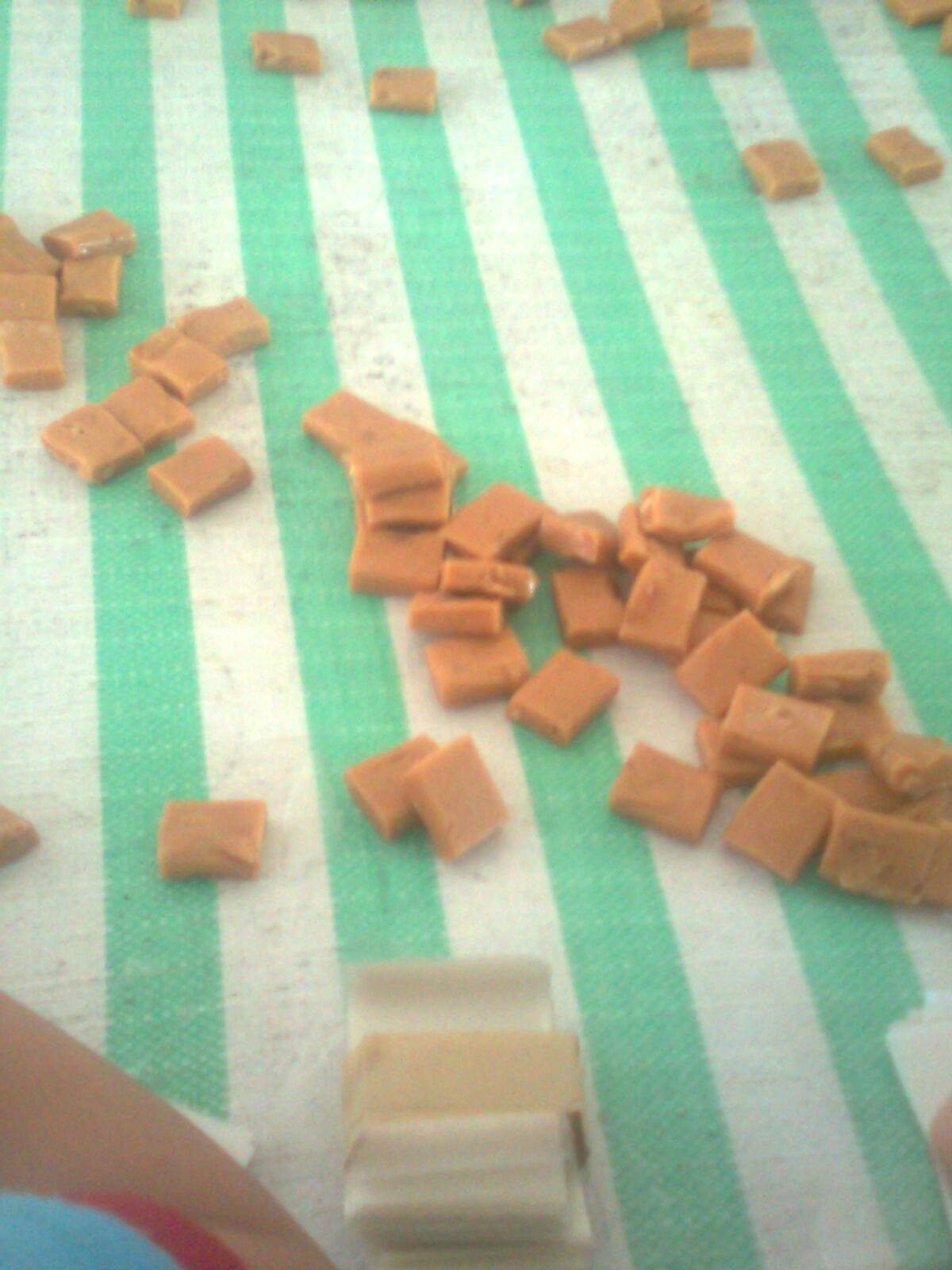

== Economic importance ==
Currently, Vĩnh Long province has over one hundred coconut candy manufacturers, making up thirty percent of local enterprises. However, the market is dominated by a handful of well-known brands, with most manufacturers producing candy under licence for these brands. Coconut candy is sold throughout Vietnam. It is also exported to other Asian countries, Australia, Europe and North America.
