= Coconut doughnut =

Type of doughnut in the United States and Canada

Coconut doughnuts
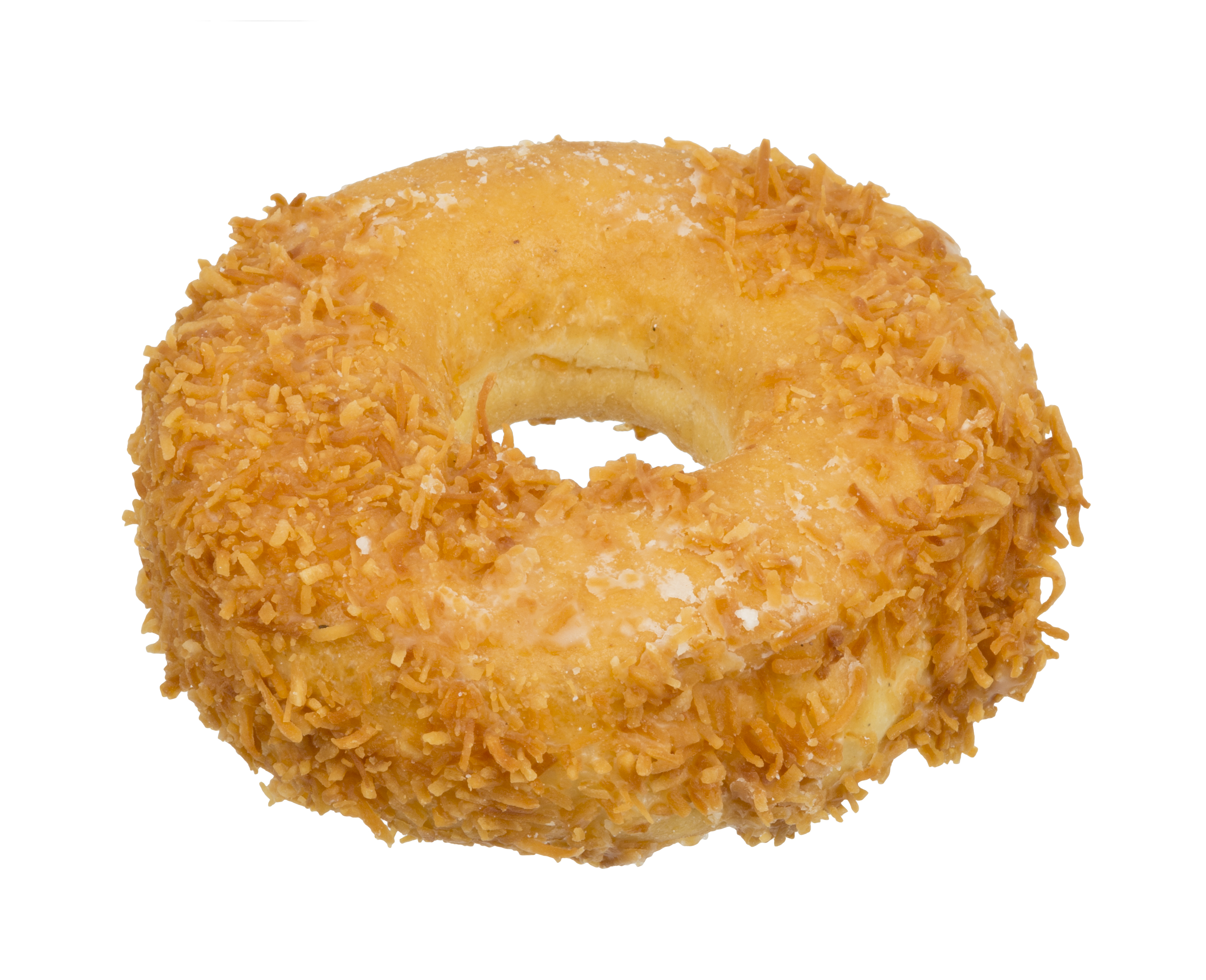
- A toasted coconut donut from Brooklyn, NY
- Place of origin: Canada, United States
- Serving temperature: Hot or cold
- Main ingredients: Doughnut, coconut
- Food energy (per serving): 340 (chocolate coconut doughnut)
- Other information: 3 g protein, 42 g carbohydrate, 18 g total fat (9 g saturated fat), 0 mg cholesterol, 400 g sodium (chocolate coconut doughnut)

The coconut doughnut (or coconut donut) is a variety of doughnut in the United States and Canada that is usually covered or topped with shredded or flaked coconut topping. It is often toasted or broiled, and there are variations made with chocolate and, in a 1959 recipe, orange juice in the dough and icing.

Coconut doughnuts are not usually filled, but there is an unrelated coconut doughnut that uses a coconut cream filling (like a Boston cream doughnut or jelly doughnuts).

== History ==
A 1946 recipe in the Chicago Tribune suggested coconut or chopped nuts as a doughnut topping. During a 1964 discussion of doughnut popularity and innovation (such as drive thru stores, the doughnut hole, and a handle to aid coffee dipping) advertising director Carl Zucher of the Mr. Donut company said a customer at a Florida drive-in feeds them to his horse, and especially the toasted coconut variety was the horse's favorite.

== Recognition ==
Andy Ward calls Dunkin' Donuts' toasted coconut variety "the greatest doughnut of them all" in an Esquire article. He describes it as being unusual and not well respected by food connoisseurs who have never tried it and associate it with being cheap and artery clogging, but credits the "marriage of textures" for making them "so perfect, they make me feel bad for Krispy Kreme.

A coconut doughnut from the Sugar Shack doughnut shop at a Shell station on U.S. 27 in Somerset, Kentucky, was determined to be one of the best doughnuts in the United States in 1999. The owners, Patrick and Audrey Godin, fell in love 27 years earlier while working at a Dunkin' Donuts in Nashua, New Hampshire, where 16-year-old Patrick became an apprentice baker. Doughnut connoisseurs have also praised the Toasted Coconut Donut at Dunkin' Donuts.

A coconut doughnut that is a "girly shade of pink" is a featured product of "cult" doughnut shop Top Pot Doughnuts in Seattle, Washington. It was one of the varieties included in a 2005 distribution agreement with Starbucks stores in Western Washington.

Conan O'Brien praised a coconut doughnut with a coconut cream filling as a "life-altering experience" during a three-day visit to Toronto in 2004, saying "it blew my mind".

== Gallery ==
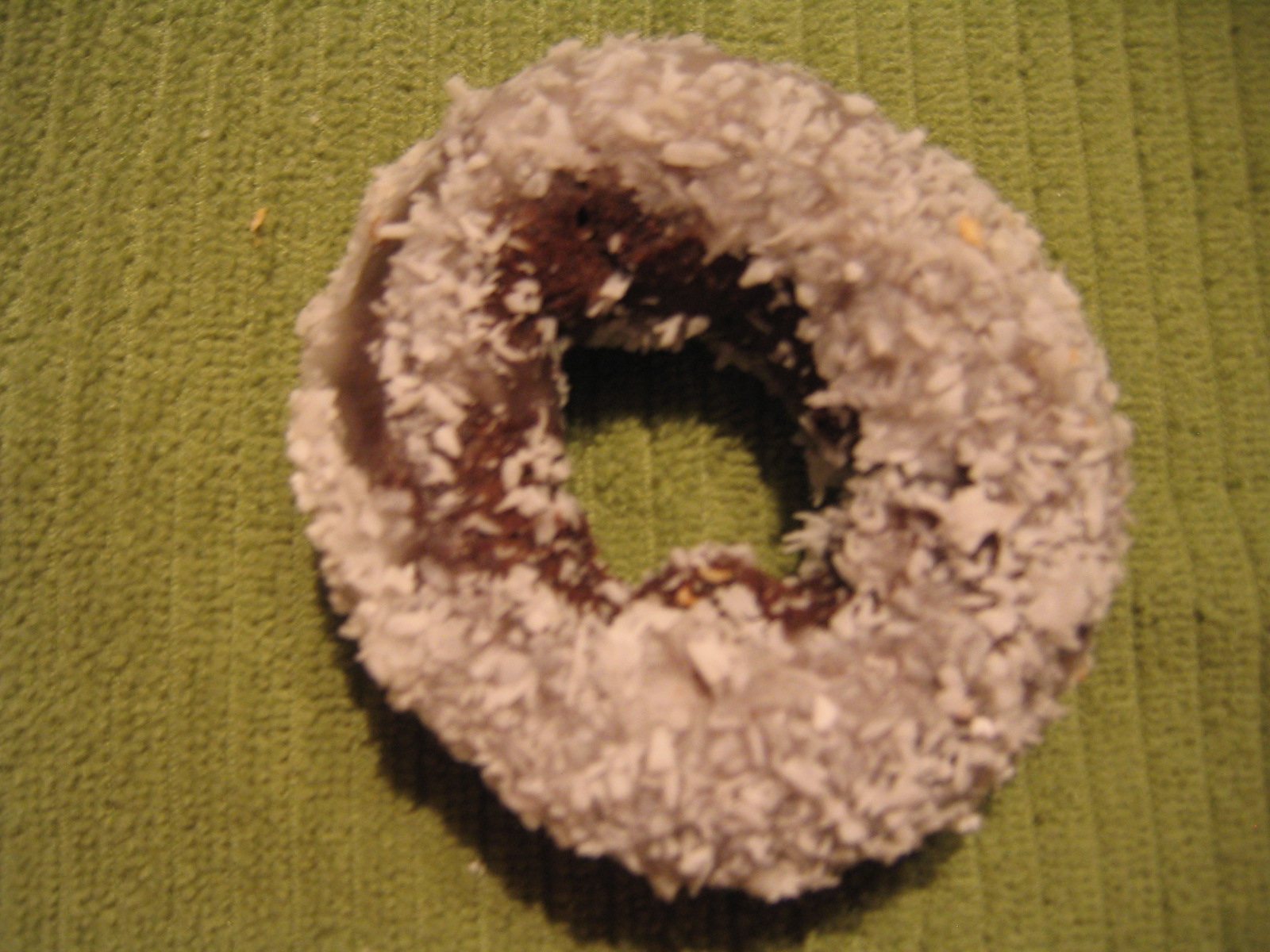
Chocolate white coconut

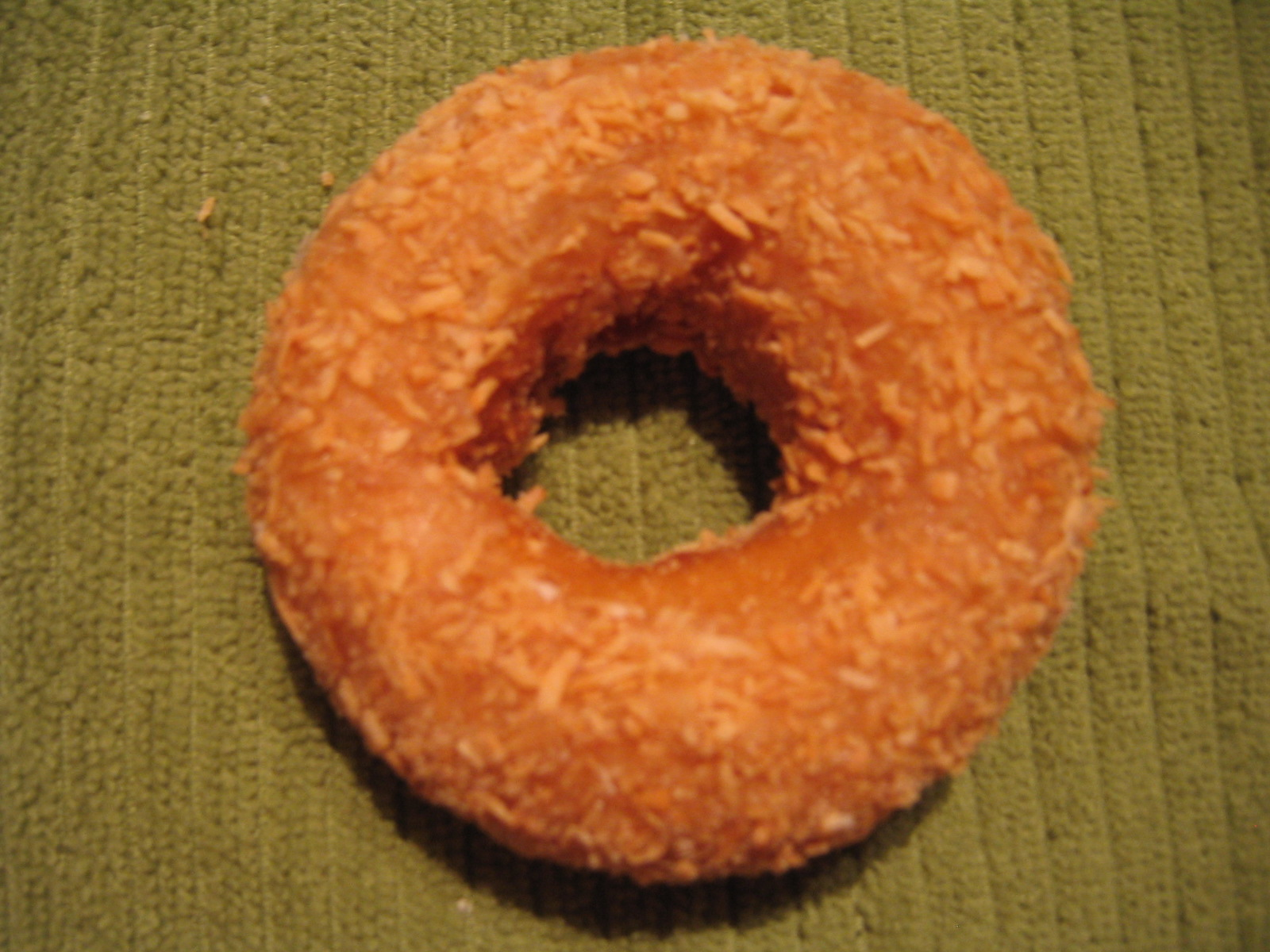
Toasted coconut

== See also ==
- List of doughnut varieties
- List of regional dishes of the United States
- List of fried dough varieties
- List of breakfast foods
