= Grater cake =

Coconut dessert

- Type: Dessert
- Place of origin: Jamaica
- Main ingredients: Coconut, sugar fondant

Grater cake is a dessert of grated coconut in a fondant of sugar in Jamaican cuisine. While refined, or white sugar, is now often used, when "wet" or "new" brown sugar was used, it was known as grater brute.

== See also ==
- Toto (dessert)
- Gizzada
- List of Jamaican dishes
