= Gizzada =

Tart with coconut filling

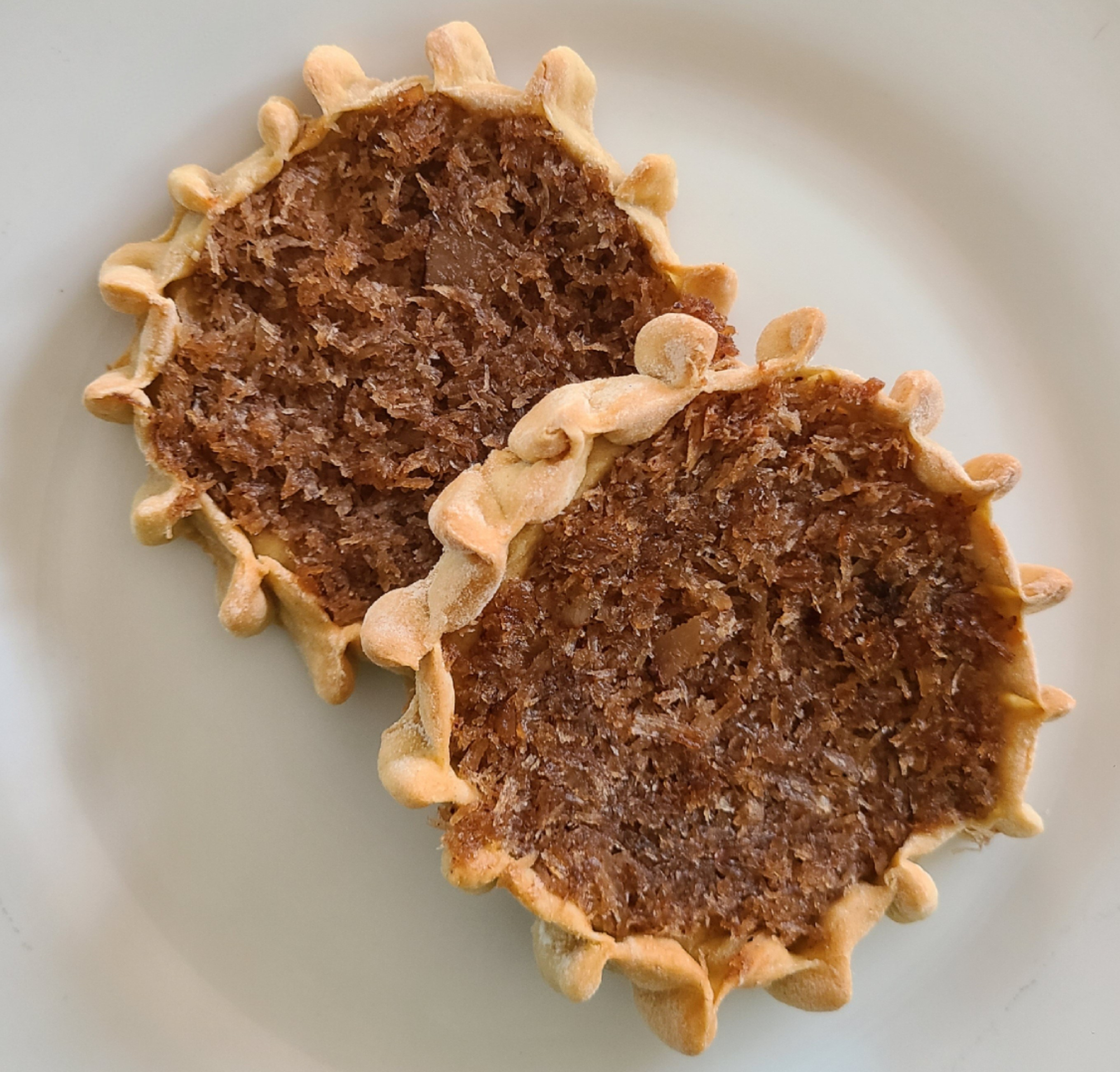
- Jamaican Gizzadas
- Alternative names: Guizada, pinch-me-round
- Type: Tart
- Place of origin: Jamaica
- Created by: Portuguese Jews
- Main ingredients: Coconut, sugar, nutmeg, vanilla, flour and butter

Gizzada, also referred to as pinch-me-round, is a classic traditional pastry in Jamaican cuisine. The tart is contained in a small, crisp pastry shell with a pinched crust and filled with a sweet and spiced coconut filling. It bears semblance to Portuguese queijada.

== History ==
=== Origin ===
Gizzada is a coconut tart with Portuguese roots, which originated in Jamaica. Its origins trace back to the period of Spanish colonization in the 16th century, as well as British rule in the 17th century. The pastry was contributed by Portuguese Jews who sought refuge in Jamaica from 1530, fleeing religious persecution during the Inquisition.

=== Etymology ===
The name "gizzada" derived from the Portuguese word "guisada" (pronounced /ɡi'zada/) and Spanish "guisado", meaning “stewed or stew”, which reflects the spiced coconut mixture that is stewed to make the pastry's filling.

"Pinch-me-round" refers to the traditional technique of pinching or crimping the edges of the pastry crust.

== Description ==
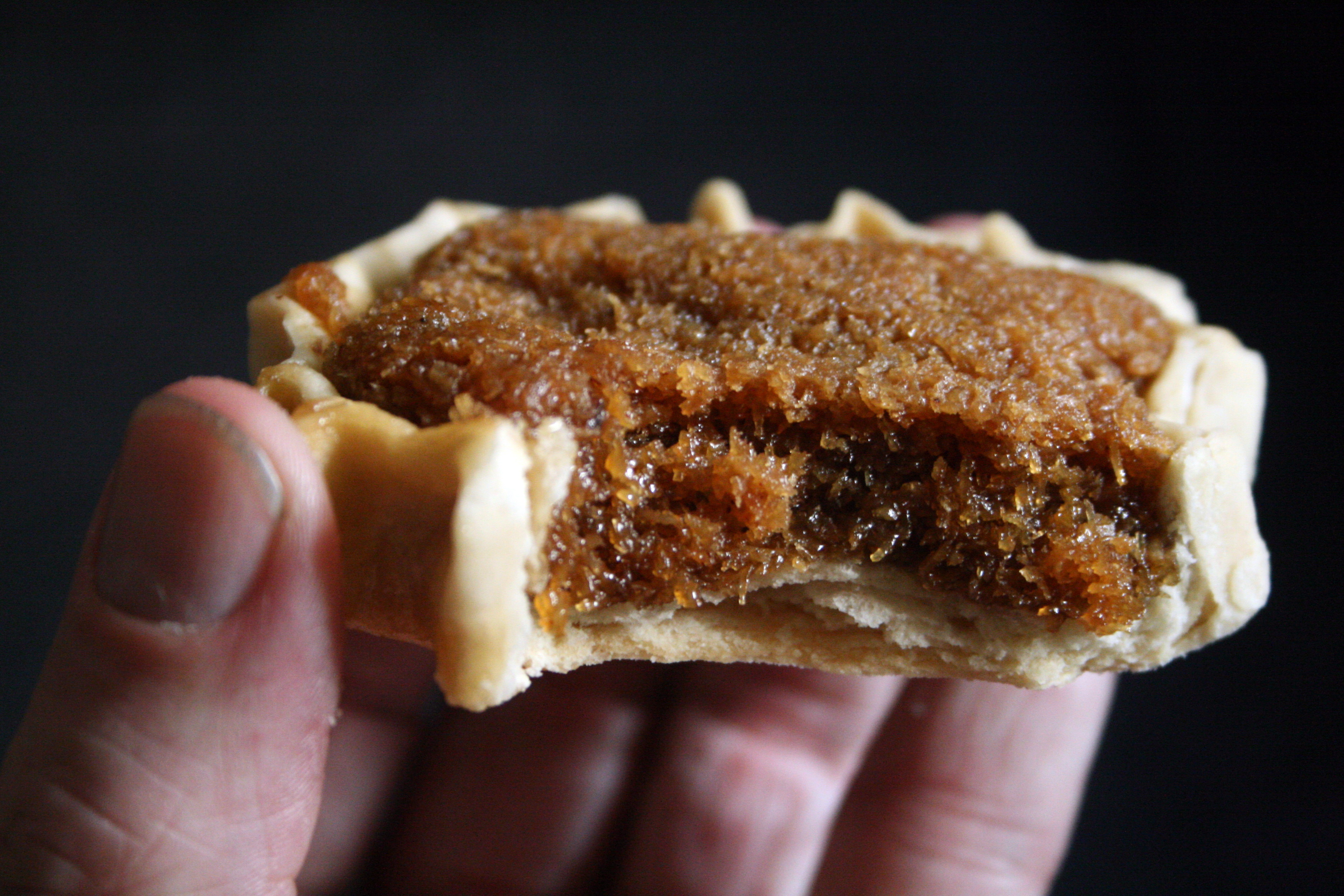
Jamaican gizzada from the 2007 West Indian Day Parade in Brooklyn, New York

Gizzada is a handmade sweet treat, which is typically eaten as a snack or dessert. One of its most distinct characteristics is the crimped pastry shell, carefully pinched into a unique star-like shape. The crust is made from flour, salt, sugar, cold butter or margarine, shortening and water, which are gently mixed to form a pastry dough. A rolling pin is used to flatten the dough, which is cut into small or 3-4" circles, before the edges are pinched and the filling is added to the center. The filling is made from grated coconut, brown sugar, ginger, nutmeg, cinnamon and vanilla, which are stewed together in a pot and then cooled before filling the shells and baking.

It is commonly sold on the streets, buses, in supermarkets, pastry shops, airports, hotels, schools and at local events. It became popular due to its affordabilty, especially in rural communities where coconuts were abundant. Gizzada is often taken abroad by Jamaican travellers, and may be sold at restaurants and events abroad, particularly in areas with a sizeable Caribbean diaspora.

== See also ==
- Grater cake – a Jamaican dessert of grated coconut in a fondant of sugar
- Toto – a small Jamaican coconut cake
- Jamaican cuisine
- List of Jamaican dishes
