= Sauerkraut candy =

Coconut fudge dessert

Sauerkraut candy is a type of coconut fudge dessert in the United States. It looks like sauerkraut and is made with shreds of grated coconut in "tawny sugary fudge". It is made with milk, brown sugar, butter, vanilla and grated coconut. Coconut fudges came to be referred to as sauerkraut candy, perhaps because the same cutters used to shred cabbage for sauerkraut were used.
