= Mampostial =

Puerto Rican dessert

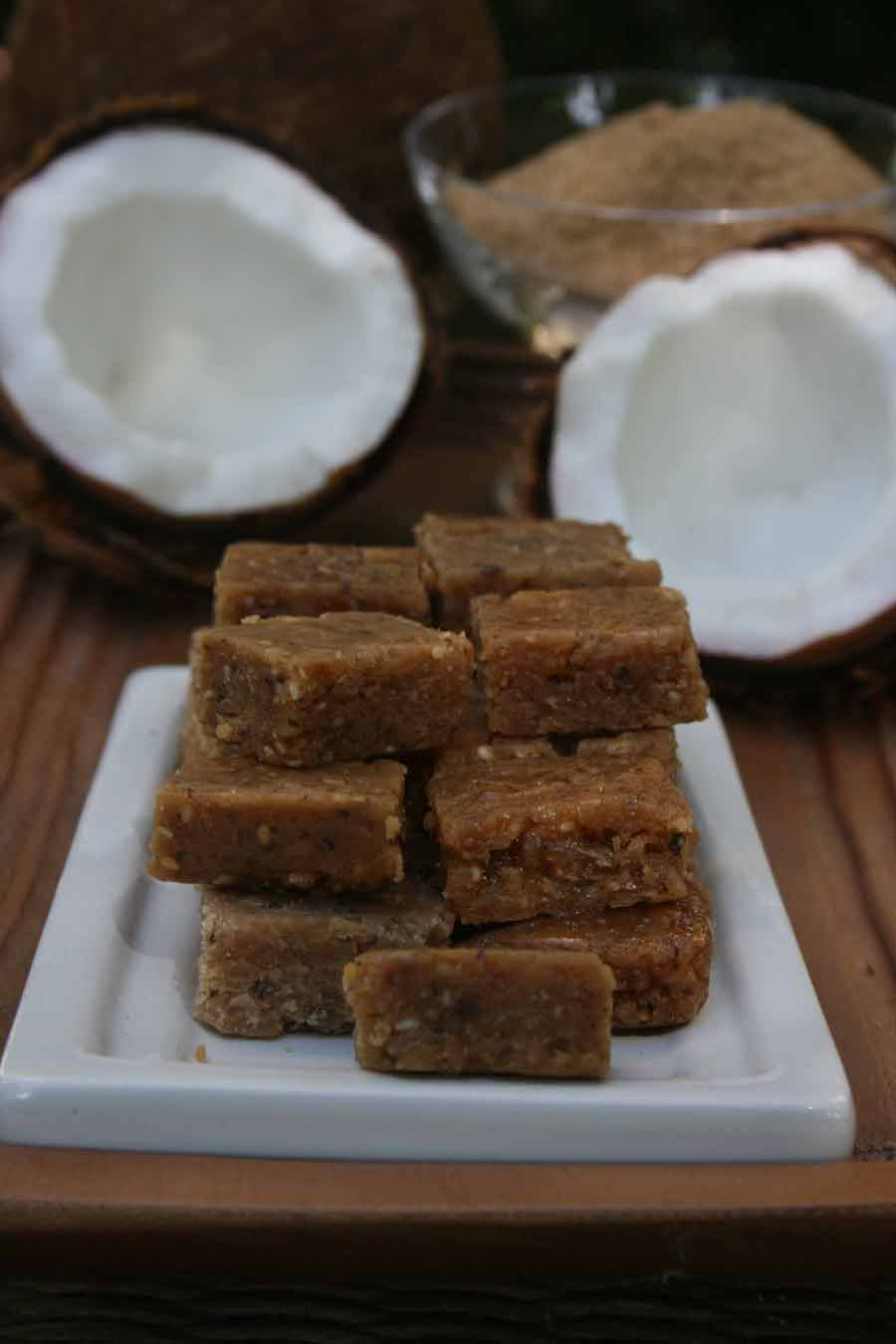
Mampostial with sesame seeds

Mampostial, also referred to as Marrallo, is a shredded coconut, toasted sesame seed, molasses, cinnamon, sweetened with either honey or brown cane sugar candy in Puerto Rican cuisine cooked over medium heat and prepared into a dessert. It can also have additional vanilla, nuts, or fruit such as pineapple, orange, mango, or guava. Mampostial can also be used as a empanada or pie filling and baked.
