= Toto (dessert) =

Jamaican cake made with coconut milk

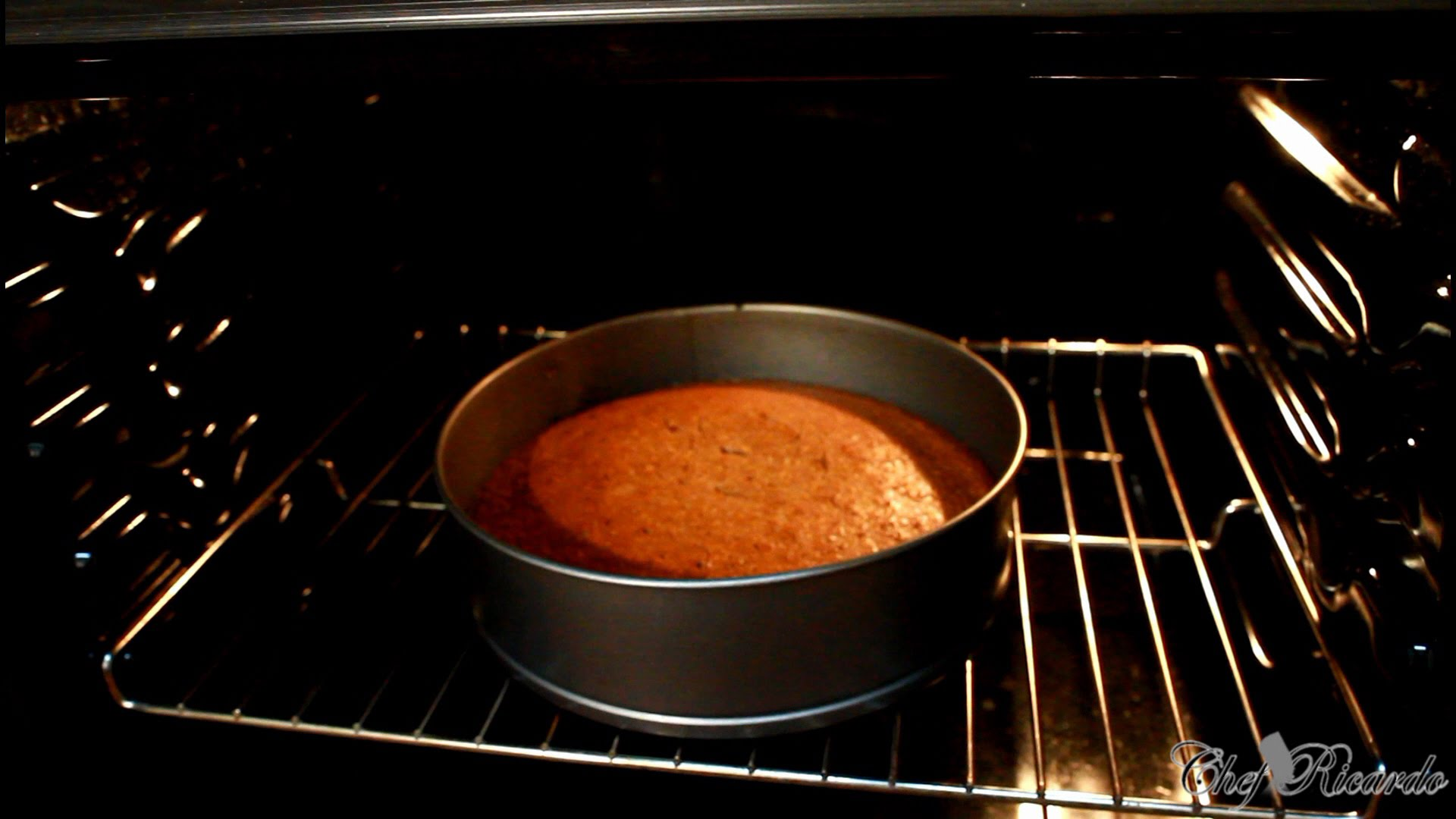
- Toto cake being baked
- Alternative names: tuoto and toe-toe bulla
- Type: Cake
- Place of origin: Jamaica
- Main ingredients: Coconut, sugar, flour

Toto (also referred to as tuoto and toe-toe bulla) is a small coconut cake in Jamaican cuisine served as a snack or dessert, typically prepared with shredded coconut, brown sugar, flour, baking soda and powder, and coconut milk. It may also be added with some flavourings such as allspice, nutmeg, ginger, and salt. Toto is a Jamaican delicacy that is served at most family gatherings, Sunday dinners, and various celebrations.

== Origin and history ==
The cake is a Jamaican speciality dessert with origins from the period of its colonial slavery; it draws on both African and British culinary traditions and is a staple in home baking. Whenever the slaves were hungry from being underfed, they would combine coconut, molasses and flour, bake it with fire coals laced on top of a metal sheet covering the cake pan and fire beneath the cake pan.

== Preparation ==
It is commonly served after the Sunday meal dinner with homemade ice cream. The cake is being prepared by mixing all the necessary ingredients with cinnamon, butter and raisin also being used together with main ingredients such as brown sugar, coconut, flour, baking soda and powder, as well as coconut milk, and baked for around 25–30 minutes, where it can be either served slightly warm or completely cooled.

== Misconceptions ==
It was stated in the book Jamaican food: history, biology, culture, published in 2008, that the food appears to have been invented in the twentieth century, and that by the end of the twentieth century they were difficult to find. That claim may be erroneous as the food is typically made in homes and not sold widely in stores. Toto recipes are passed down within families, some claiming to have recipes from the 19th century. Toto is not related to coco bread, although it is sometimes called with the latter name, either toto or coconut bread or buns, within the country. The latter is another iconic Jamaican staple, described in the 1950s as a "baked dumpling" made by folding dough to create a soft, buttery bread.

== See also ==
- Gizzada
- Grater cake
- List of cakes
- List of Jamaican dishes
