= Coconut soup =

Soup prepared using coconut as a main ingredient

Coconut soup is a fruit soup prepared using coconut milk or coconut fruit as a main ingredient. Many varieties of coconut soups exist in the world, including ginataan, laksa, sayur lodeh, soto, and tom kha kai, and myriad ingredients are used. They can be served hot or cold. While most coconut soups are savoury dishes, some varieties—such as binignit and kolak—are sweet dessert soups.

== Overview ==
Coconut soup is a fruit soup prepared using coconut fruit or coconut milk as a primary ingredient. It can be prepared as a broth-based or cream-based soup. The coconut fruit can be sliced, chopped, or shredded. Green coconut fruit from young coconuts can also be used to prepare coconut soup, and coconut water and coconut oil are sometimes used as ingredients. Many various coconut soups exist in the world, with myriad ingredients used. Coconut soup is sometimes prepared in combinations using other ingredients, such as chicken, potato, or curry. It can be served as a hot or cold soup.

== By country and region ==
=== Caribbean ===
Sopito is a common fish soup or fish chowder in Aruba and Curaçao of the Lesser Antilles. The dish uses coconut milk and salt-cured meat as main ingredients. (Note: "... sopito (a fish chowder that owes its special flavor to coconut milk — in addition to fish, salt pork or corned ...") Coconut water is also often used to prepare sopito. Sopita de pisca is a variation that uses tomatoes. Coconut and chayote soup is consumed in some areas of the Caribbean.

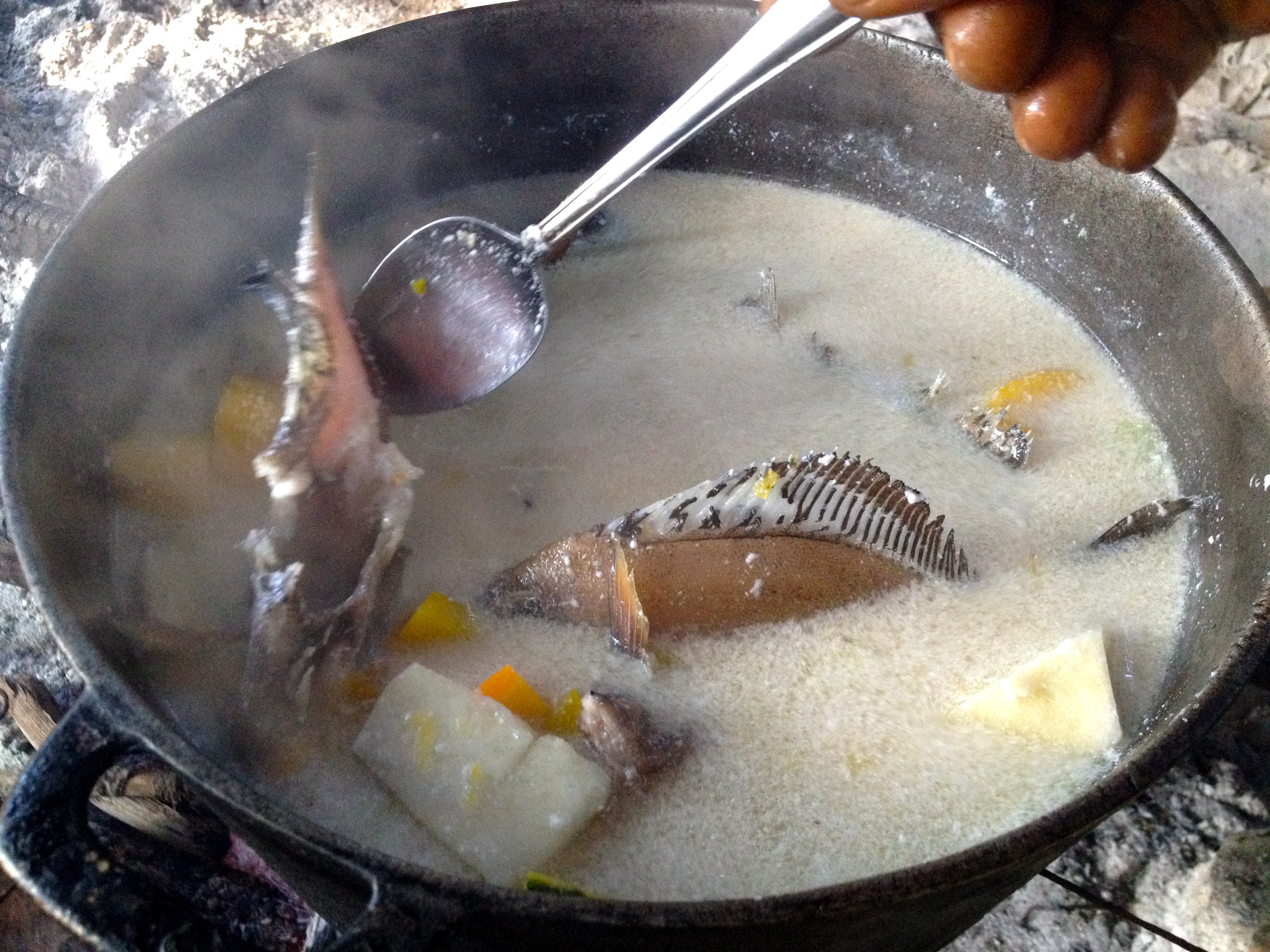
Jamaican fish and coconut milk soup

=== China ===
Sago soup is a Chinese dessert soup prepared using sago starch, which is derived from sago palm pith, coconut milk, and other ingredients. Sago is similar to tapioca, and is produced in pearl form.

=== Indonesia ===
Some varieties of soto, an Indonesian soup, are prepared using coconut milk, such as soto ayam and soto betawi. Several Indonesian soups also use coconut milk, such as lontong cap go meh, ketupat sayur, opor and sayur lodeh, a vegetable soup in coconut milk.

Palembang's mie celor is noodles in shrimp and coconut soup, while laksan is slices of pempek fish surimi served in coconut-based laksa soup.

Sweet coconut soup dessert includes kolak and cendol, popular for iftar during Ramadan. (Note: "Notably, the kolak is served almost exclusively during Ramadan, and can thus be said to be a ritual drink; however, there are ...") (Note: "Ask around for cendol Temburong – a special provincial brew available only around Ramadan. ")

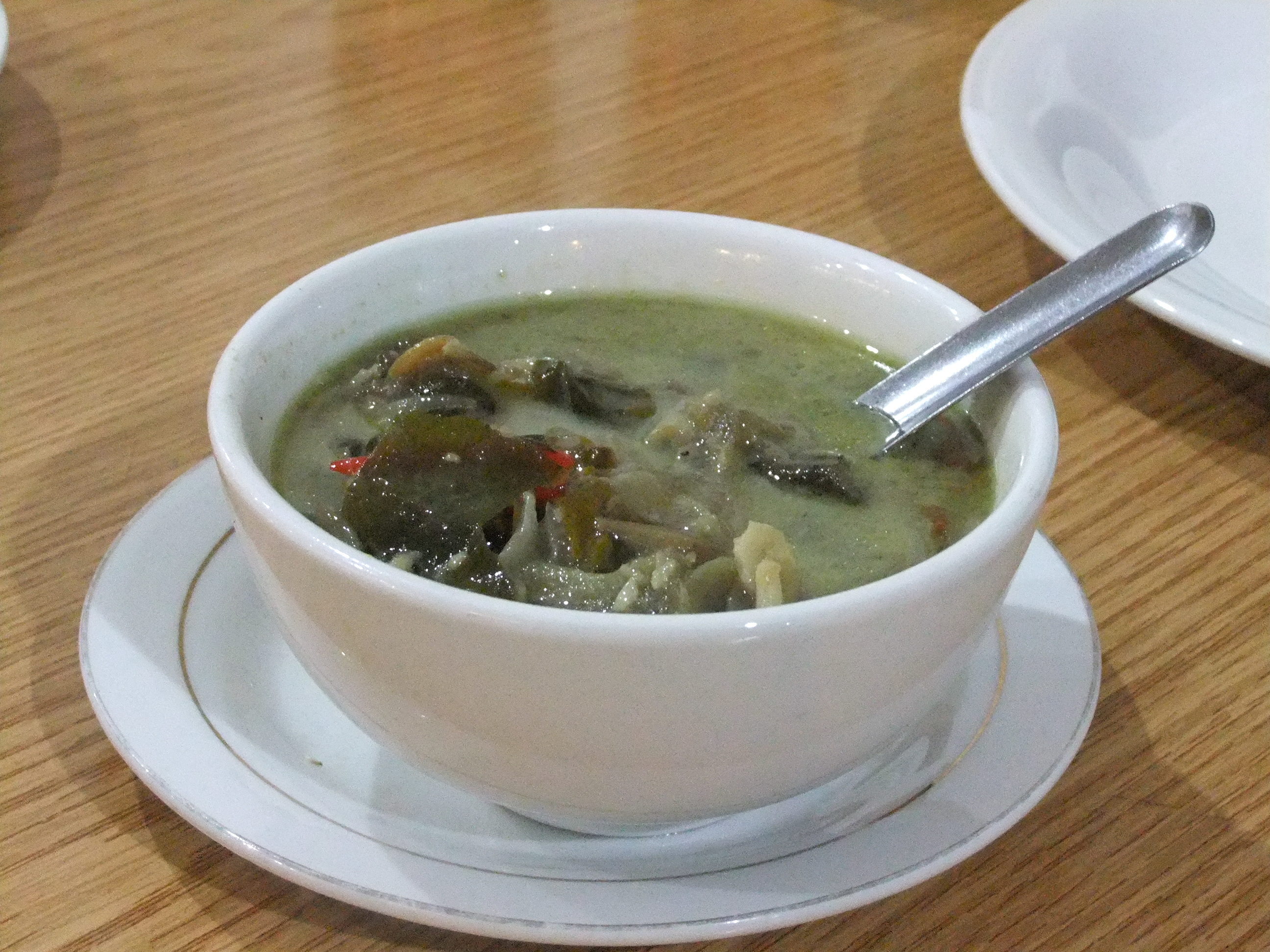
Sayur lodeh

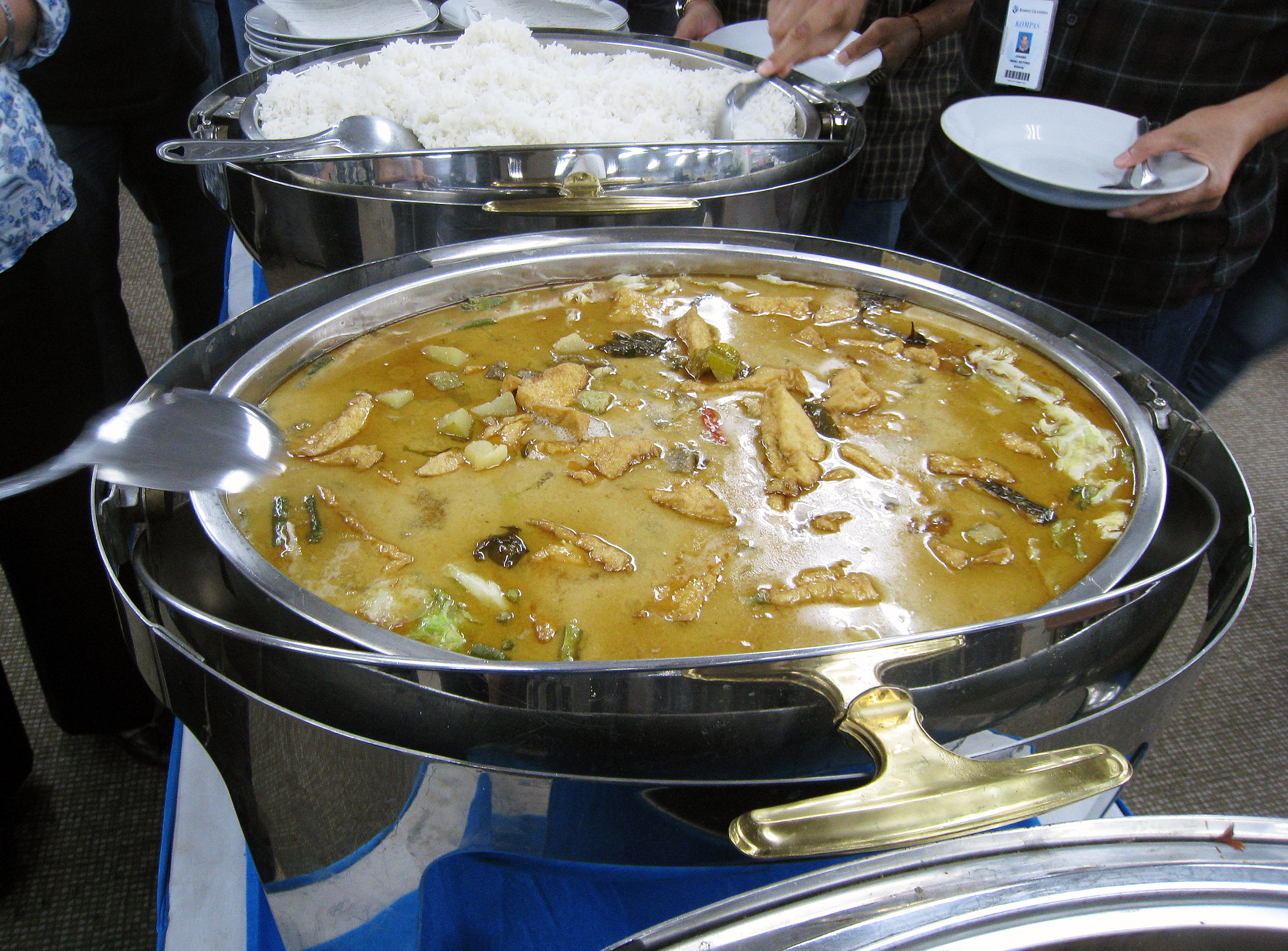
Sayur lodeh

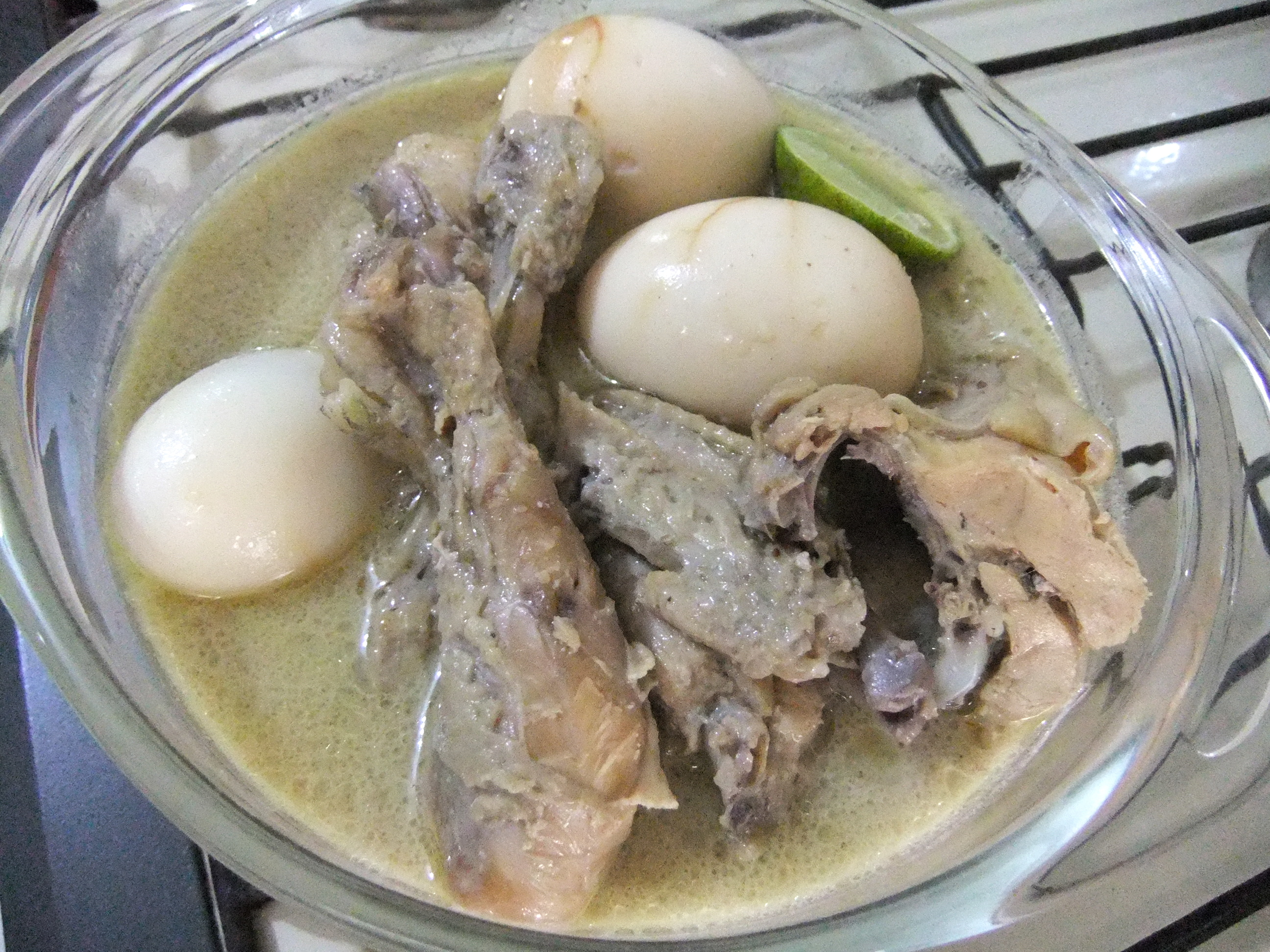
Opor ayam

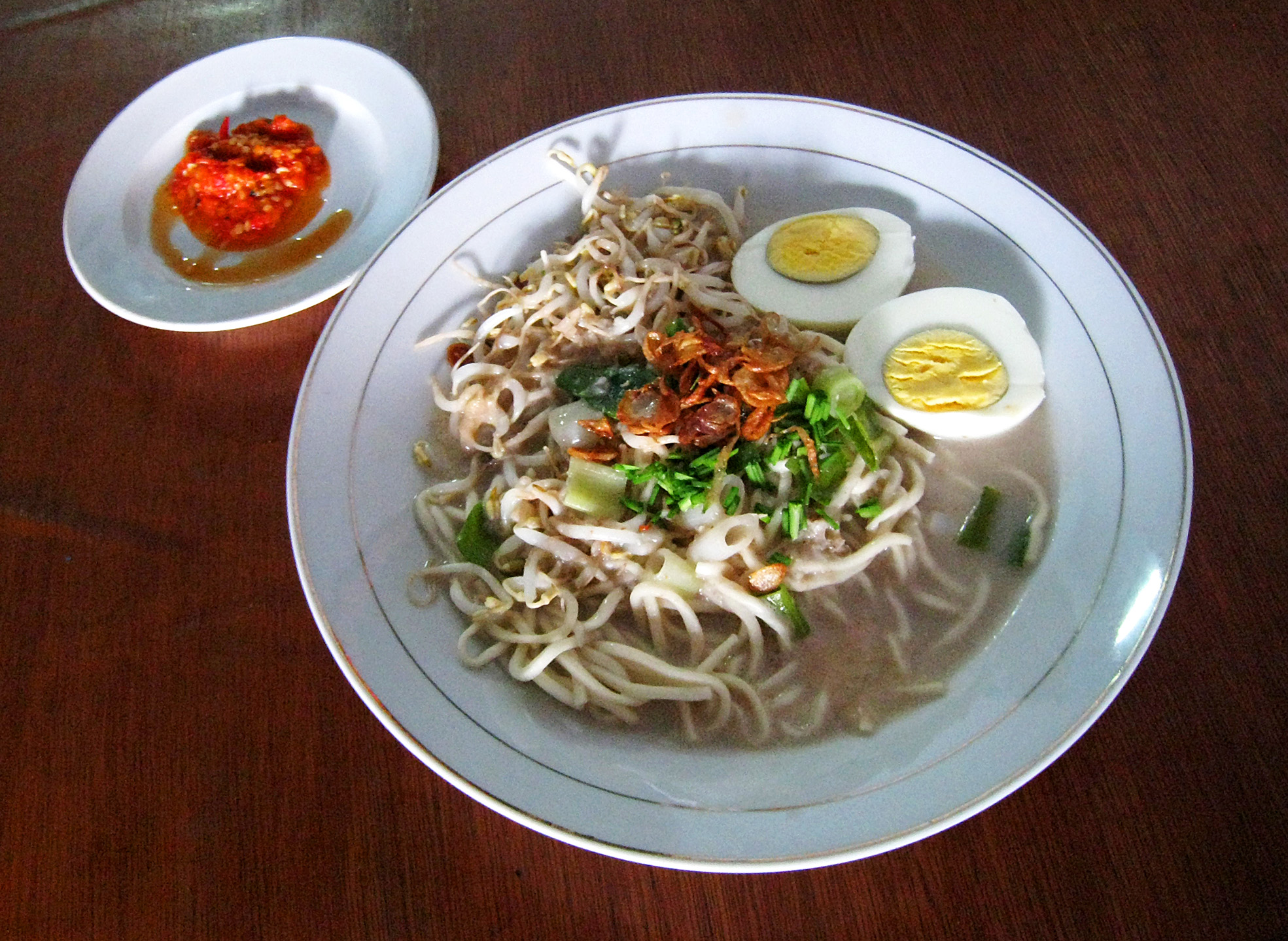
Mie celor

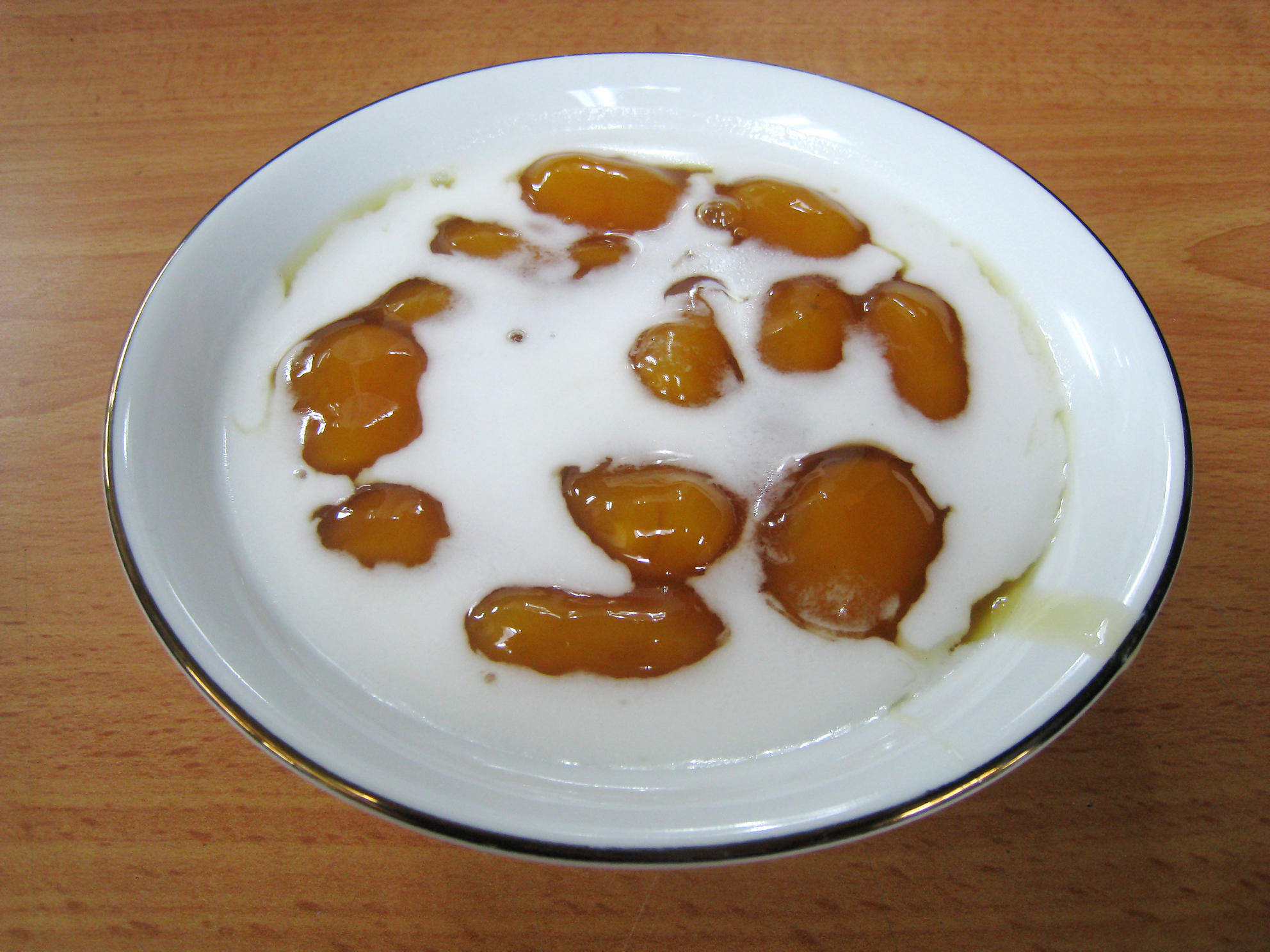
Kolak

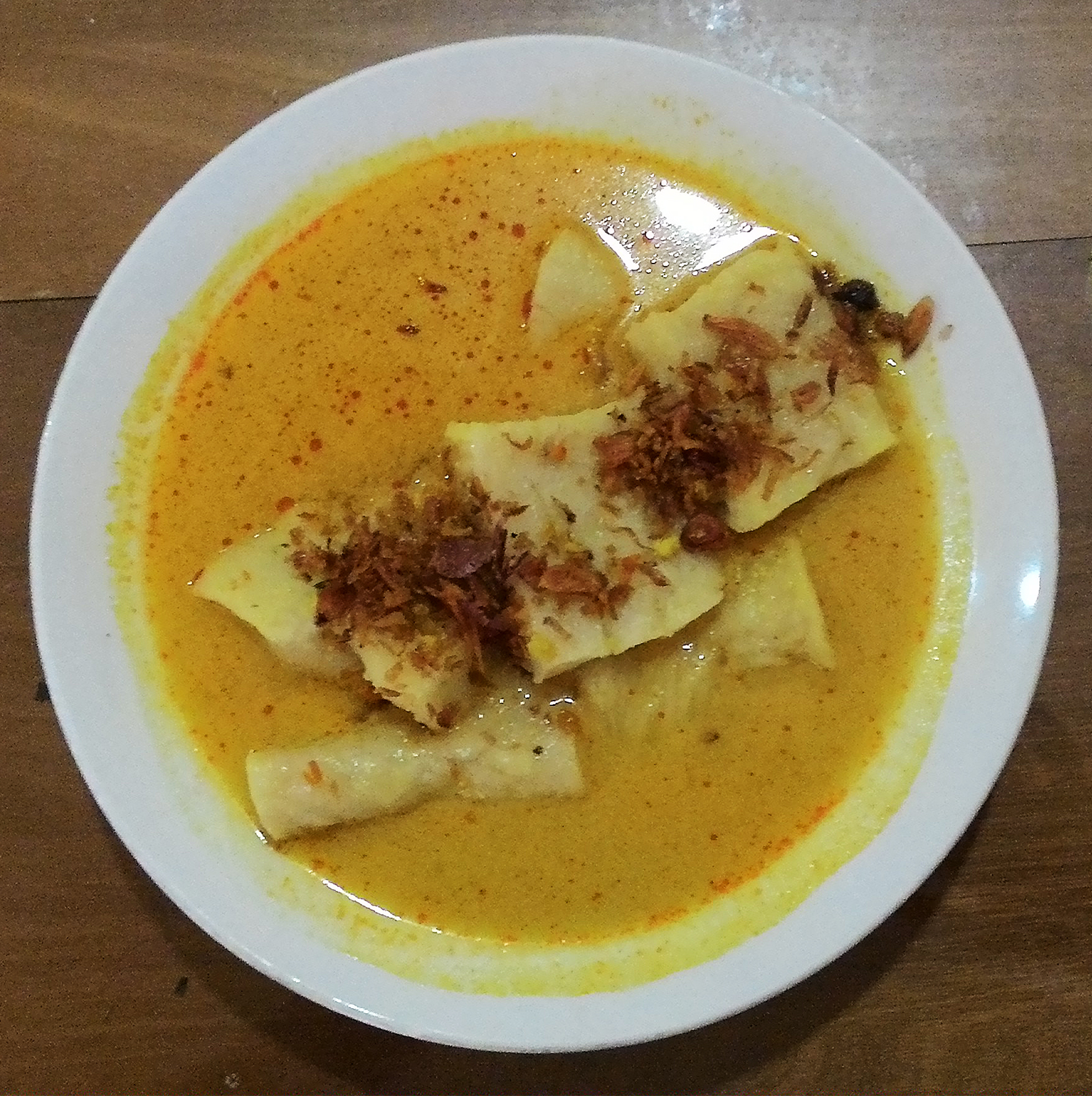
Laksan Palembang

=== Laos ===
Tom kha kai is a popular dish in Laos.

=== Malaysia and Singapore ===
Laksa is a popular noodle dish with many diverse variants, many of which are prepared with coconut milk, noodles, spices, and meats such as chicken, fish, or shrimp. Tofu and vegetables are also sometimes used as ingredients.

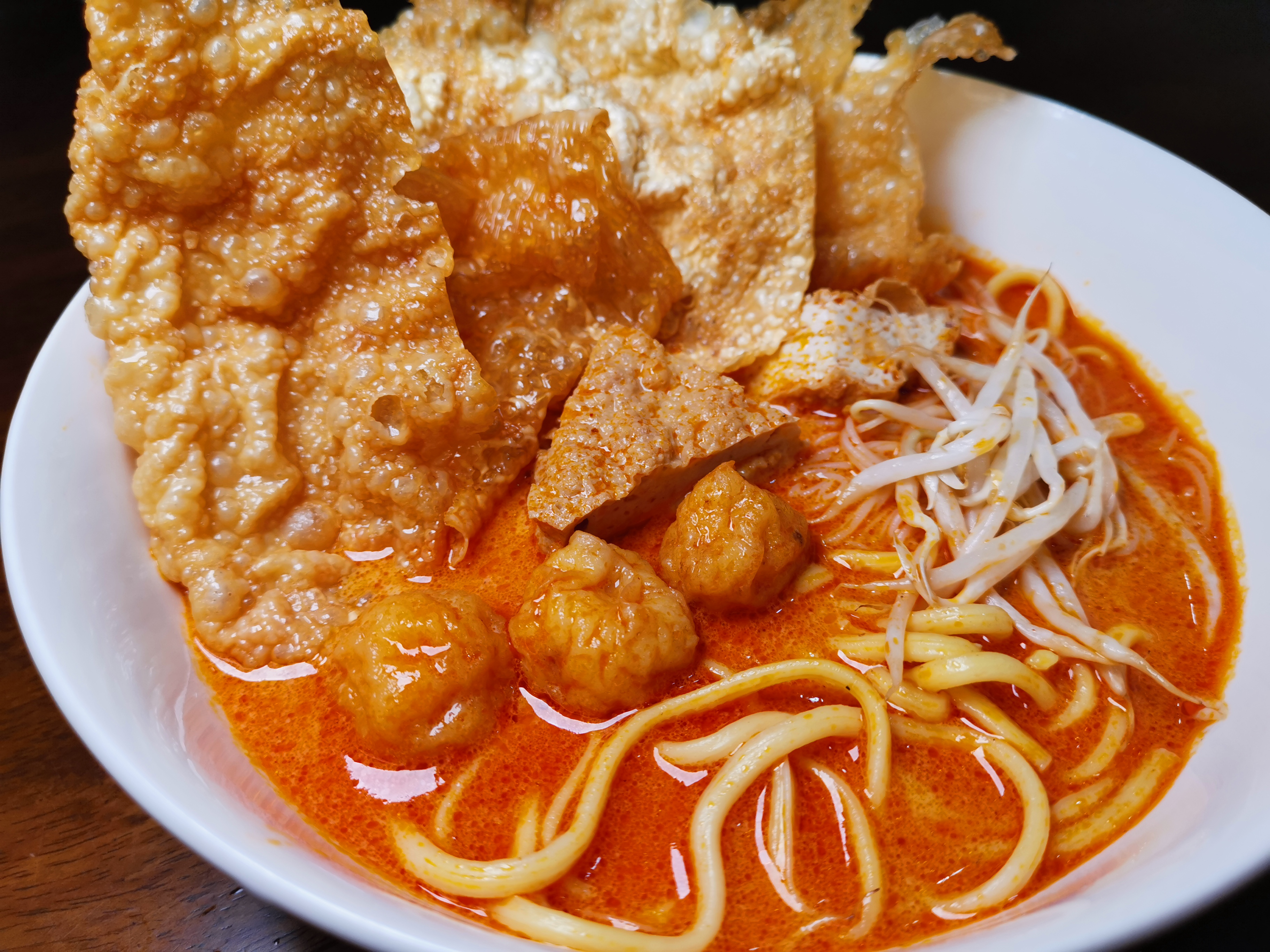
A variant of Malaysian-style curry laksa

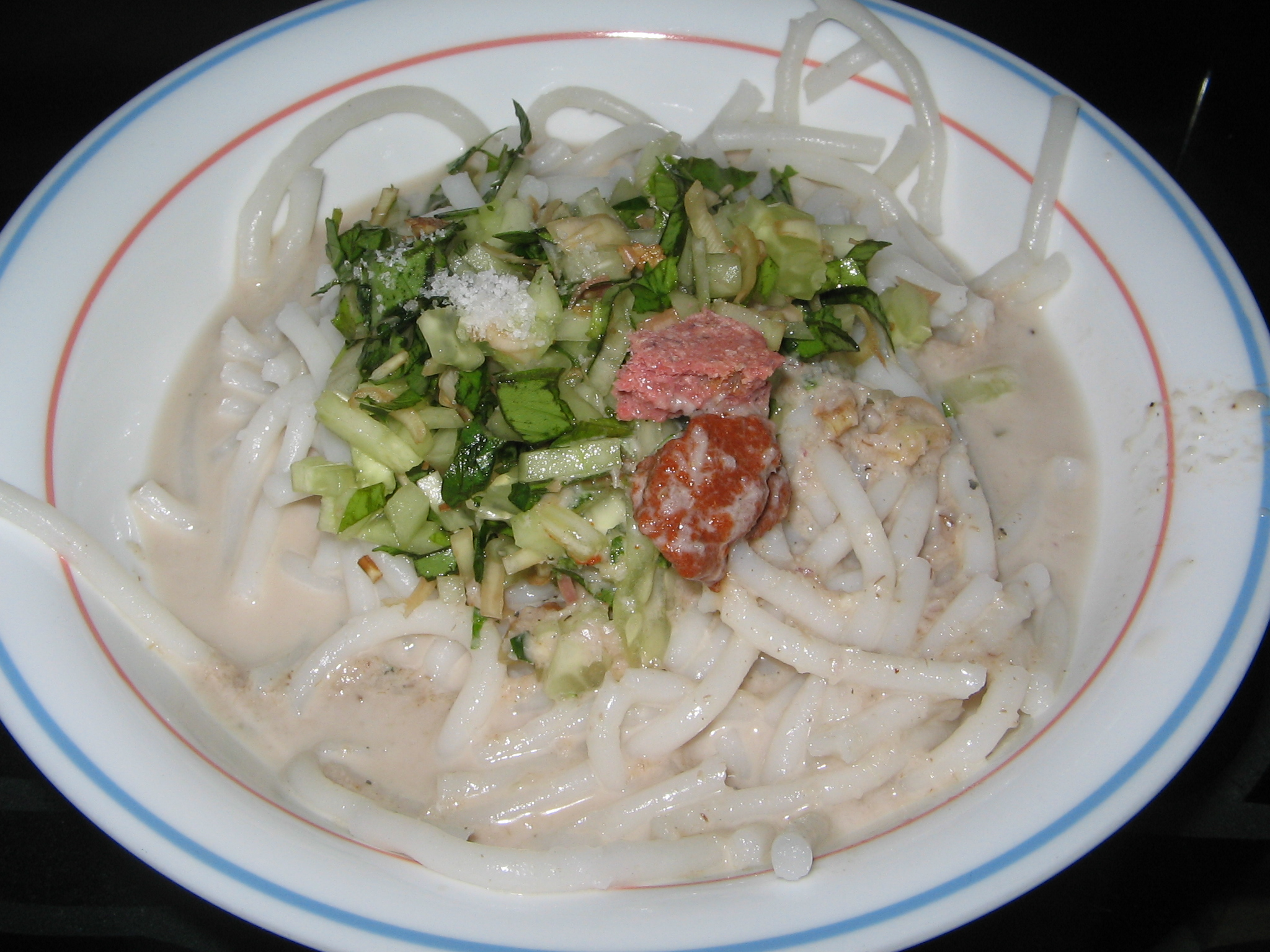
Kelantanese-style laksa

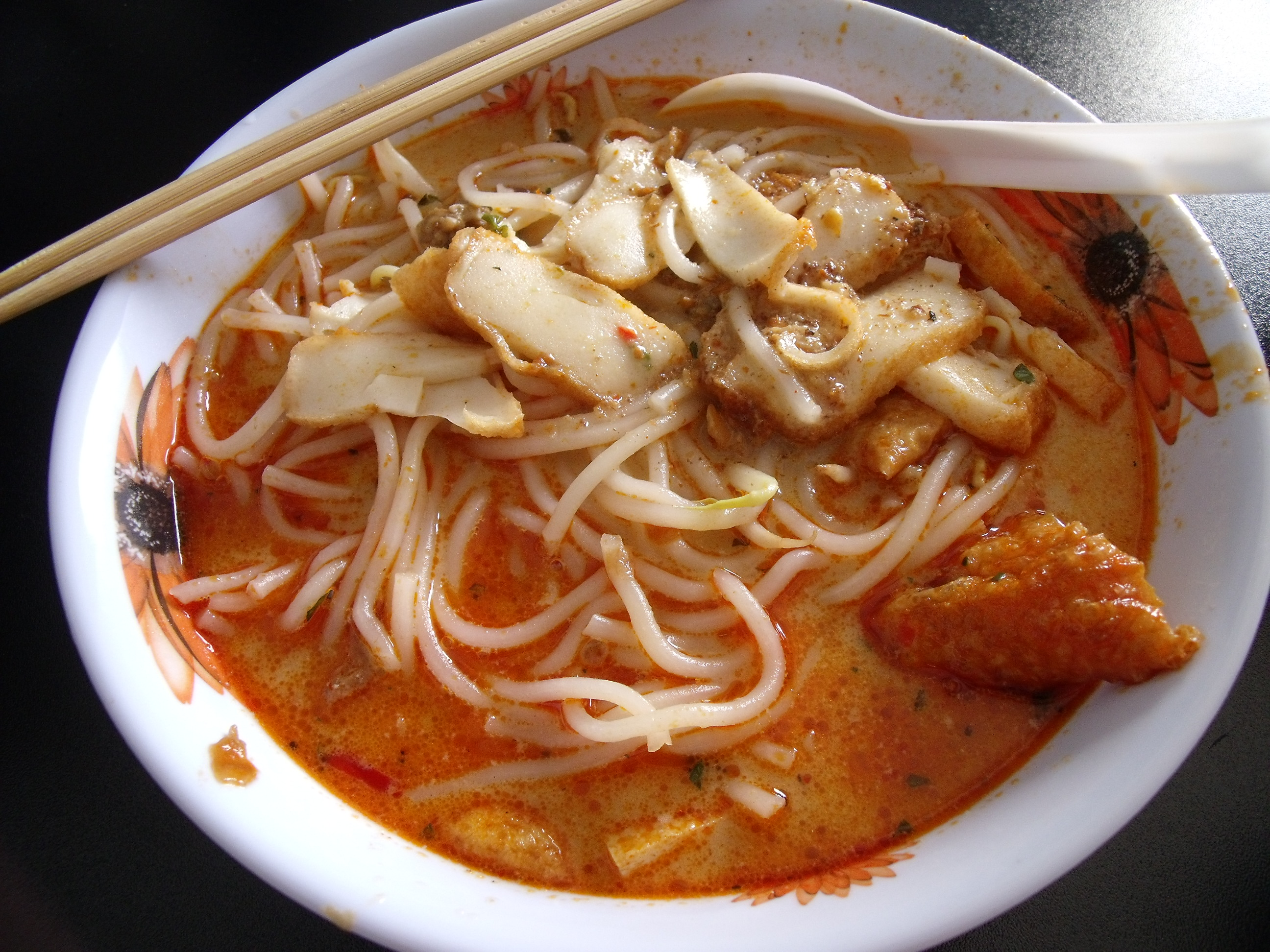
A typical bowl of Singaporean-style laksa

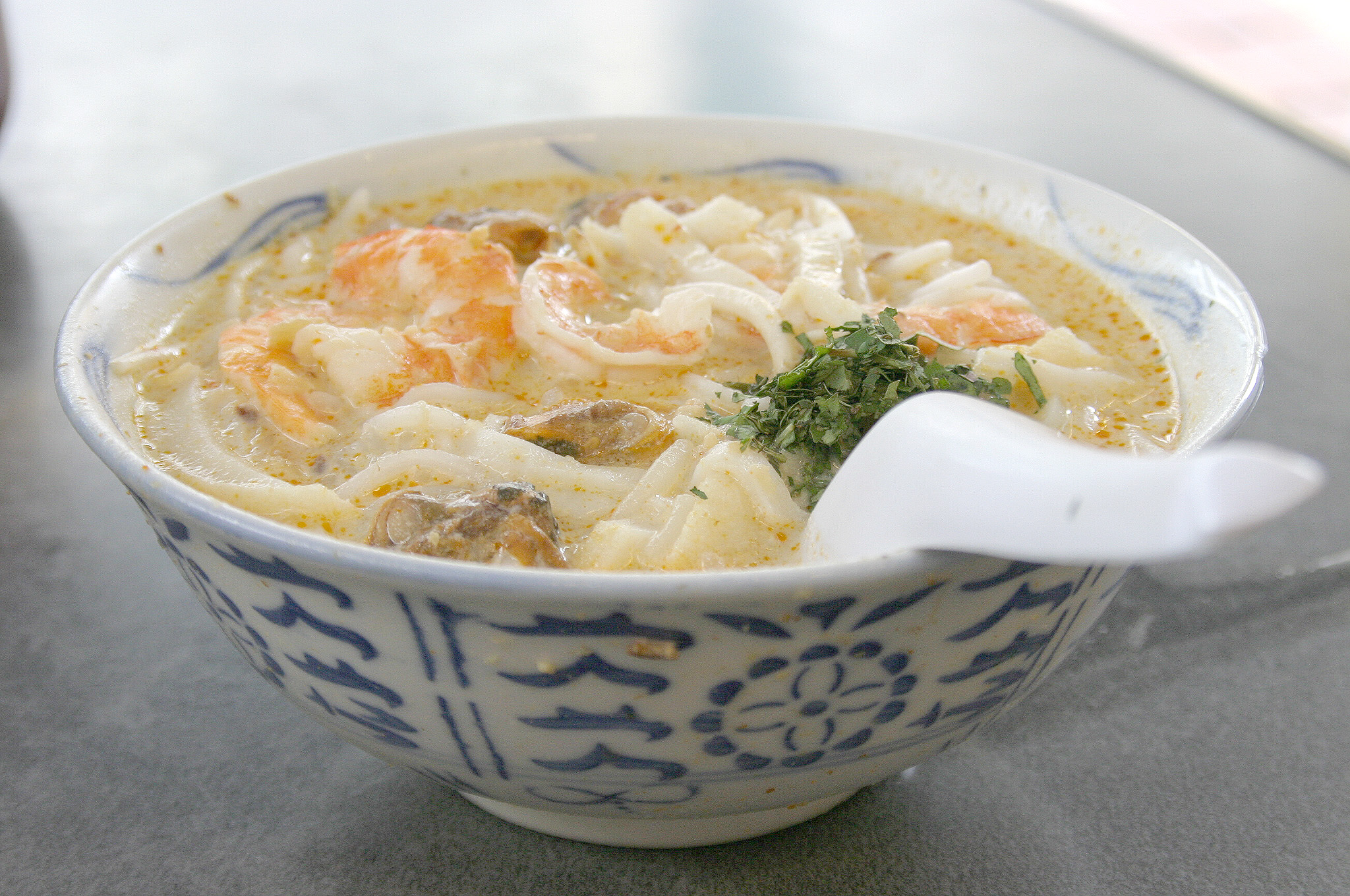
Katong laksa, a variant of Singaporean-style laksa

=== Philippines ===
In the Philippines, the very diverse class of soups and stews cooked in coconut milk are collectively known as ginataan. They include both savory and dessert dishes. Savory examples of ginataan soups and stews include ginataang kalabasa, sinilihan, and tiyula itum. Dessert examples include binignit, bilo-bilo, and ginataang mais.

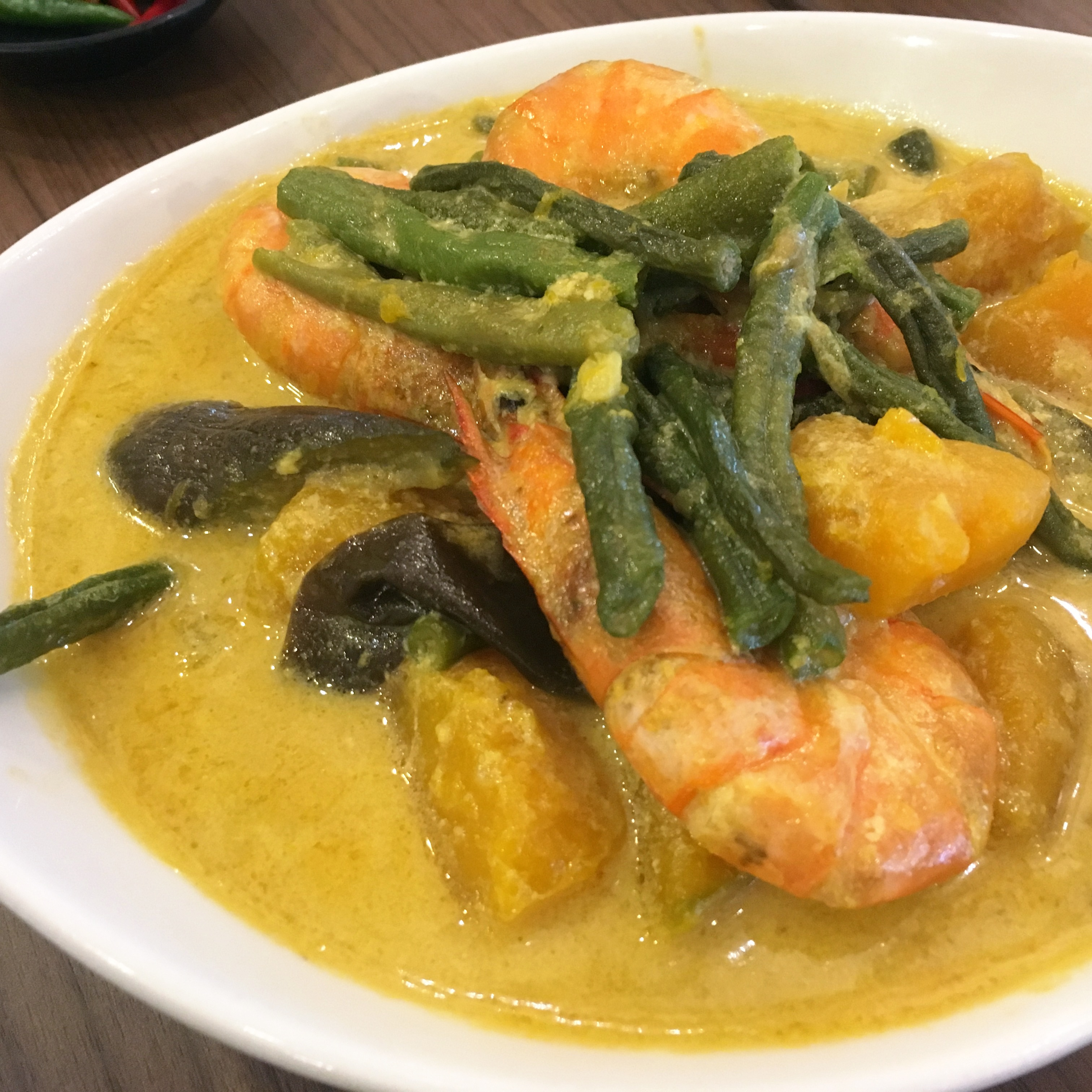
Ginataang kalabasa

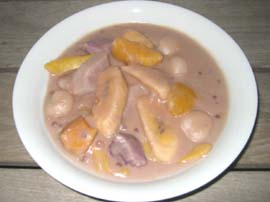
Binignit

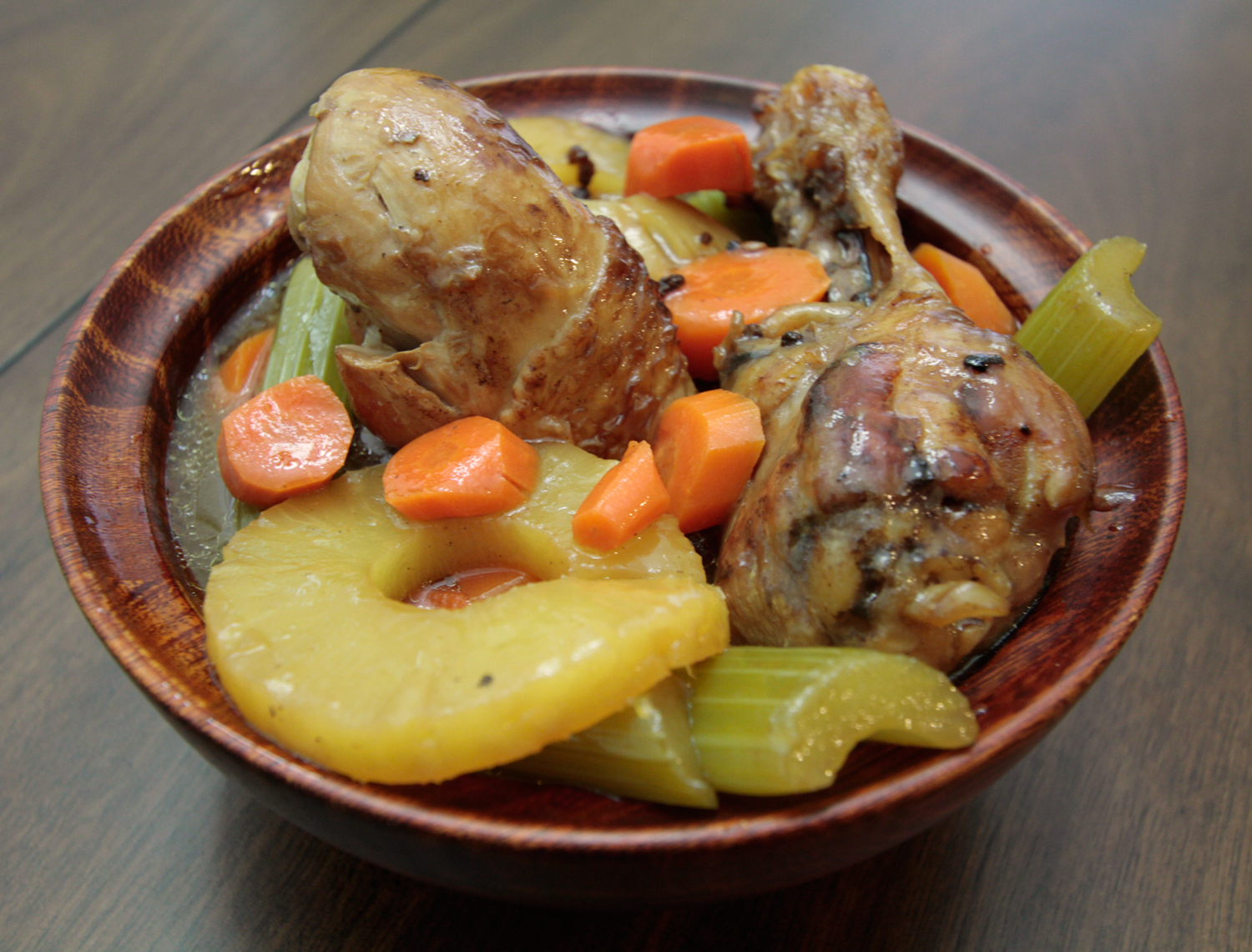
Pininyahang manok

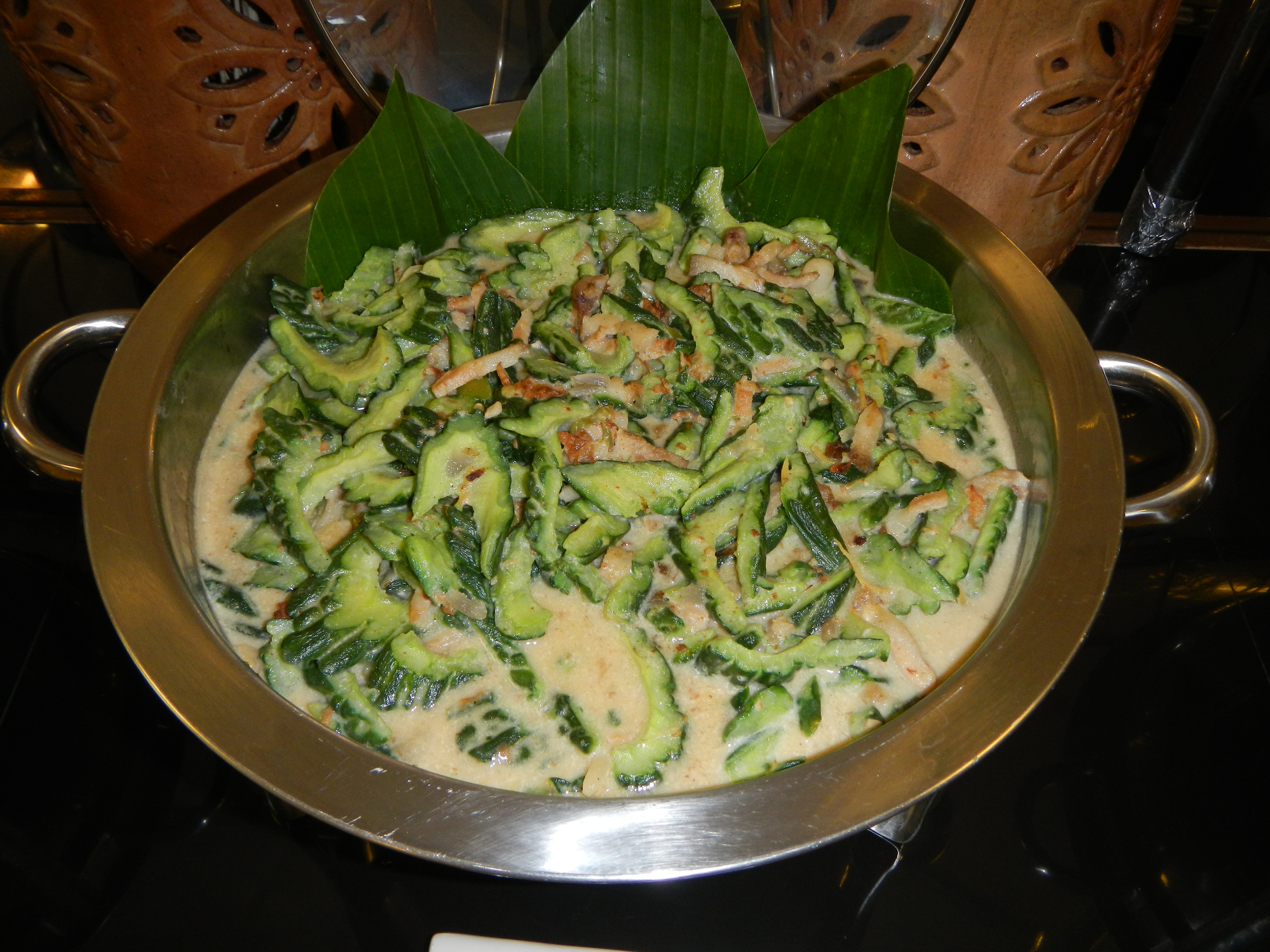
Ginataang ampalaya

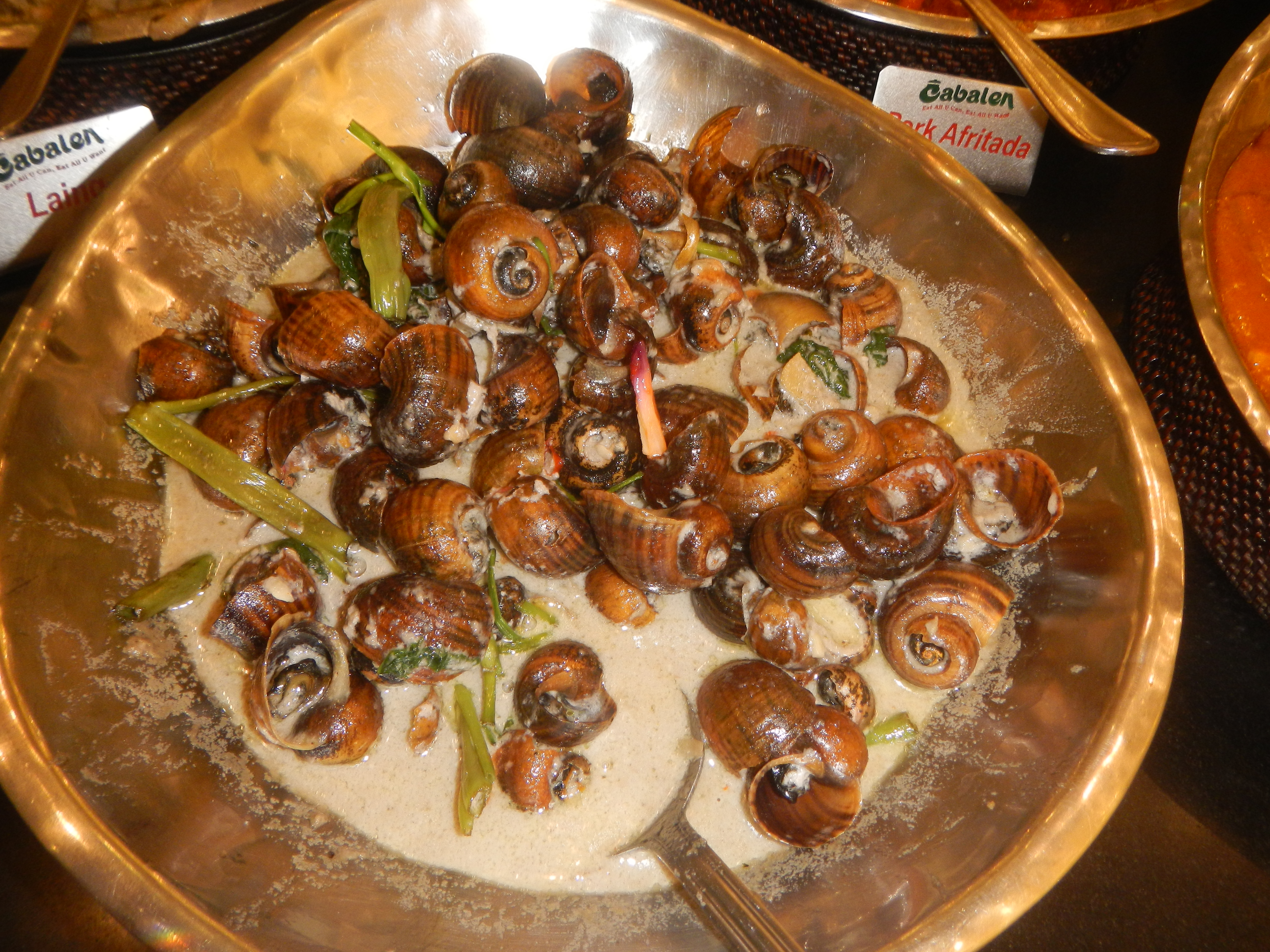
Ginataang kohol

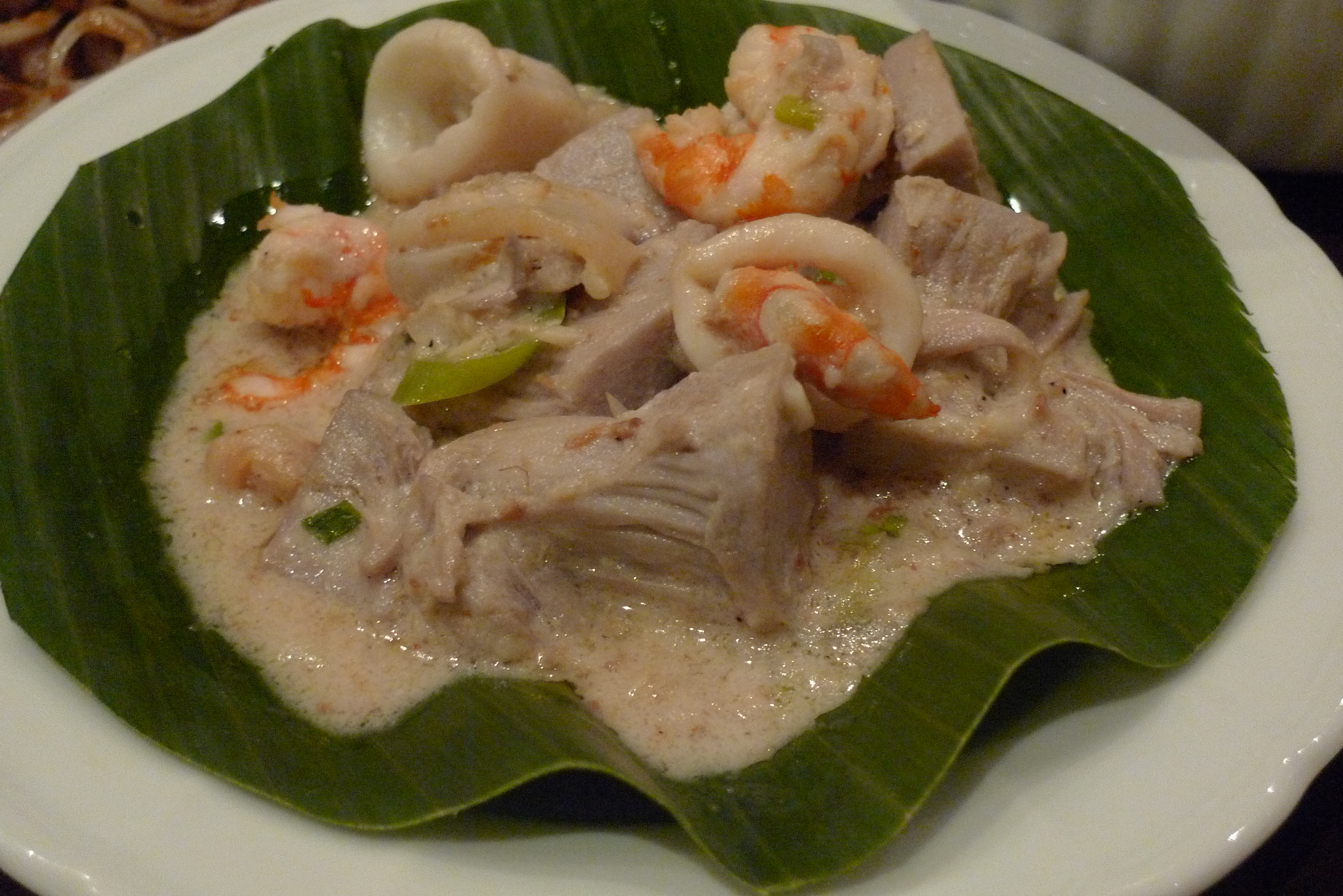
Ginataang langka

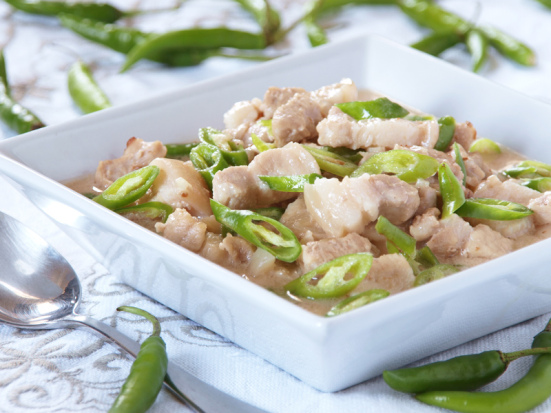
Sinilihan

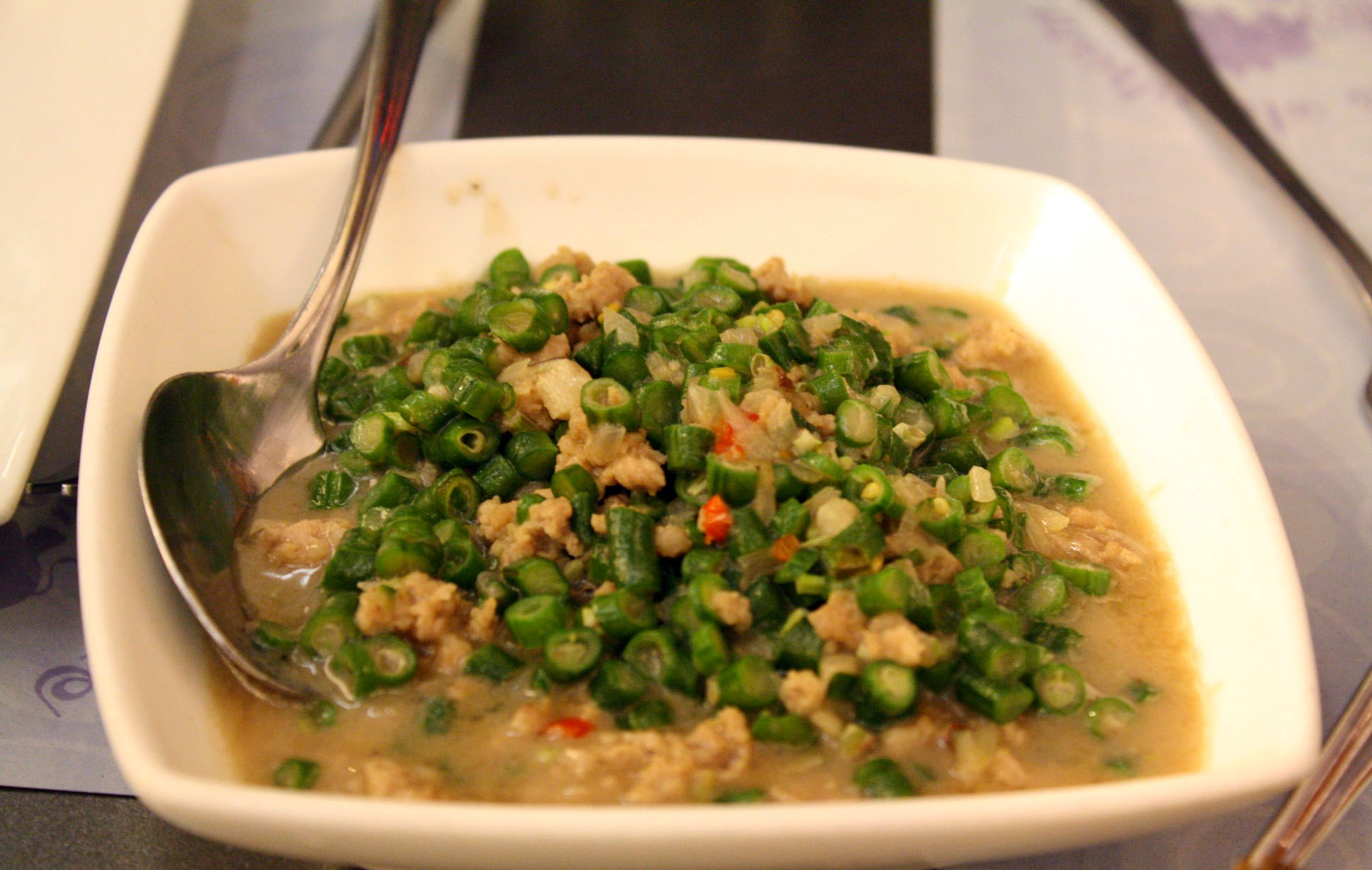
Gising-gising

=== Thailand ===
Thai Khao soi is a noodle soup dish prepared with egg noodles, coconut milk, curry, and meats such as beef and chicken, and served with pickled mustard greens and raw shallots. Red curry is a Thai soup prepared using coconut milk, meats, and red curry as main ingredients. Tom kha kai (Thai coconut soup) is a Thai soup prepared using coconut milk, chicken, mushrooms, chili peppers, galangal, lemongrass, and other ingredients. Tom yam kathi is a Thai coconut soup and a variant of tom yum prepared using coconut milk.

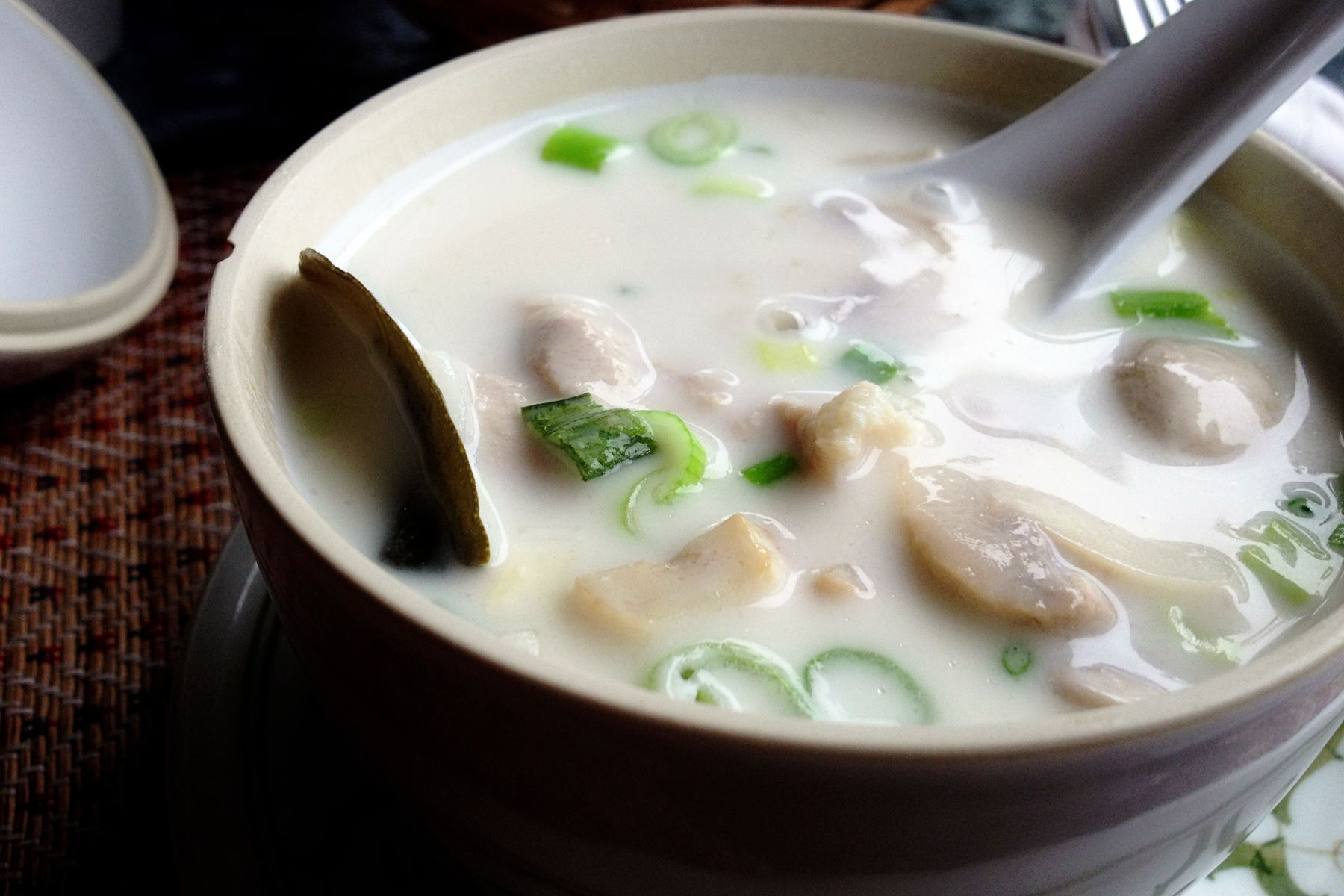
Tom kha kai

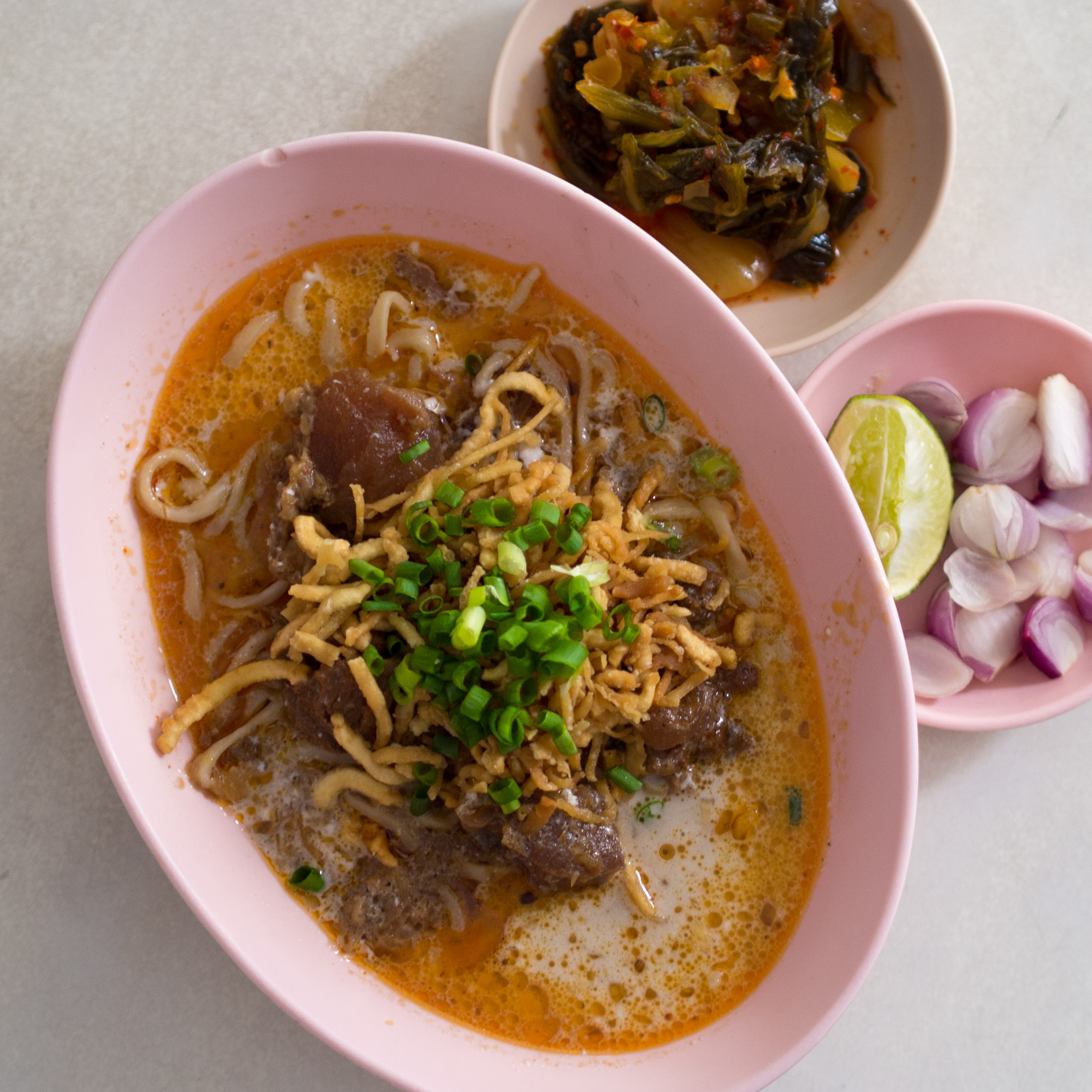
Beef khao soi

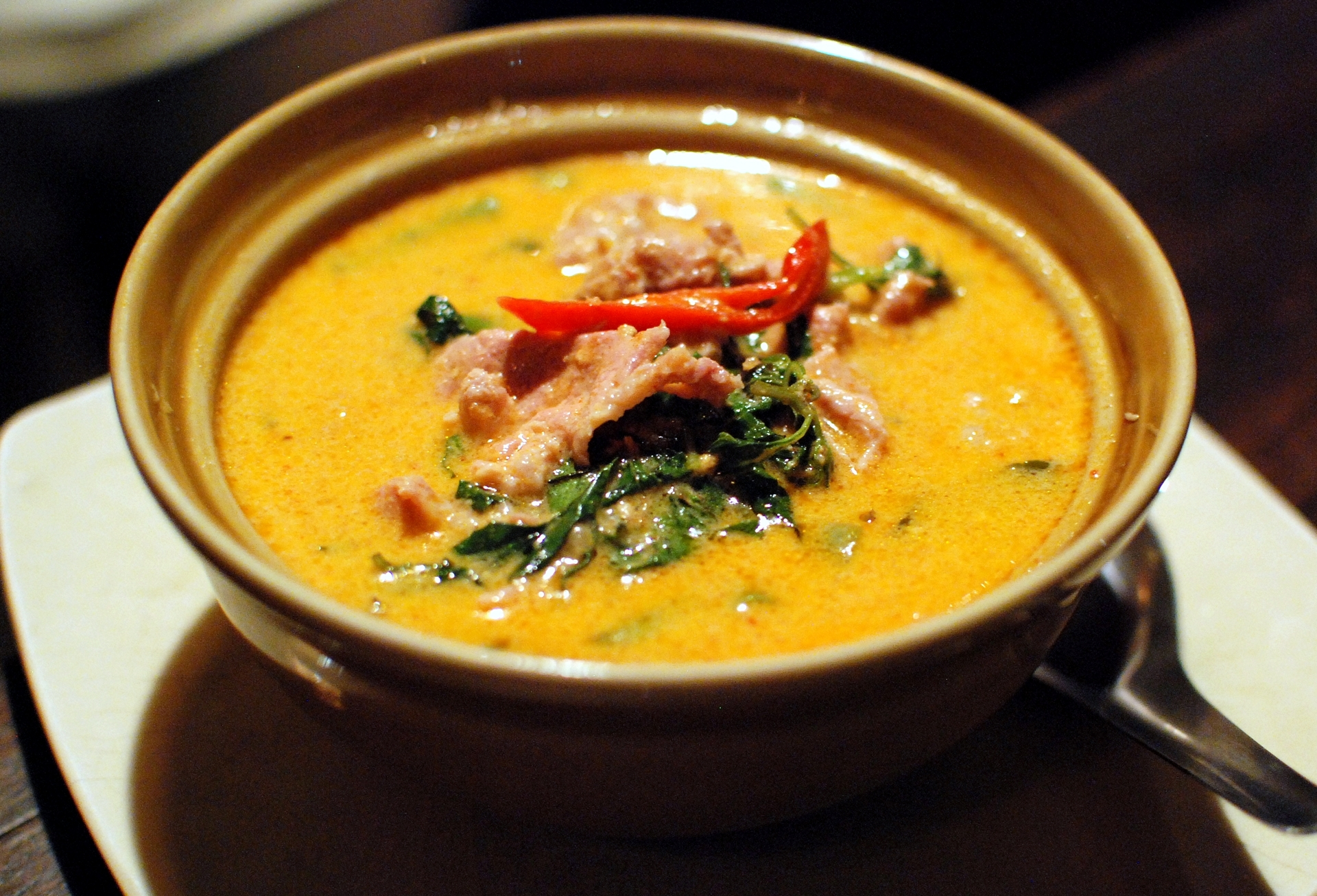
Thai red curry soup with pork

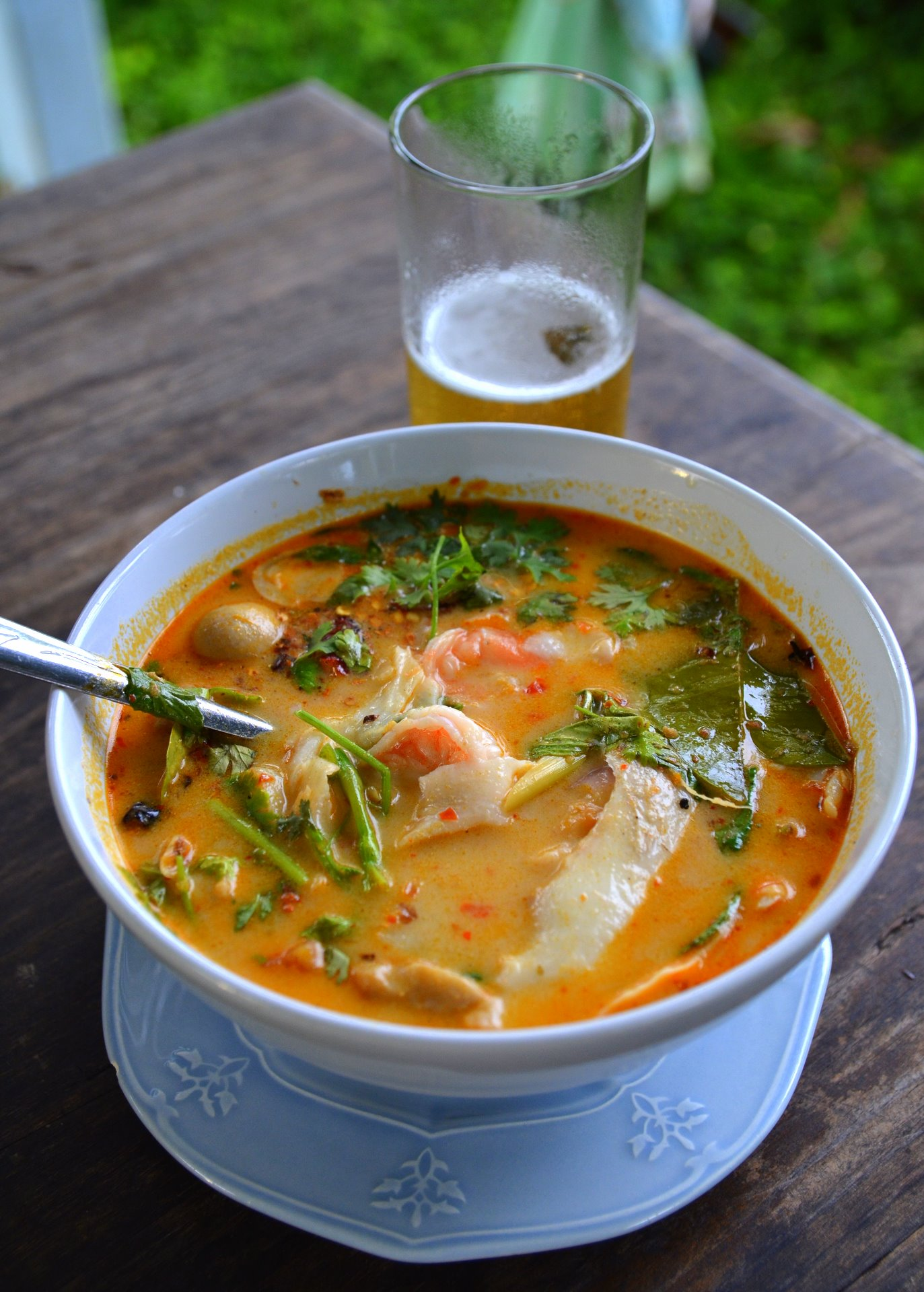
Tom yam soup with fresh coconut meat

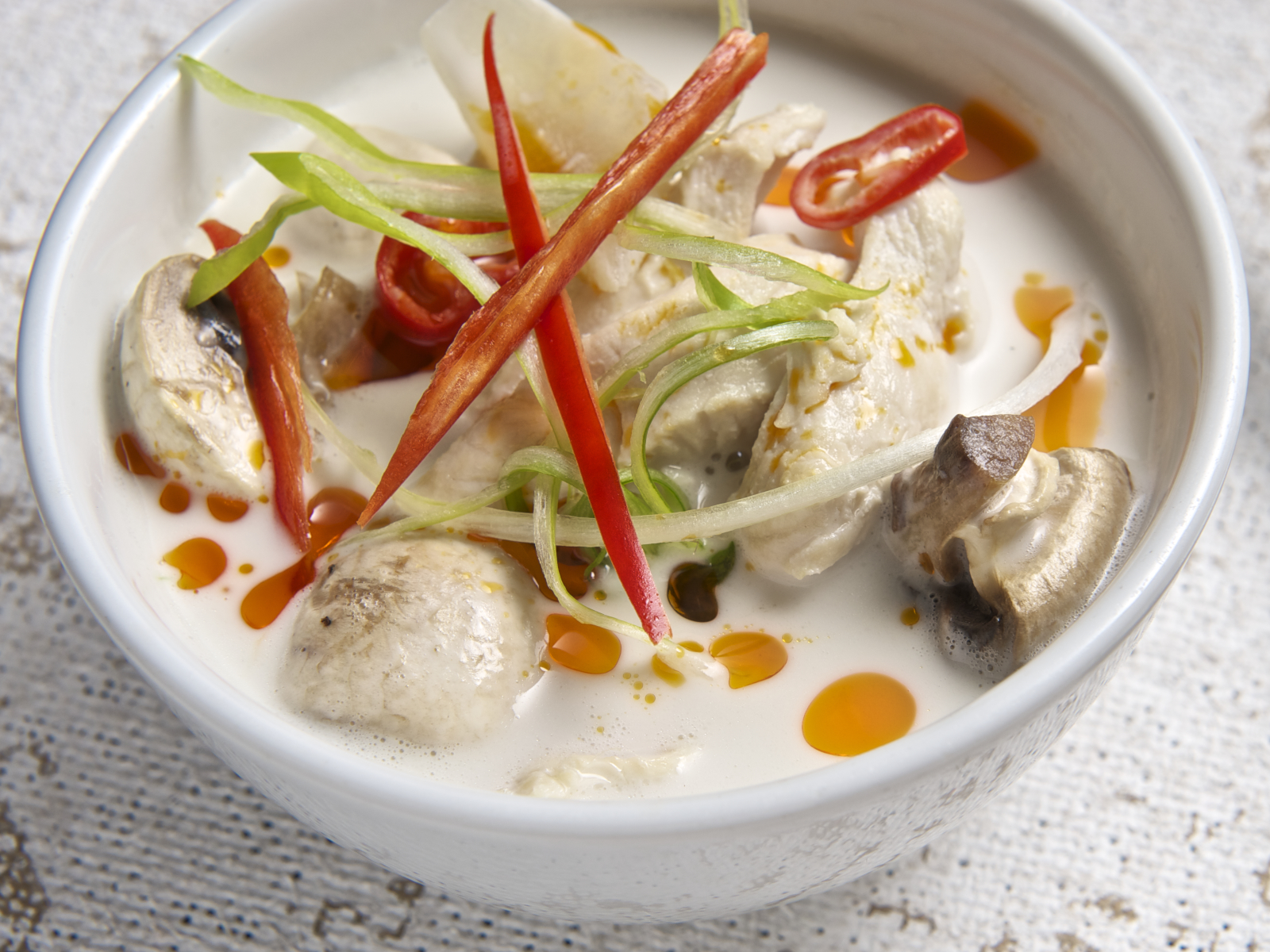
Tom kha kai

== See also ==
- Asian soups
- Chè bà ba – a Vietnamese dessert that includes coconut milk soup as an ingredient
- List of coconut dishes
- List of dishes made using coconut milk
- List of soups
- Mie koclok – An Indonesian chicken noodle soup that is served in coconut milk soup
- Molagoottal – a South Indian stew prepared using coconut and lentils
