= Ginataan =

Filipino dish made with coconut milk

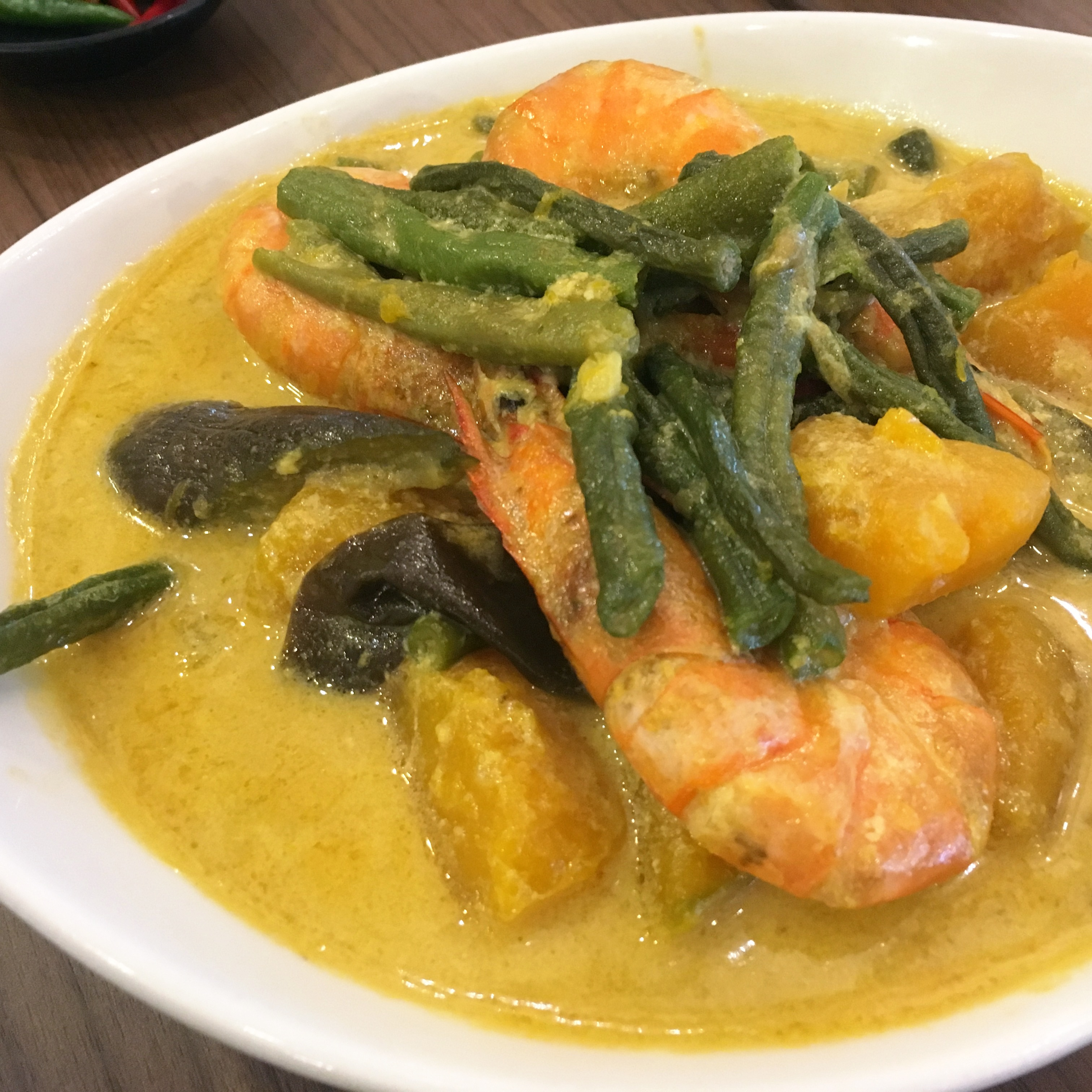
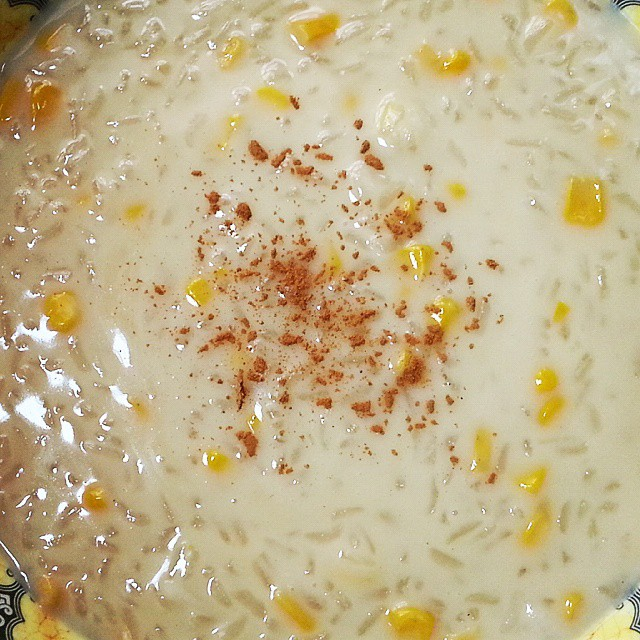
- Top: Ginataang kalabasa (calabaza and string beans in coconut milk) with shrimp; Bottom: Ginataang mais, a dessert rice gruel (lugaw) with sweet corn and coconut milk
- Course: Main course, dessert
- Place of origin: The Philippines
- Serving temperature: Hot or cold
- Main ingredients: Coconut milk (gatâ)

Ginataan (pronounced: GHEE-nah-ta-AN), alternatively spelled guinataan, is a Filipino term which refers to food cooked with gatâ (coconut milk). Literally translated, ginataan means "done with coconut milk". Due to the general nature of the term, it may refer to a number of different dishes, each called ginataan, but distinct from one another.

During the Spanish colonial era, ginataan was brought to Mexico through the Manila galleons which docked in Acapulco. Today, it has become naturalized in the regional cuisines of Guerrero and Colima, like the zambaripao or the tuba. In Spanish it is called guinatán.

== Terminology ==
Ginataan is the affixed form of gatâ ("coconut milk"): g- + -in- + -atâ + -an ("done with coconut milk"). It usually refers to dishes which are eaten with rice during the major meals of the day. It normally follows the form "ginataan na/ginataang + (whatever it is cooked with)" or "(dish name) + sa gatâ". For example, ginataang hipon refers to shrimp cooked in coconut milk, ginataang gulay to an assortment of vegetables cooked in coconut milk, ginataang alimango is mud crab cooked in coconut milk, while ginataang manok is chicken cooked in coconut milk. Coconut milk may be added to existing dishes as in ginataang adobo (known more commonly in Tagalog as adobo sa gatâ).

There are other dishes which are known by unique names including Bicol express, laing and variants of pinakbet, which nonetheless fall under the ginataan category because they use coconut milk as one of the main ingredients.

=== Sweet variants ===
Various sweet desserts may also simply be called ginataan, especially in the northern Philippines. For example, the Visayan binignit, a soup made with coconut milk, glutinous rice, tubers, tapioca pearls, and sago is simply called ginataan in Tagalog (a shortened form of the proper name, ginataang halo-halo). This soup is also called "giná-tan" in Bikolano, "ginettaán" in Ilokano, and "ginat-ang lugaw" in Hiligaynon. If gummy balls made of pounded glutinous rice are used instead of plain glutinous rice, it becomes a dish called ginataang bilo-bilo or simply bilo-bilo. Ginataang mais is another example of a dessert soup; a warm, sweet, thick gruel made with coconut milk, sweet corn, and glutinous rice.

== List of ginataan dishes ==
Dishes considered under the ginataan category include:

=== Main dishes ===
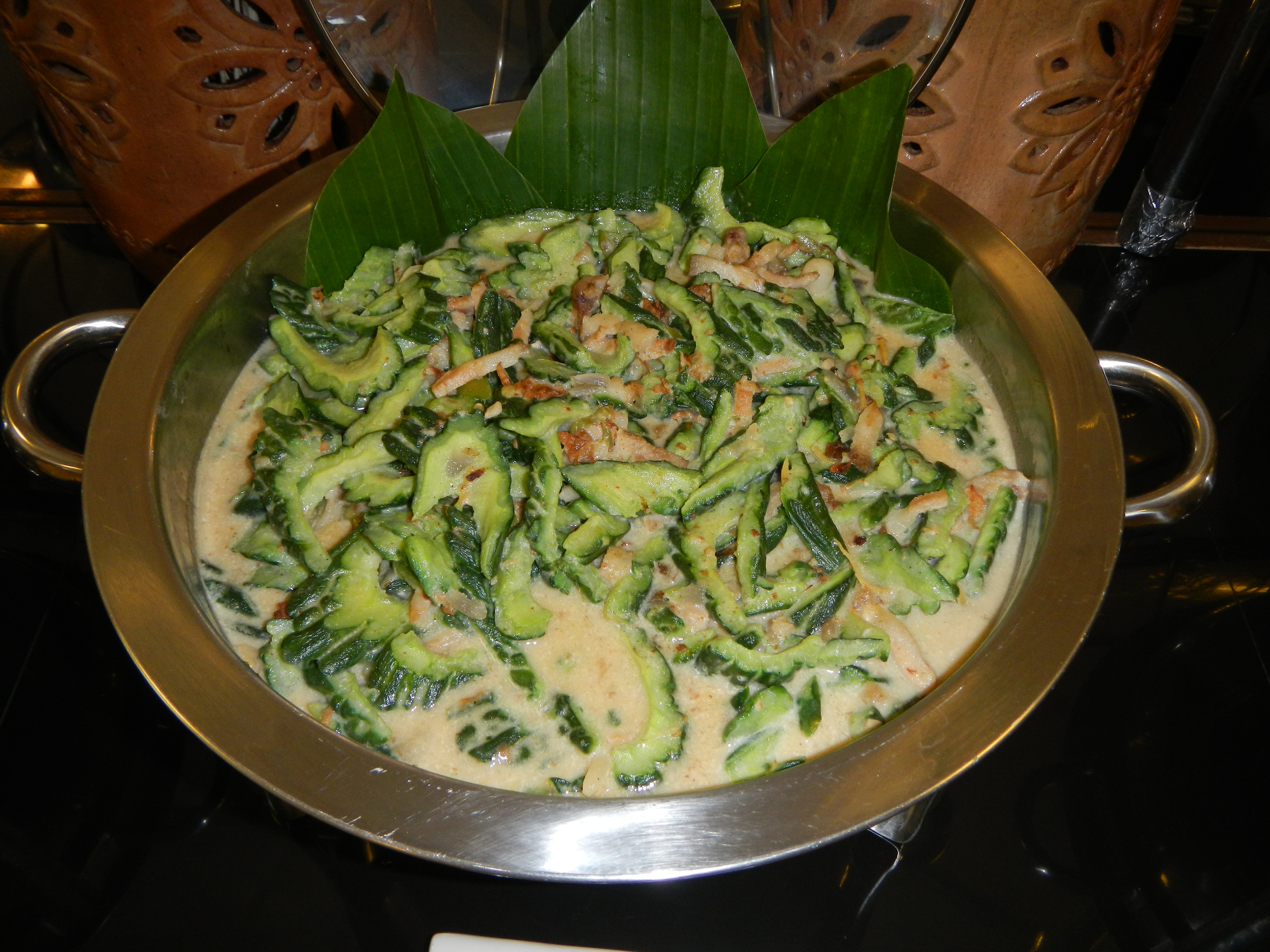
Ginataang ampalaya, bitter melon and tinapa in coconut milk

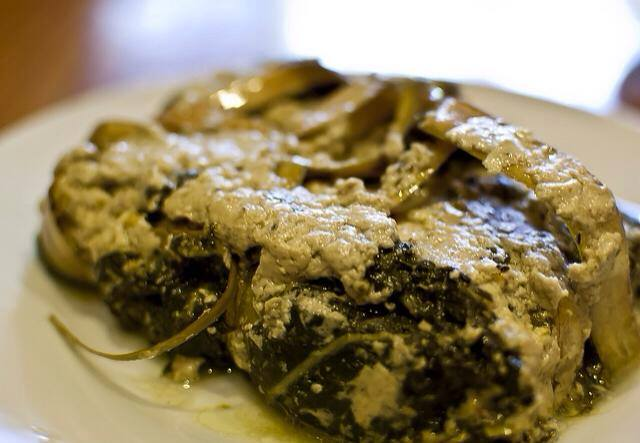
Laing, taro leaves with meat or seafood in coconut milk

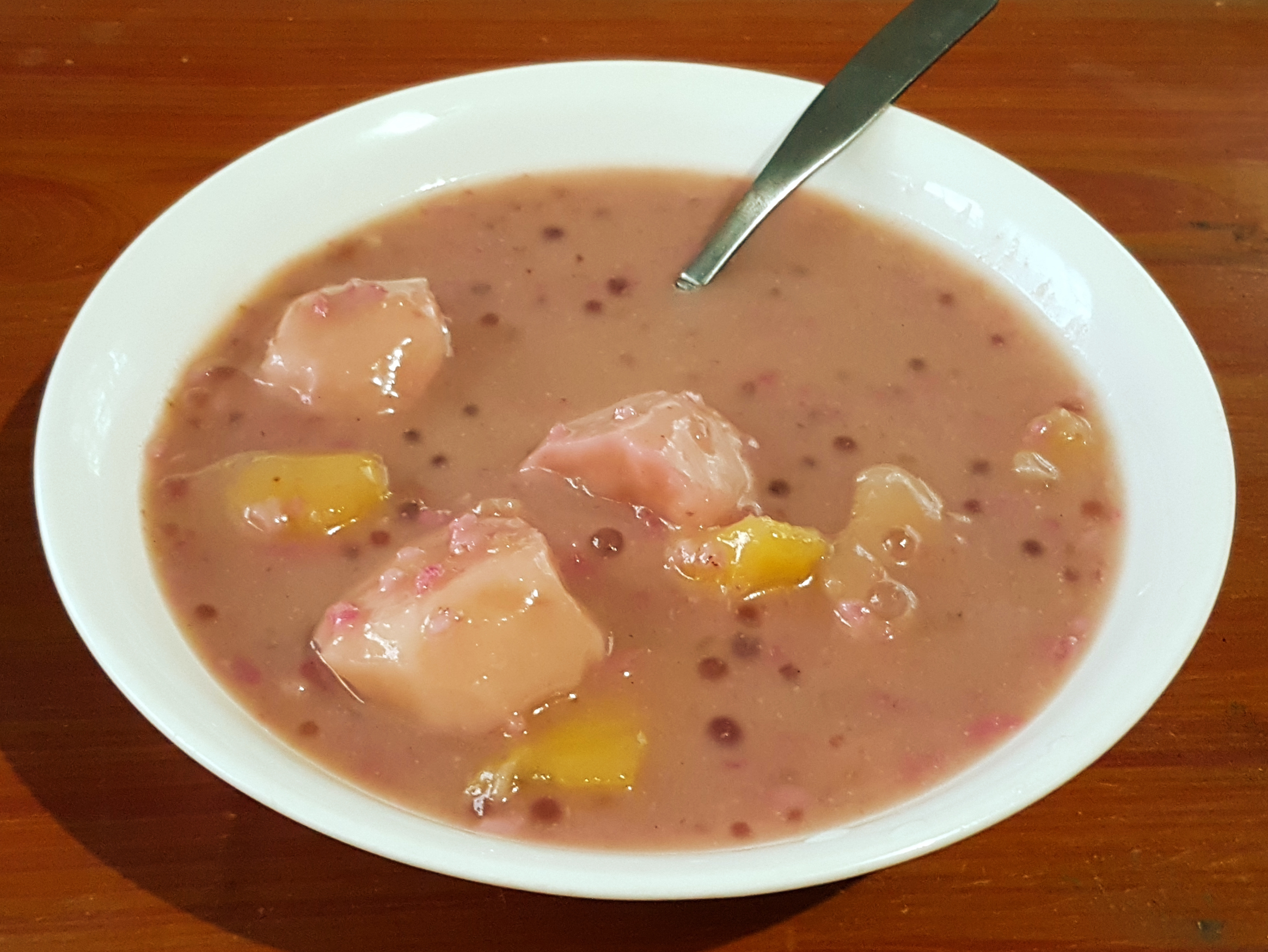
Binignit, a dessert soup of various root crops, fruits, tapioca pearls, and glutinous rice in coconut milk

Tinumtuman is a dish from the Bicol Region prepared with thinly sliced bamboo shoots, coconut milk and clams sautéed in ginger, garlic and onions.

- Adobo sa gata
- Adobong pusit sa gata
- Afritada sa gata
- Beef kulma
- Binagoongan sa gata
- Biniton
- Bringhe or Biringi
- Curacha Alavar
- Dinuguan sa gata (Tinutungang dinuguan)
- Ginataang baka
- Ginataang alimango
- Ginataang alimasag (kasag, masag, lambay, alama)(for both Portunus pelagicus and Portunus sanguinolentus)
- Ginataang ampalaya
- Ginataang curacha (kuratsa)
- Ginataang hipon
- Ginataang isda
- Ginataang kalabasa
- Ginataang kuhol
- Ginataang kuray (kagang)
- Ginataang labong
- Ginataang langka
- Ginataang lupo
- Ginataang manok
- Ginataang pinakbet
- Ginataang Puso ng Saging
- Ginataang talangka (kalampay, kappi/kapi, katang, diyak, agag/kagag)
- Ginataang tatus (rasa)
- Ginataang tuyom or swaki
- Ginataang ubod
- Ginataang upo
- Ginisang munggo sa gata
- Gising-gising (ginataang sigarilyas)
- Inubarang manok
- Inulukan
- Junay (food)
- Kaldereta sa gata
- Kinilaw
- Kinunot
- Kulawo
- Laing
- Lawot-lawot
- Linarang
- Linigil a manok
- Menudo sa gata
- Oko-oko with coconut milk
- Pancit buko
- Piaparan
- Pinais
- Pininyahang hipon
- Pininyahang manok
- Piyanggang manok
- Piyassak
- Rendang
- Sarsa na uyang
- Sinanglay
- Sinantolan
- Sinilihan (Bicol express)
- Sinina
- Sorol
- Tinumok
- Tinumtuman
- Tiyula itum

=== Dessert ===
- Amik (variants: Tinagtag, Tagaktak, Jaa/Jata sa gata)
- Bibingka
- Bibingkang malagkit
- Biko
- Bilo-bilo
- Binagol
- Binaki
- Binatog sa gata
- Binignit
- Biniribid
- Biyaki
- Binungey
- Binutong
- Cassava cake
- Coconut toffee (Balikutsa, Butong-butong, Tira-tira, Gináok, Pulot)
  - Matamís sa báo (Sundot kulangot)
- Daral
- Dodol
- Espasol
- Gelatin sa gata (or Layered gulaman cake)
- Ginataang agal-agal (or Ginataang guso)
- Ginataang mais
- Ginataang munggo
- Ginataang saang
- Ginataang saba
- Ginilu (Samalamig na gata at gulaman)
- Guinomis
- Ibos
- Inutak
- Kalamay
- Kaluko (Kinaluko)
- Latik
- Maja blanca
- Minatamis na kurot/kayos/nami/namo/kolad
- Moche
- Morón
- Nilupak
  - Nilubyan
- Panyalam
- Pasung
- Patupát (Tikob)
- Pennato de Uno
- Pichi-pichi sa gata
- Pinakro
- Puto maya
- Puto manapla
- Salukara
- Sapin-sapin
- Sayongsong (Balisungsong, Sarungsong)
- Sili ice cream
- Sinakol
- Sorbetes
- Suman
- Suman na saging (Balintawak, Bubungkung)
- Tinubong (Diket sa bulu)
- Tupig
- Ube halaya

== See also ==
- Coconut soup
- Gulai
- List of dishes using coconut milk
- List of soups
