= Binignit =

Visayan dessert made from sweet potato and/or taro in coconut milk

Binignit l
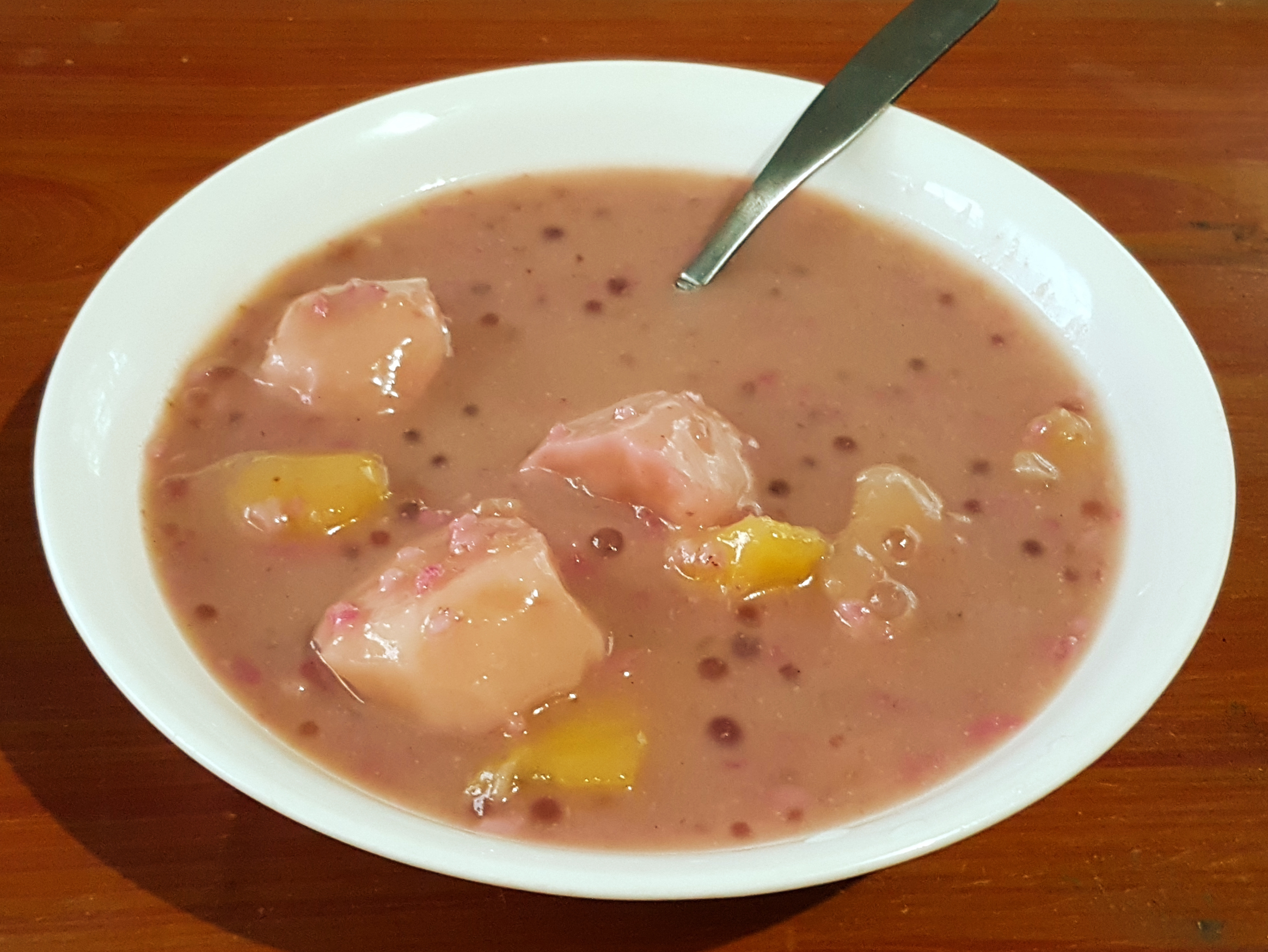
- Binignit
- Alternative names: wit-wit, giná-tan, tinunuan, alpahor, ginettaán, ginat-an, ginat-ang lugaw, pinindot, ginataang bilo-bilo, ginataang halo-halo
- Course: Dessert
- Place of origin: Philippines
- Region or state: Visayas, Mindanao
- Serving temperature: Hot or cold
- Main ingredients: glutinous rice, coconut milk, saba, taro, ube, sweet potato, pearl sago, landang
- Variations: bilo-bilo
- Similar dishes: lugaw, ginataan

Binignit is a Visayan dessert soup from the central Philippines. The dish is traditionally made with glutinous rice cooked in coconut milk with various slices of sabá bananas, taro, ube, and sweet potato, among other ingredients. It is comparable to various dessert guinataán (coconut milk-based) dishes found in other regions, such as bilo-bilo. Among the Visayan people, the dish is traditionally served on Good Friday of Holy Week.

== Names ==
Binignit is also called giná-tan in Bikolano, tabirák in Mindanao Cebuano, alpahor in Chavacano, wit-wit in Hiligaynon, ginettaán, tambo-tambong, and paradusdos in Ilokano, ginat-an (or ginat-ang lugaw) in Waray and Hiligaynon/Ilonggo, kamlo in western Iloilo, scramble in Tuguegarao City, linugaw in Bacolod, and eangkuga by Akeanons in Aklan. It is also sometimes called tabirak in Cagayan de Oro and Misamis Oriental.

Binignit is considered a type of lugaw (rice gruel) and guinataán (dishes cooked in coconut milk).

== Preparation ==
The meat of a mature coconut is grated and the "thick" milk (coconut cream) is extracted. Two cups of water are then added to the grated coconut, and a second extraction is made. This becomes the "thin" milk. This "thin" coconut milk extract is added to cubed kamote (sweet potato), gabi (taro) and ube (purple yam), sliced ripe sabá bananas, langka (jack fruit), and tapioca pearls. Sometimes, young coconut meat strips are also added. This is simmered on low to medium heat, to prevent the coconut milk from curdling. Glutinous rice (pilit) is added once the root crops have sufficiently softened and the mixture is brought to a boil; being stirred occasionally until done. Just before removal from the flame, the "thick" coconut milk is added.

The people of the neighboring island of Leyte use ingredients such as landang (palm flour jelly balls), jackfruit, and anise, and thicken it with milled glutinous rice. The vegetables and the pearl sago are cooked in a mixture of water, coconut milk and landang, and sweetened by muscovado or brown sugar.

For the people of Panay, their version contains balls made of glutinous flour, as well as jackfruit. The balls are formed and boiled until they float, indicating that they are cooked. These are then added to the linugaw or eangkuga. This is similar to the preparation of bilo-bilo but the locals call it by eangkuga or linugaw.

== Cultural significance ==
A popular afternoon snack, it is best served when hot. Others serve it chilled or even frozen, eating the dessert much like ice cream. Among the Visayan people, the soup is also widely cooked and eaten for the Holy Week, especially during Good Friday when observant Catholics fast and avoid meat.

== See also ==
- Ginataan
- Ginataang mais
- Halo-halo
- Kolak
- List of soups
- Lugaw
