= Sorol (food) =

Filipino dish

- Course: Main course
- Place of origin: Philippines
- Region or state: Camiguin
- Main ingredients: Coconut milk, chicken, Mexican oregano, ginger, labuyo chili, onions, and tomatoes
- Variations: see Ginataan

Sorol is a Filipino dish consisting of chicken cooked in a coconut milk–based broth primarily made with ginger, Mexican oregano (kalabo), labuyo chili, and tomatoes. The dish originates from the island of Camiguin. It is a type of ginataan. It can also be made with pork, beef, or seafood. Mexican oregano may be difficult to acquire and thus some versions use other herbs like lemongrass, other types of oregano or sage.

== See also ==
- Afritada
- Sarsiado
- Tinola
