= Sago pudding =

Desert made with sago, milk and sugar

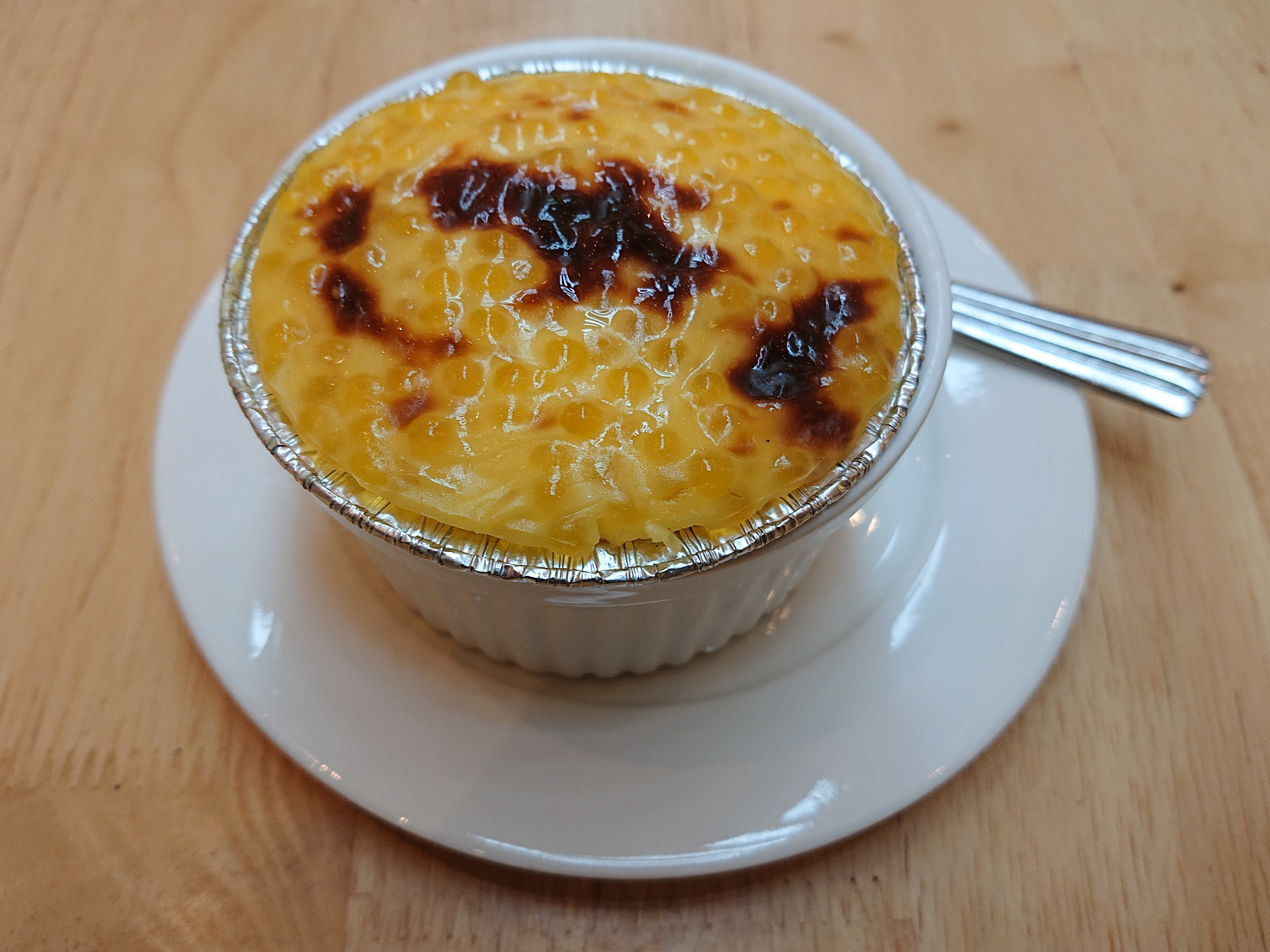
- Sago pudding in Hong Kong
- Type: Pudding
- Main ingredients: Sago, water or milk, sugar
- Variations: Sago gula melaka, thagu byin

Sago pudding is a sweet pudding made by combining sago pearls with water, milk, or milk-like liquids like coconut milk and adding sweetener and sometimes additional flavourings. It is made in many cultures with varying styles, and may be produced in a variety of ways. Southeast Asia, especially Indonesia and Malaysia, produces the majority of sago.

In Malaysia, sago gula melaka is a sago pudding made by boiling pearl sago in water and serving it with syrup of palm sugar (gula melaka) and coconut milk.

In Myanmar, thagu byin (Burmese: သာဂူပြင်) is a sago pudding made with sago, coconut milk and condensed milk.

Sago pudding is also a popular delicacy in New Guinea.

In the UK, "sago pudding" is generally made by boiling pearl sago and sugar in milk until the sago pearls become clear, and thickening it with eggs or cornflour. Depending on the proportions used it can range from a runny consistency to fairly thick, and can be similar to tapioca pudding or rice pudding. In the UK "sago pudding" is often referred to as "frog spawn" as it is made using pearl sago. Tapioca pudding is similar in that it too can be made using pearl tapioca – it can also be called "frog spawn" but is generally made using flake tapioca in the north which results in a finer, more grainy, consistency.

== See also ==
- Bilo-bilo
- Gulaman
- Tapioca pudding
