= Landang =

Variety of palm

landang
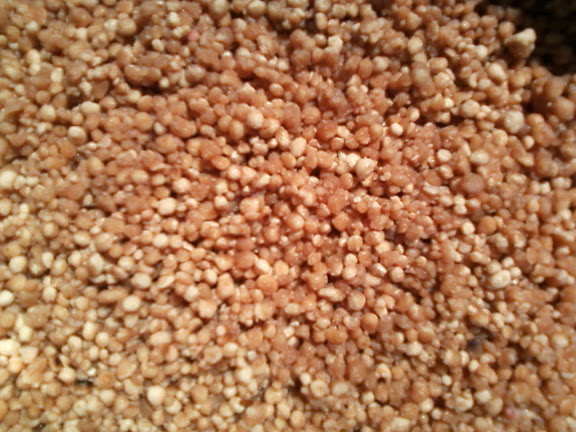
- Washed uncooked landang
- Alternative names: palm flour jelly balls
- Course: Dessert
- Place of origin: Philippines
- Region or state: Cebu, Visayas
- Serving temperature: cooked
- Main ingredients: Palm tree flour

Landang is a processed starch product extracted from the inner trunk of the buli or buri tree (Corypha), a type of palm native to the Philippines and other tropical countries. This tree only flowers once in its life and then dies. Landang is visually similar to shrunken, flattened sago. It is traditionally used in making binignit in the Visayas.

== Preparation ==
The process is very similar in making sago. First, the buli palm is felled. The hard core can be reached by breaking the trunk open. The hard core is chopped into fragments that should be dried perfectly and hand crushed into powder form thereby turning it into flour. This process requires several rounds of pounding. This is then mixed with water to form the product. It can be stored for weeks or a few months.

== Uses ==
Landang is essential in making the traditional Visayan binignit, a sweet rootcrop and banana stewed in coconut milk and brown sugar, usually eaten during the Lenten season in the Philippines when almost everyone is fasting.

== Botany ==
Buli is a type of palm is usually found in tropical areas of South Central Asia particularly in India through the Philippines and some parts of northern Australia. It would grow on different soil types and may reach 20 meters high and would bear up to a million flowers. It is one of the largest palms. It is slow growing and doesn't want to be disturbed once planted. It would require an abundance of sunlight and much water. Like all the Corypha family, it only flowers once during maturity and dies after.

== See also ==
- Tapioca pearl
- Agar
- Filipino cuisine
  - List of Philippine desserts
