= Ginisang munggo =

Filipino savory mung bean soup

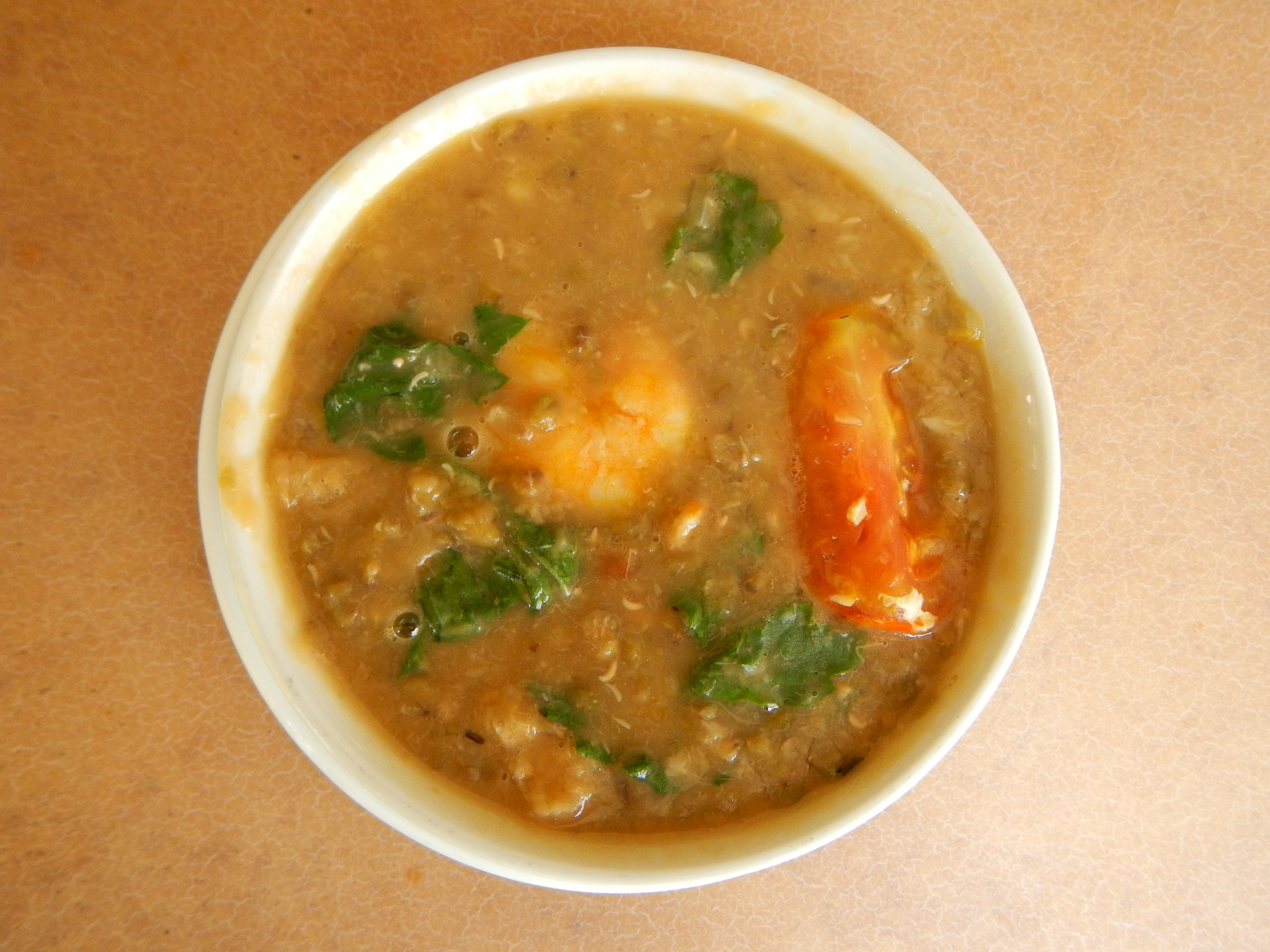
- Ginisang munggo with shrimp
- Alternative names: Ginisang monggo, Balatung
- Course: Main dish
- Place of origin: Philippines
- Created by: Filipino cuisine
- Serving temperature: Hot
- Main ingredients: Mung beans, garlic, onions, tomatoes, fish sauce, meat, seafood
- Variations: Ginisang monggo sa gata

Ginisang munggo is a Filipino savory mung bean soup. It is made with mung beans, garlic, tomatoes, onions, various vegetables, and patis (fish sauce). It is cooked with pork, tinapa (smoked fish), daing (dried fish), or other seafood and meat. It is also commonly garnished with chicharon. The name means "sauteed mung bean", though the dish ends up being a soup. The name is in reference to the first step of the cooking process where the spices and the secondary ingredients are sauteed before water and the mung beans are added.

A variant of the dish includes coconut milk and is known as ginisang munggo sa gata. It should not be confused with ginataang munggo which is a dessert gruel made from glutinous rice and mung beans.

The dish may be cooked with Himbabao (Broussonetia luzonica) or Birch flower. In the vernacular its names include Alibabag, Ambabaay, Aplit, Babayan, Bulaloy, Bungon and Kama-a.

== See also ==
- Cuisine of the Philippines
