= Thagu byin =

Burmese sweet sago pudding

- Type: Snack (mont)
- Place of origin: Myanmar (Burma)
- Region or state: Southeast Asia
- Associated cuisine: Burmese
- Main ingredients: Sago; condensed milk; coconut milk; sugar
- Similar dishes: Sago pudding

Thagu byin (Burmese: သာဂူပြင်; pronounced [θàɡùbjɪ̀ɴ]; also spelt thagu pyin) is a traditional Burmese snack or mont. The sweet delicacy is essentially a sweet sago pudding made with sago, coconut milk and condensed milk. In recent years, thagu byin has seen a resurgence in popularity, as a packaged gift item.
