= Tapioca (disambiguation) =

Tapioca can mean:

- Tapioca, a food ingredient
  - Tapioca pudding, a food made using tapioca
- The plant from which the food is made, Manihot esculenta
- General Tapioca, a fictional character from The Adventures of Tintin
