= Ginataang munggo =

Filipino dessert

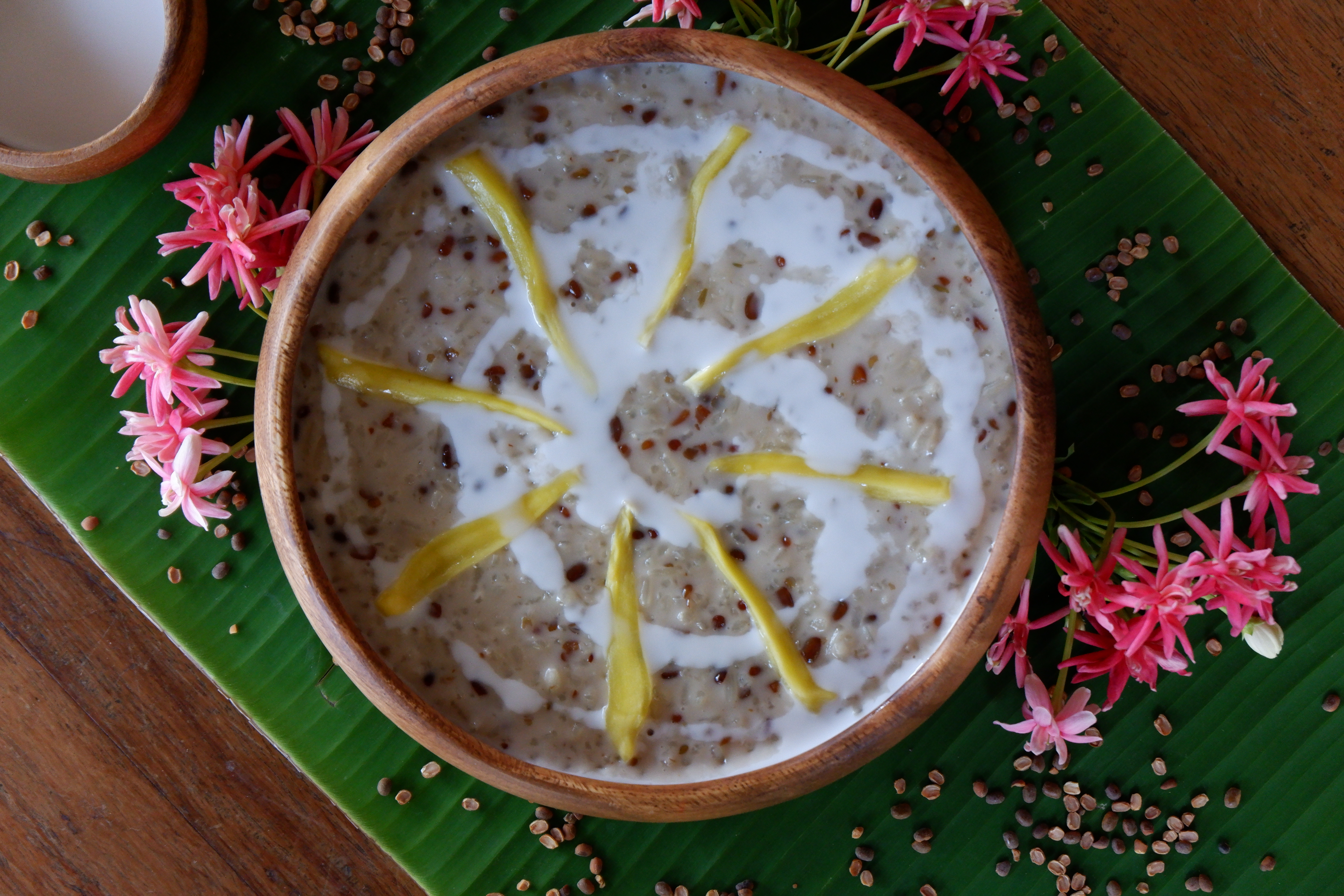
- Alternative names: Ginataang totong, Tinutungang munggo; Lelut balatung; Ginataang minatamis na munggo
- Course: Dessert
- Place of origin: Philippines
- Serving temperature: hot or cold
- Main ingredients: glutinous rice. mung bean, sugar, coconut milk

Ginataang munggo, also known as lelut balatung in Kapampangan or tinutungang munggo, is a Filipino glutinous rice porridge dessert with toasted mung beans, coconut milk, and sugar. It is typically flavored with vanilla or pandan leaves. Corn and fruits like jackfruit or banana may also be added. It is a type of lugaw and ginataan.

== See also ==
- Ginataang mais
- Ginataan
