= Ginataang mais =

Filipino sweet corn and rice gruel

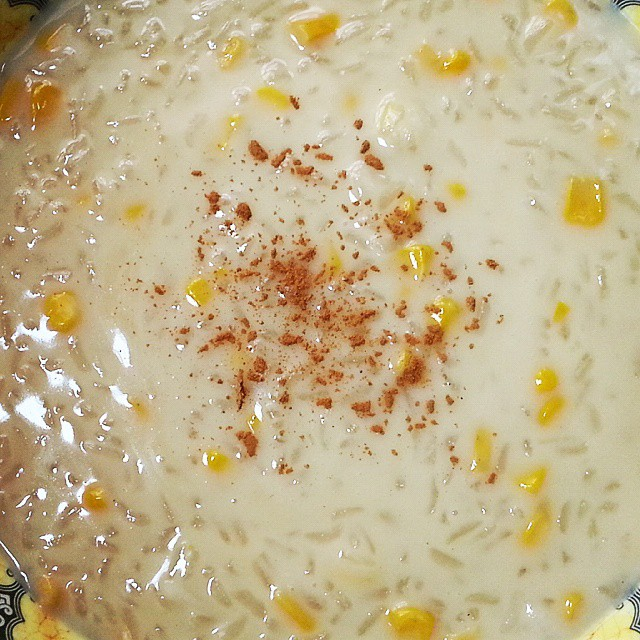
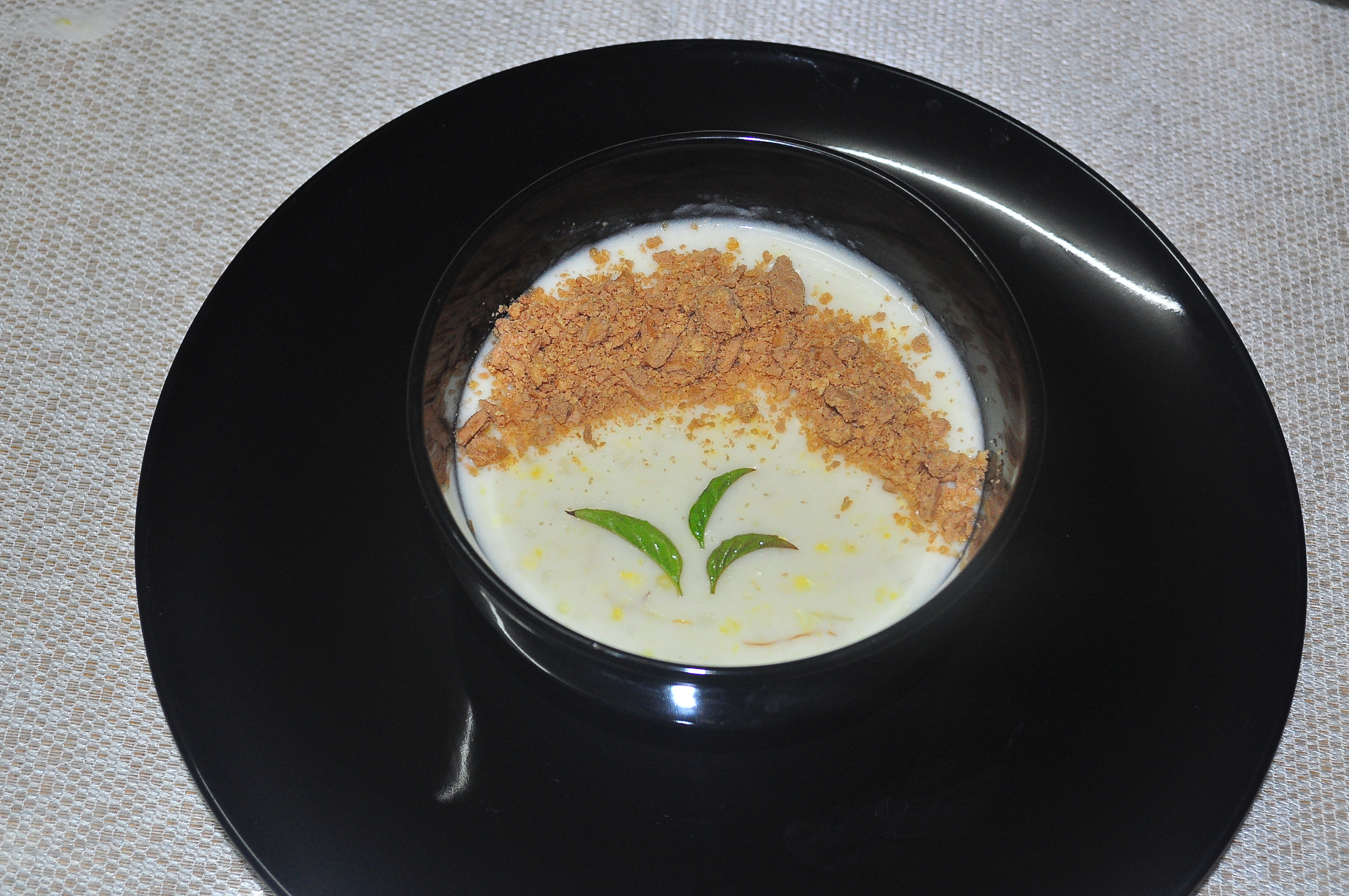
- Alternative names: Mais sa gata, lugaw na mais, lelut mais
- Course: Dessert
- Place of origin: The Philippines
- Serving temperature: Warm or cold
- Main ingredients: Sweet corn kernels, glutinous rice, coconut milk, sugar

Ginataang mais is a Filipino sweet corn and rice gruel. It is also known as lugaw na mais (Kapampangan: lelut mais). It is a type of dessert lugaw and ginataan. It is eaten warm in colder months, but may be eaten cold during summer. Ginataang mais means "corn in coconut milk" in Filipino.

Ginataang mais is made by boiling glutinous rice (malagkit) until almost done. Sweet corn, coconut milk (gata), and sugar are then added and the heat lowered shortly before the rice is fully cooked. In some recipes, coconut milk is added after cooking. Evaporated milk may be used in place of coconut milk. Other ingredients may be added including latik (coconut caramel), pinipig (pounded young rice kernels), jackfruit, fresh grated coconut, butter, and vanilla.

== See also ==
- Binaki
- Binatog
- Ginataang munggo
- Maíz con hielo
- Pozole
- List of maize dishes
