= Bilo-bilo =

Filipino dessert of small rice balls in coconut milk

Pinaltok/bilo-bilo
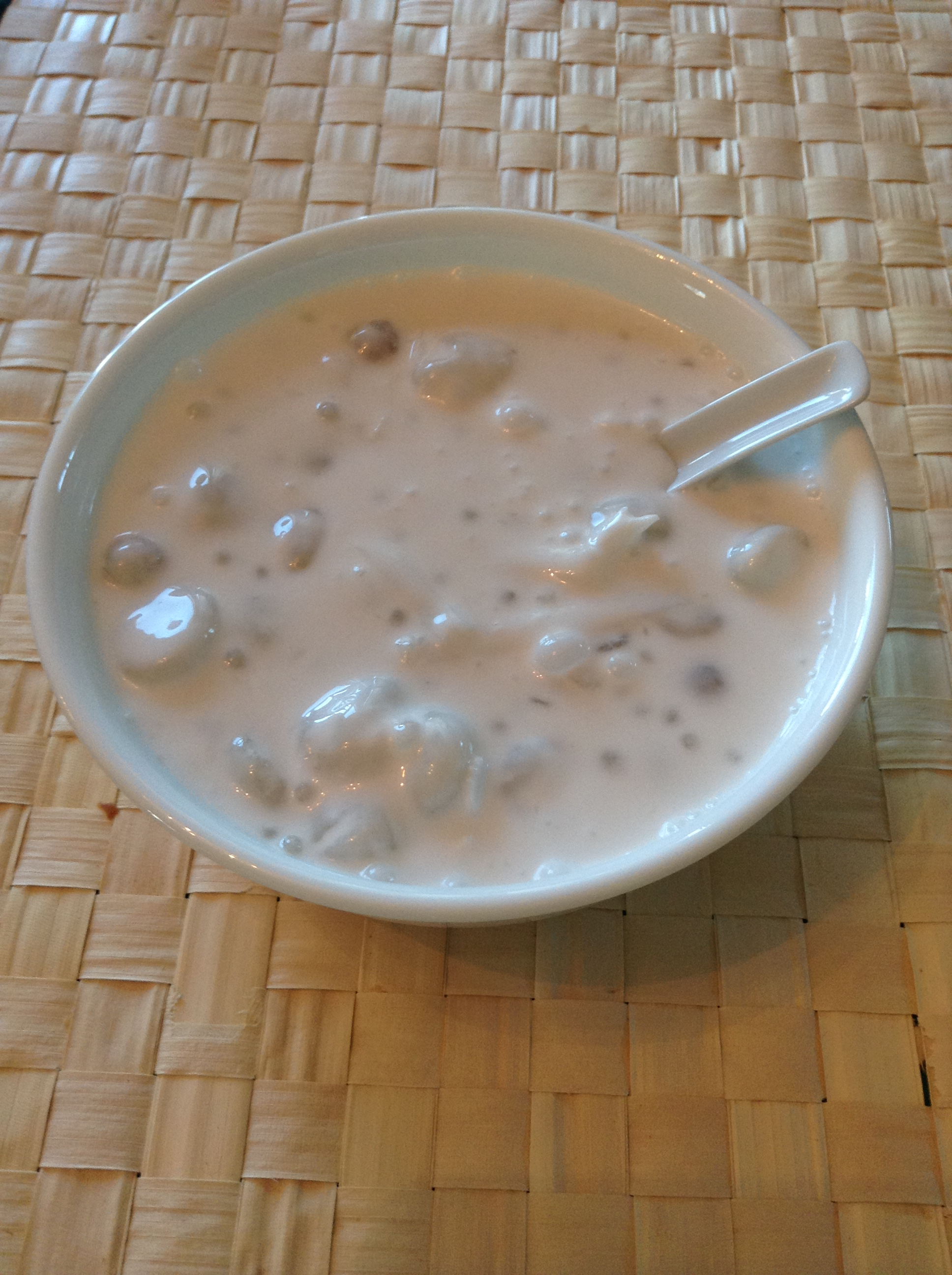
- Bilo-bilo
- Alternative names: bilu-bilo, pinaltok, binignit, paradusdos, pinindot, ginataang bilo-bilo, ginataang halo-halo, tambo-tambong
- Course: Dessert
- Place of origin: Philippines
- Serving temperature: Hot or cold
- Main ingredients: Sticky rice, coconut milk, sugar, saba, taro, sweet potato, pearl sago, landang, pandan leaves

Pinaltok or bilo-bilo is a Filipino dessert made of small glutinous balls (sweet sticky rice flour rounded up by adding water) in coconut milk and sugar. Then jackfruit, saba bananas, sweet potatoes, taro, and tapioca pearls or sago (regular and mini size pearls) are added. Bilo-bilo's origin is in Luzon. There are different recipe versions depending on what region in the Philippines it is from. Some recipes call for young coconut meat and some call for adding pandan leaves. This is usually and traditionally eaten hot while others prefer eating them cold after refrigeration.

== See also ==
- Halo-halo
- Sago pudding
