= Staple food =

Major portion of a standard diet

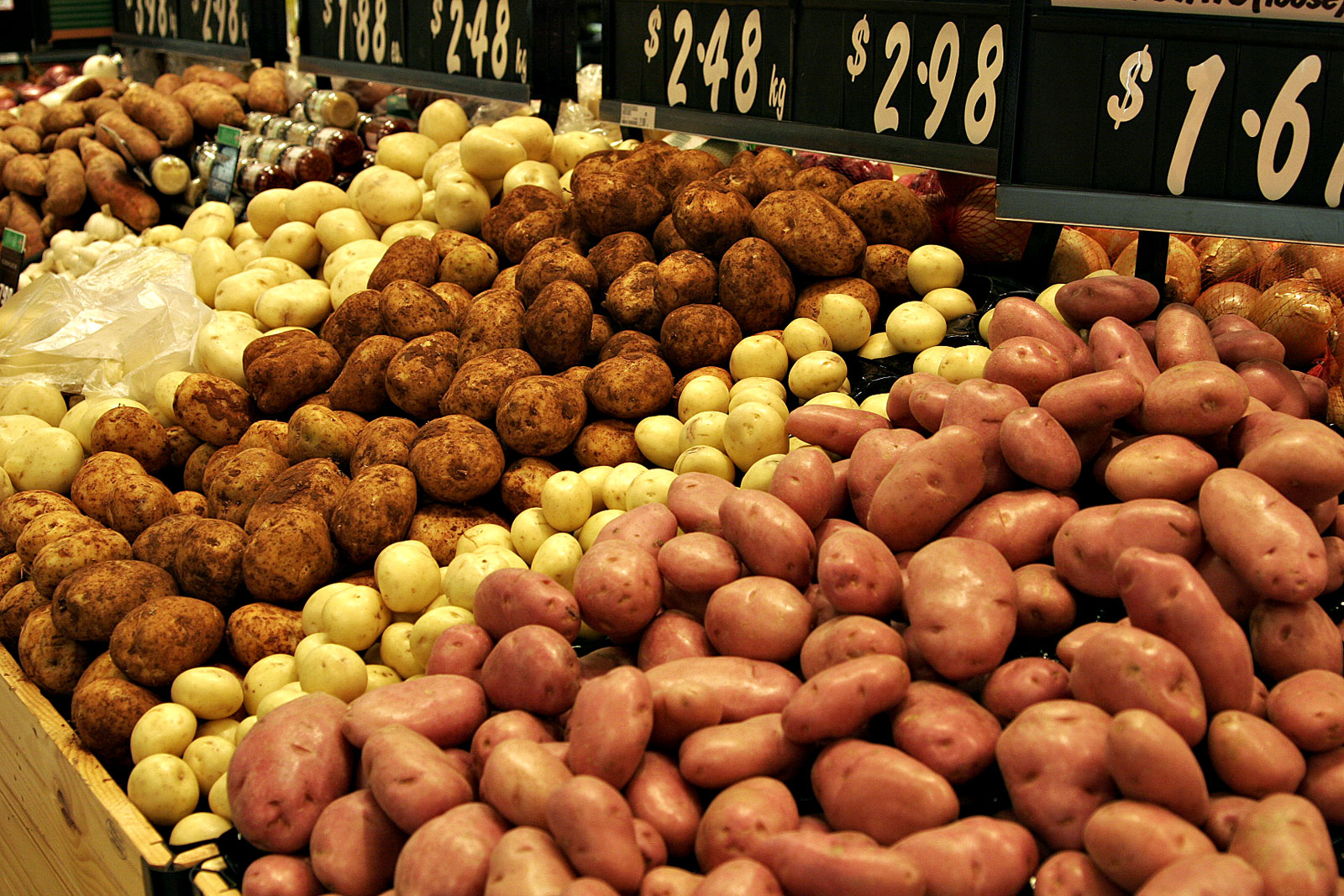
Various types of potato

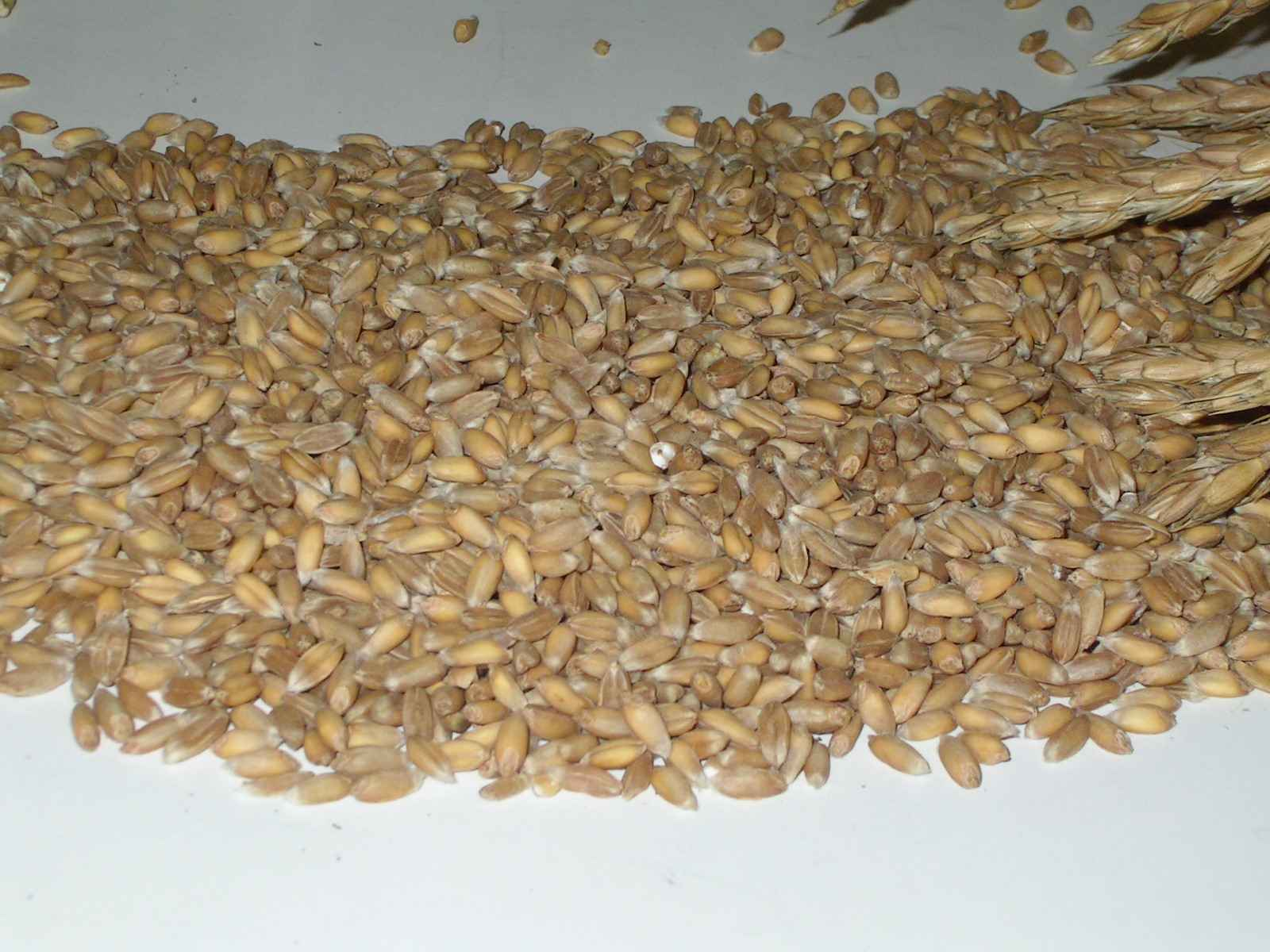
Unprocessed seeds of spelt, a historically important staple food

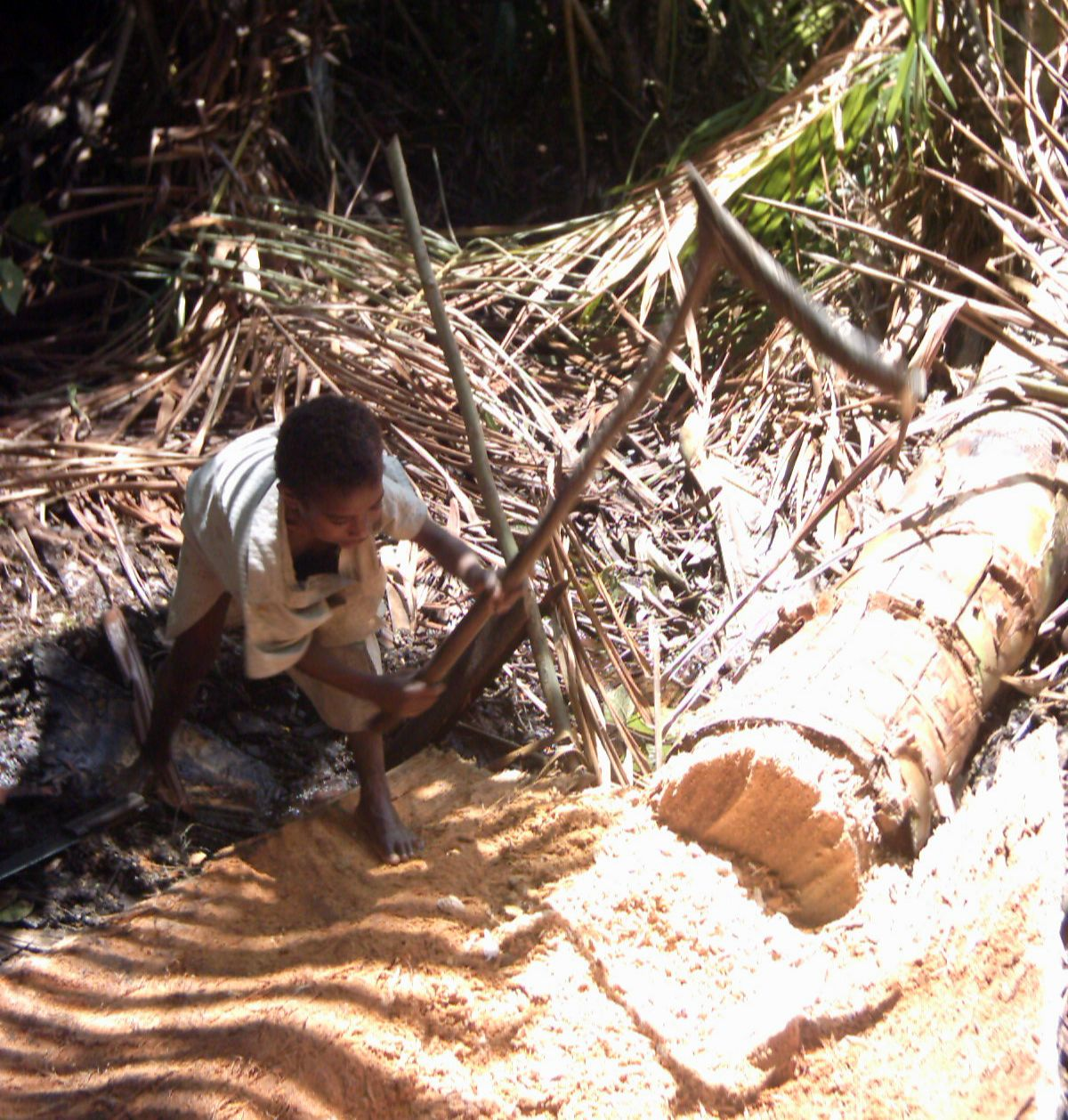
Harvesting sago pith to produce the starch in Papua New Guinea

A staple food, food staple, or simply staple, is a food that is eaten often and in such quantities that it constitutes a dominant portion of a standard diet for an individual or a population group, supplying a large fraction of energy needs and generally forming a significant proportion of the intake of other nutrients as well. For humans, a staple food of a specific society may be eaten as often as every day or every meal, and most people live on a diet based on just a small variety of food staples. Specific staples vary from place to place, but typically are inexpensive or readily available foods that supply one or more of the macronutrients and micronutrients needed for survival and health: carbohydrates, proteins, fats, minerals, and vitamins. Typical examples include grains (cereals and legumes), seeds, nuts, and root vegetables (tubers and roots). Among them, cereals (rice, wheat, oat, maize, etc.), legumes (lentils and beans), and tubers (e.g. potato, taro, and yam) account for about 90% of the world's food calorie intake.

Early agricultural civilizations valued the crop foods that they established as staples because, in addition to providing necessary nutrition, they are suitable for storage over long periods of time without decay. Such nonperishable foods are the only possible staples during seasons of shortage, such as dry seasons or cold temperate winters, against which times harvests have been stored. During seasons of surplus, wider choices of foods may be available.

== Type ==
Staple foods are derived from either plant or animal products that are digestible by humans and can be supplied in substantial quantities. Common plant-based staples include cereals (e.g. rice, wheat, maize, millet, barley, oats, rye, spelt, emmer, triticale and sorghum), starchy tubers (e.g. potato, sweet potato, yam and taro) or root vegetables (e.g. cassava, turnip, carrot, rutabagas) and dried legumes (lentils and beans). Animal-based staples include various types of meat (typically livestock and poultry), fish, eggs, milk and dairy products (e.g. cheese). Other staple foods include sago (derived from the pith of the sago palm tree), and large, fleshy fruits (e.g. breadfruit, breadnut, coconut, plantains, and gourds). Staple foods may also include processed food products (depending on the region) such as olive oil, coconut oil and sugar.

Generally, staple foods are those eaten in bulk that supply energy to humans, predominantly in the form of sugars and carbohydrates, and so are mainly plant-based, as meats and eggs are predominantly protein and fat, though dairy products provide all these. However, not all places are suitable for agriculture, and so pastoralism can be favoured instead, as it has the advantage that animals can live off of land unsuitable for agricultural crops and consume the local plant matter that is otherwise inedible to humans and convert that into—meat, offal, fat, eggs and milk—that humans can eat. Animals can therefore provide staples to human diets in inhospitable ecosystems such as deserts, steppe, taiga, tundra and mountainous terrains. Specific examples include herding in regions such as Mongolia where sheep are herded, the prairies where the Sioux herded bison, and the Arctic, where the Sami people herd reindeer.

== Demographics ==
The dominant staple foods in different parts of the world are a function of weather patterns, local terrain, farming constraints, acquired tastes and ecosystems. For example, the main energy source staples in the average African diet are cereals (46 percent), roots and tubers (20 percent) and animal products (7 percent). In Western Europe, the main staples in the average diet are animal products (33 percent), cereals (26 percent) and roots and tubers (4 percent).

Most of the human population lives on a diet based on one or more of the following staples: cereals (rice, wheat, maize (corn), millet and sorghum), roots and tubers (potatoes, cassava, yams and taro) and animal products such as meat, milk, eggs, cheese and fish. Regional staples include the plants rye, soybeans, barley, oats and teff.

Just 15 plant crops provide 90 percent of the world's food energy intake (exclusive of meat), with rice, maize and wheat comprising two-thirds of human food consumption. These three are the staples of about 80 percent of the world population, and rice feeds almost half of humanity.

Roots and tubers, meanwhile, are important staples for over one billion people in the developing world, accounting for roughly 40 percent of the food eaten by half the population of sub-Saharan Africa. Roots and tubers are high in carbohydrates, calcium and vitamin C, but low in protein. Cassava root, for example, is a major food staple in the developing world, a basic food source for around 500 million people.

With economic development and free trade, many countries have shifted away from low-nutrient-density staple foods to higher-nutrient-density staples, as well as towards greater meat consumption.

Some foods like quinoa—a pseudocereal grain that originally came from the Andes—were also staples centuries ago. Oca tubers, ulluku tubers and grain amaranth are other foods that may have been historical Andean staples. Pemmican made from dried meat and fat was a staple of the Plains Indians of North America.

== Production ==
Most staple foods are currently produced using modern, conventional farming practices. However, the production of staple food using organic farming methods is growing.

Ten staple foods of global importance (ranked by annual production)
		World production, 2012	Average world yield, 2010	World's most productive countries, 2012		World's largest producing countries, 2013	
Rank	Crop	(tonnes)	(tonnes per hectare)	(tonnes per hectare)	Country	(tonnes)	Country
1	Maize (Corn)	873 million	5.1	11.1	United States	354 million	United States
2	Rice	738 million	4.3	9.5	Egypt	204 million	China
3	Wheat	671 million	3.1	8.9	New Zealand	122 million	China
4	Potatoes	365 million	17.2	45.4	Netherlands	96 million	China
5	Cassava	269 million	12.5	34.8	Indonesia	47 million	Nigeria
6	Soybeans	241 million	2.4	4.4	Egypt	91 million	United States
7	Sweet potatoes	108 million	13.5	33.3	Senegal	71 million	China
8	Yams	59.5 million	10.5	28.3	Colombia	36 million	Nigeria
9	Sorghum	57.0 million	1.5	4.5	United States	10 million	United States
10	Plantain	37.2 million	6.3	31.1	El Salvador	9 million	Uganda

== Processing ==
Rice is most commonly cooked and eaten as separate entire grains, but most other staple cereals are milled into a flour or meal that can be used to make bread, noodles, pasta, porridge and mushes like mealie pap (although both can be eaten either as grains or ground into flour). Root vegetables can be mashed and used to make porridge-like dishes such as poi and fufu. Pulses (such as chickpeas, from which gram flour is made) and starchy root vegetables (such as canna rhizomes) can also be made into flour.

== Nutrition ==
Consumed in isolation, staple foods do not provide the full range of essential nutrients. The nutrient-deficiency disease pellagra is associated with a diet consisting primarily of maize, while the disease beriberi is associated with a diet of refined white rice. Scurvy can result from a lack of vitamin C, also known as ascorbic acid. One author indicated that the nutritional value of some staple foods are negatively affected by higher levels of carbon dioxide, as occurs in climate change.

=== Comparison of 10 staple foods ===
The following table shows the nutrient content of 10 major staple vegetable foods in raw form on a dry weight basis to account for their different water contents. Raw grains are not edible and cannot be digested, so they must be cooked, sprouted or otherwise prepared for human consumption. In sprouted and cooked form, the relative nutritional and anti-nutritional contents of each of these grains are different from that of the raw form of these grains, as shown. Potatoes also must be cooked, but should not be sprouted. The highlighted values show the highest nutrient density among these 10 staples. Other foods, consumed in smaller quantities, may have nutrient densities different from these values.

Nutrient content of 10 major staple foods per 100 g dry mass
Staple	Maize (corn)^{[A]}	Rice, white^{[B]}	Wheat^{[C]}	Potatoes^{[D]}	Cassava^{[E]}	Soybeans, green^{[F]}	Sweet potatoes^{[G]}	Yams^{[Y]}	Sorghum^{[H]}	Plantain^{[Z]}	RDA
Water content (%)	10	12	13	79	60	68	77	70	9	65	
Raw grams per 100 g dry mass	111	114	115	476	250	313	435	333	110	286	
Nutrient											
Energy (kJ)	1698	1736	1574	1533	1675	1922	1565	1647	1559	1460	8,368–10,460
Protein (g)	10.4	8.1	14.5	9.5	3.5	40.6	7.0	5.0	12.4	3.7	50
Fat (g)	5.3	0.8	1.8	0.4	0.7	21.6	0.2	0.6	3.6	1.1	44–77
Carbohydrates (g)	82	91	82	81	95	34	87	93	82	91	130
Fiber (g)	8.1	1.5	14.0	10.5	4.5	13.1	13.0	13.7	6.9	6.6	30
Sugar (g)	0.7	0.1	0.5	3.7	4.3	0.0	18.2	1.7	0.0	42.9	minimal
Minerals	^{[A]}	^{[B]}	^{[C]}	^{[D]}	^{[E]}	^{[F]}	^{[G]}	^{[Y]}	^{[H]}	^{[Z]}	RDA
Calcium (mg)	8	32	33	57	40	616	130	57	31	9	1,000
Iron (mg)	3.01	0.91	3.67	3.71	0.68	11.09	2.65	1.80	4.84	1.71	8
Magnesium (mg)	141	28	145	110	53	203	109	70	0	106	400
Phosphorus (mg)	233	131	331	271	68	606	204	183	315	97	700
Potassium (mg)	319	131	417	2005	678	1938	1465	2720	385	1426	4700
Sodium (mg)	39	6	2	29	35	47	239	30	7	11	1,500
Zinc (mg)	2.46	1.24	3.05	1.38	0.85	3.09	1.30	0.80	0.00	0.40	11
Copper (mg)	0.34	0.25	0.49	0.52	0.25	0.41	0.65	0.60	-	0.23	0.9
Manganese (mg)	0.54	1.24	4.59	0.71	0.95	1.72	1.13	1.33	-	-	2.3
Selenium (μg)	17.2	17.2	81.3	1.4	1.8	4.7	2.6	2.3	0.0	4.3	55
Vitamins	^{[A]}	^{[B]}	^{[C]}	^{[D]}	^{[E]}	^{[F]}	^{[G]}	^{[Y]}	^{[H]}	^{[Z]}	RDA
Vitamin C (mg)	0.0	0.0	0.0	93.8	51.5	90.6	10.4	57.0	0.0	52.6	90
Thiamin (B1) (mg)	0.43	0.08	0.34	0.38	0.23	1.38	0.35	0.37	0.26	0.14	1.2
Riboflavin (B2) (mg)	0.22	0.06	0.14	0.14	0.13	0.56	0.26	0.10	0.15	0.14	1.3
Niacin (B3) (mg)	4.03	1.82	6.28	5.00	2.13	5.16	2.43	1.83	3.22	1.97	16
Pantothenic acid (B5) (mg)	0.47	1.15	1.09	1.43	0.28	0.47	3.48	1.03	-	0.74	5
Vitamin B6 (mg)	0.69	0.18	0.34	1.43	0.23	0.22	0.91	0.97	-	0.86	1.3
Folate Total (B9) (μg)	21	9	44	76	68	516	48	77	0	63	400
Vitamin A (IU)	238	0	10	10	33	563	4178	460	0	3220	5000
Vitamin E, α-tocopherol (mg)	0.54	0.13	1.16	0.05	0.48	0.00	1.13	1.30	0.00	0.40	15
Vitamin K1 (μg)	0.3	0.1	2.2	9.0	4.8	0.0	7.8	8.7	0.0	2.0	120
Beta-carotene (μg)	108	0	6	5	20	0	36996	277	0	1306	10500
Lutein+zeaxanthin (μg)	1506	0	253	38	0	0	0	0	0	86	6000
Fats	^{[A]}	^{[B]}	^{[C]}	^{[D]}	^{[E]}	^{[F]}	^{[G]}	^{[Y]}	^{[H]}	^{[Z]}	RDA
Saturated (g)	0.74	0.20	0.30	0.14	0.18	2.47	0.09	0.13	0.51	0.40	minimal
Monounsaturated (g)	1.39	0.24	0.23	0.00	0.20	4.00	0.00	0.03	1.09	0.09	22–55
Polyunsaturated (g)	2.40	0.20	0.72	0.19	0.13	10.00	0.04	0.27	1.51	0.20	13–19
	^{[A]}	^{[B]}	^{[C]}	^{[D]}	^{[E]}	^{[F]}	^{[G]}	^{[Y]}	^{[H]}	^{[Z]}	RDA

^{A} raw yellow dent corn
^{B} raw unenriched long-grain white rice
^{C} raw hard red winter wheat
^{D} raw potato with flesh and skin
^{E} raw cassava
^{F} raw green soybeans
^{G} raw sweet potato
^{H} raw sorghum
^{Y} raw yam
^{Z} raw plantains
^{/*} unofficial

== Images ==
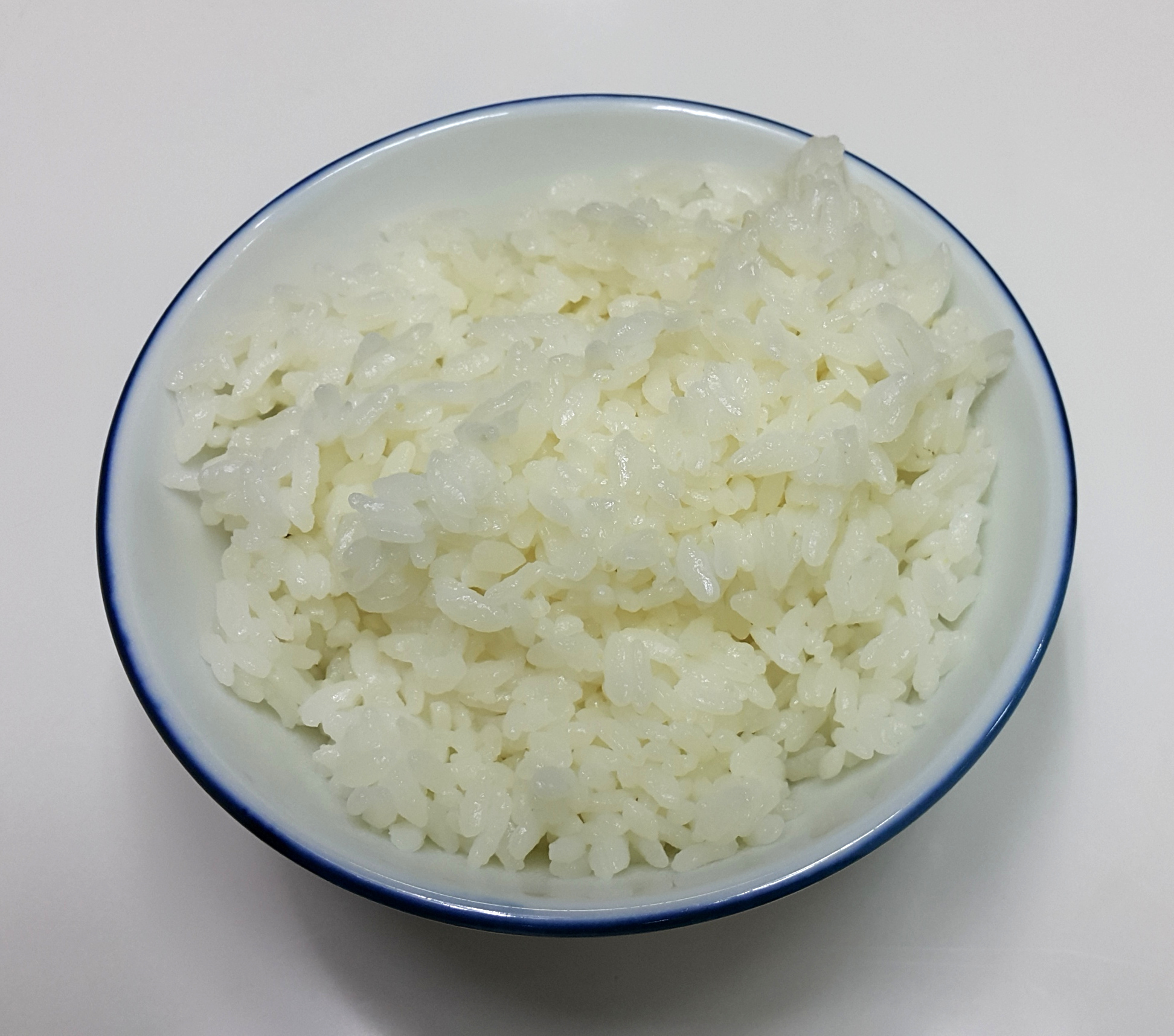
White rice, cooked

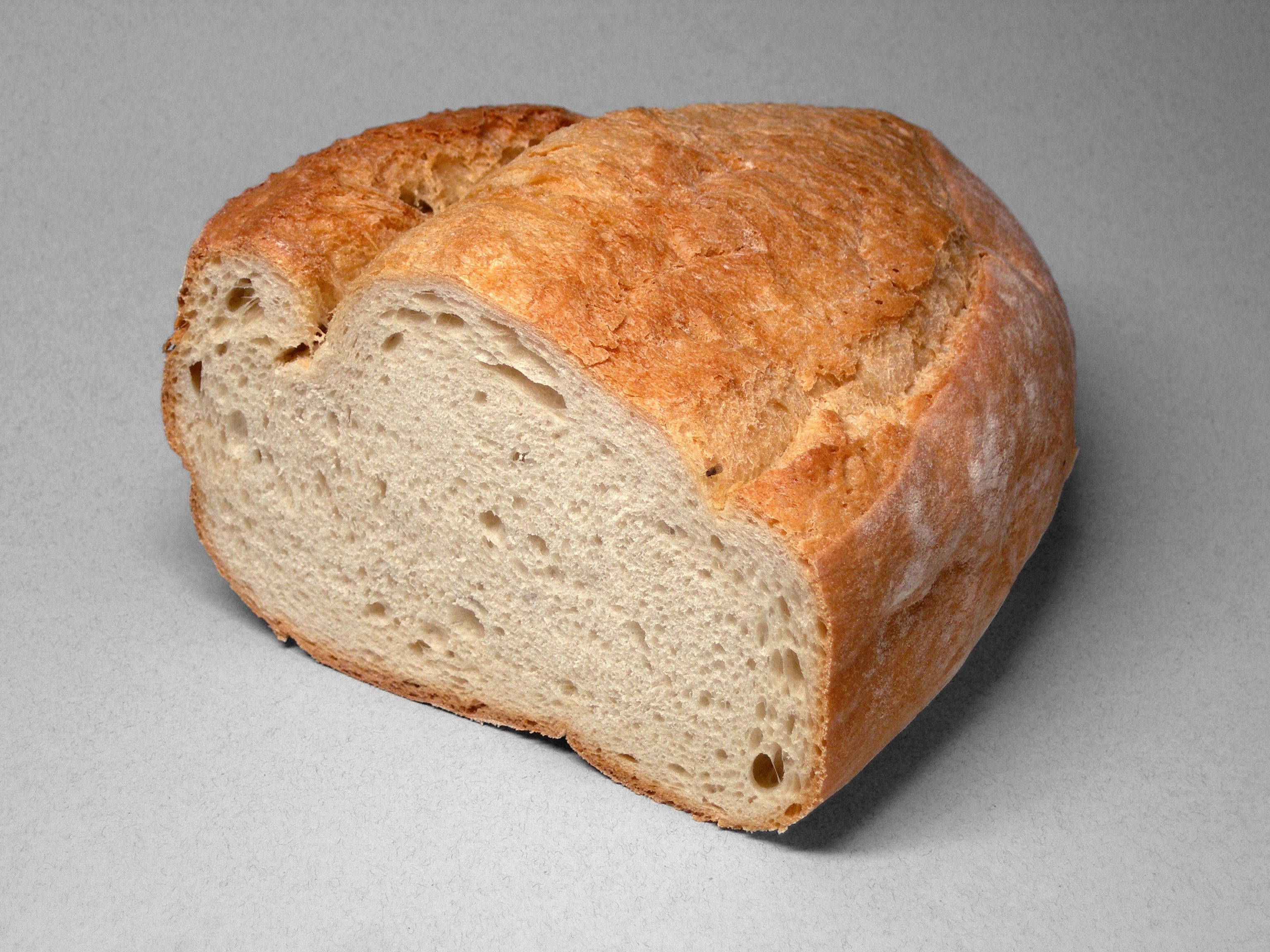
Bread made from wheat flour

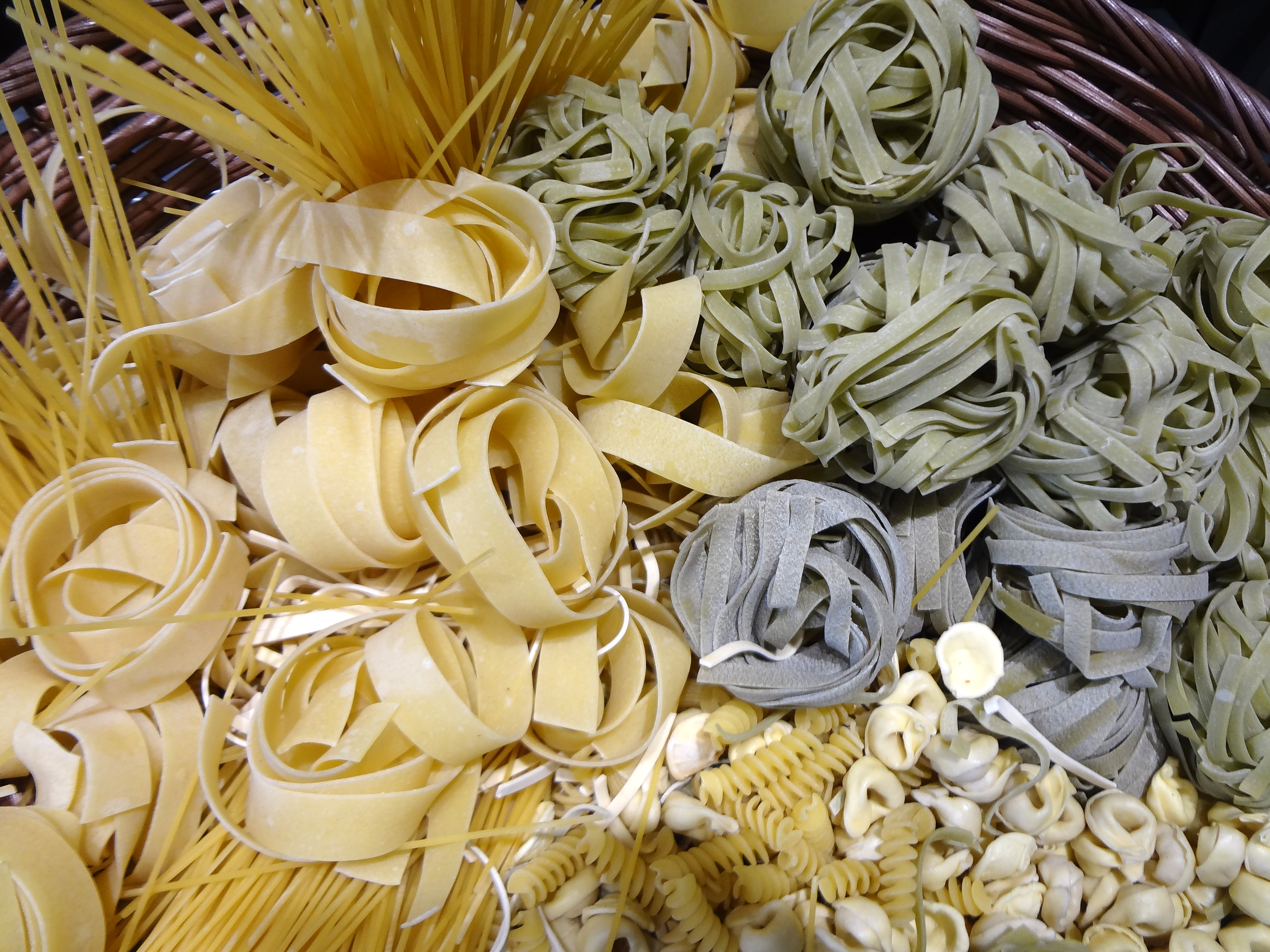
Pasta

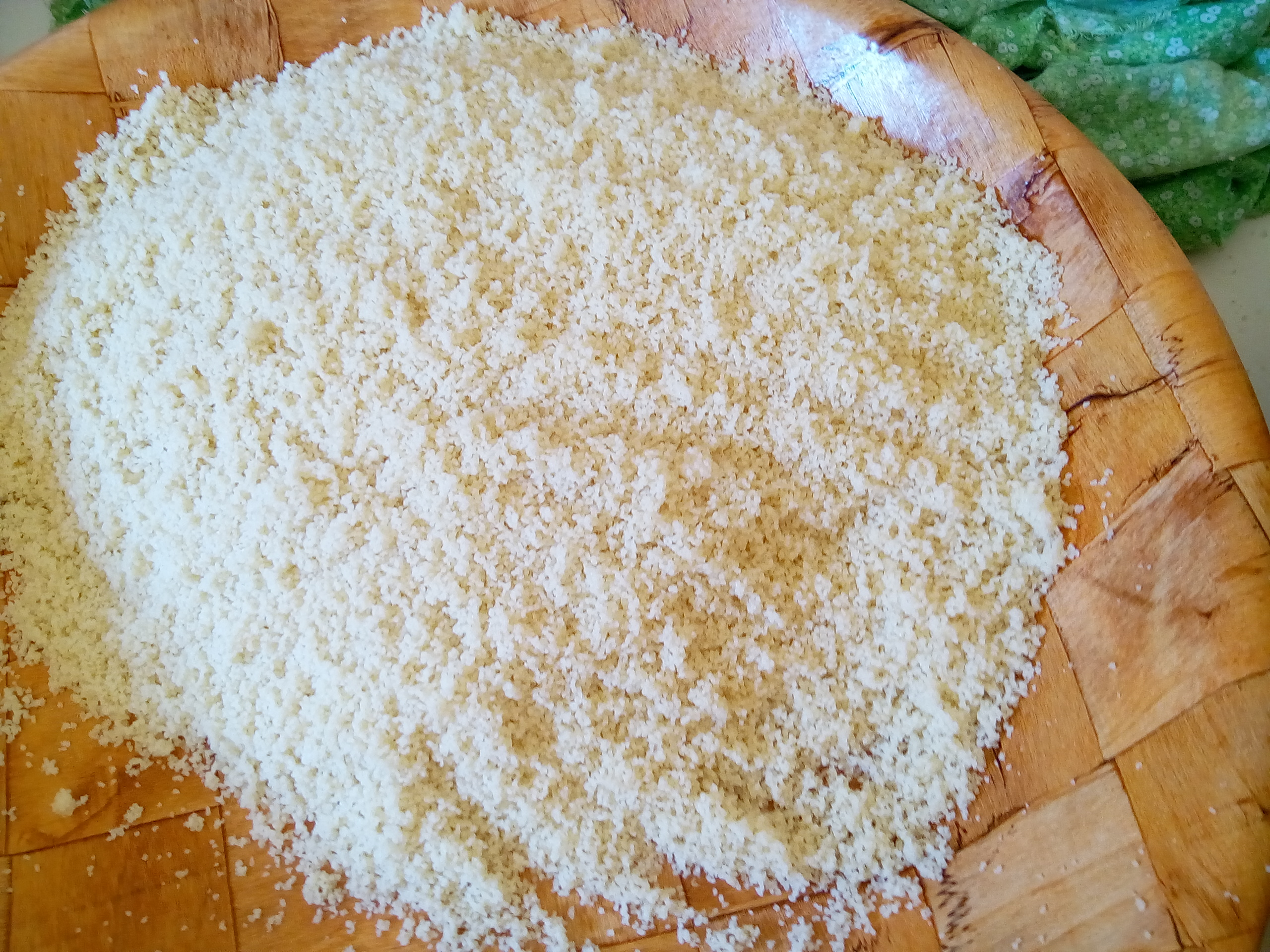
Couscous

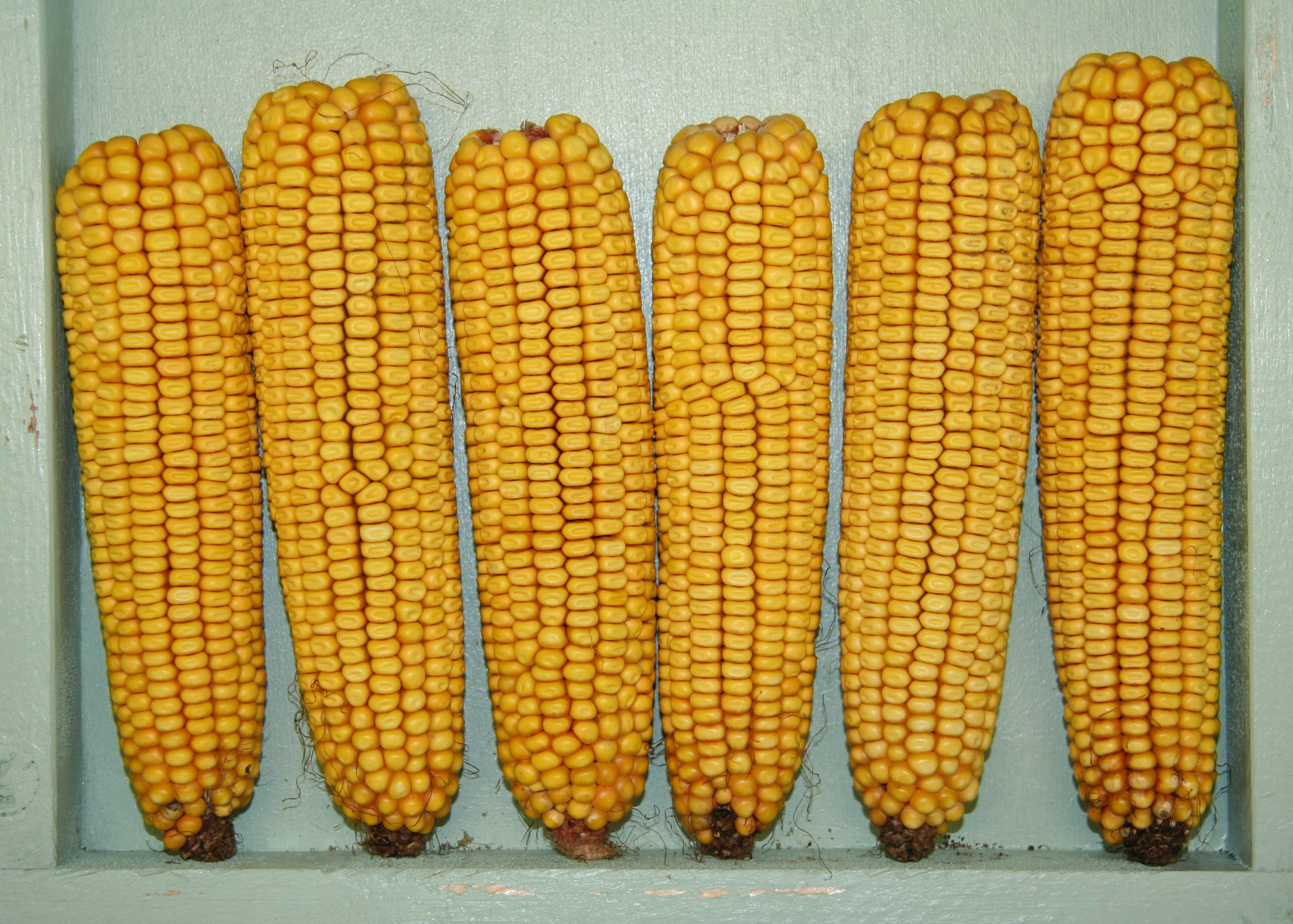
Maize (corn)

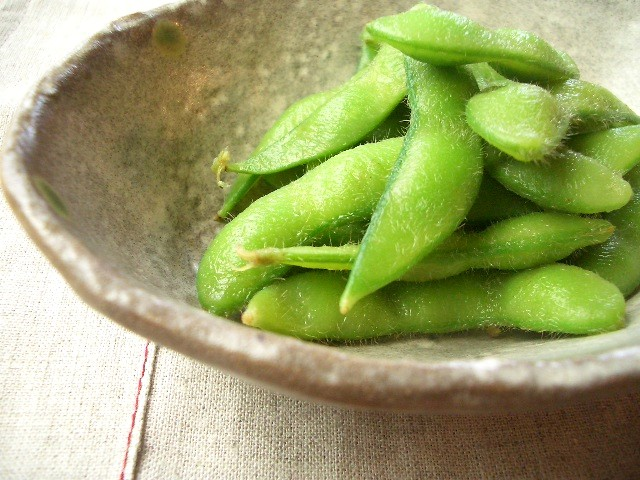
Edamame (green soybeans)

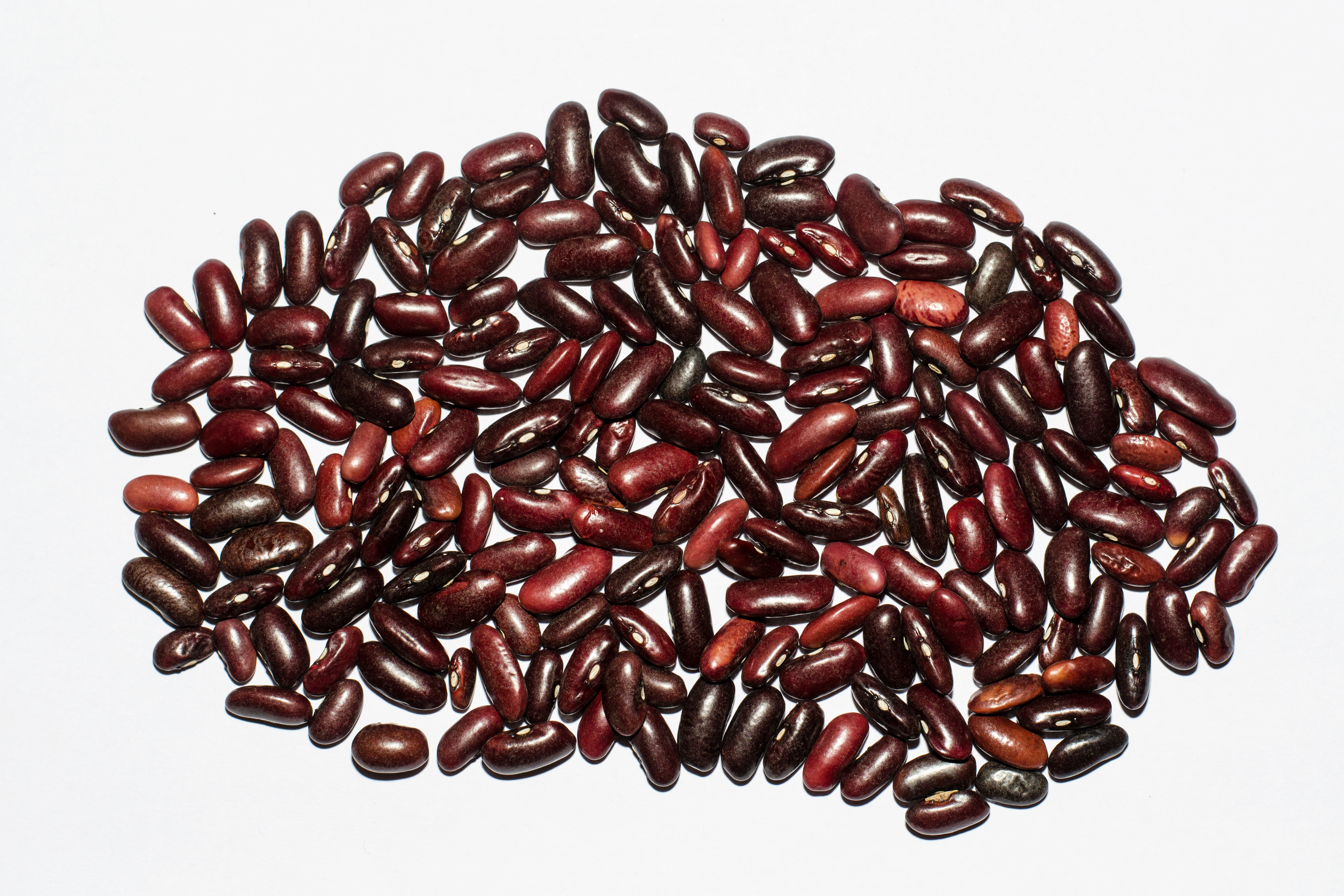
Kidney beans

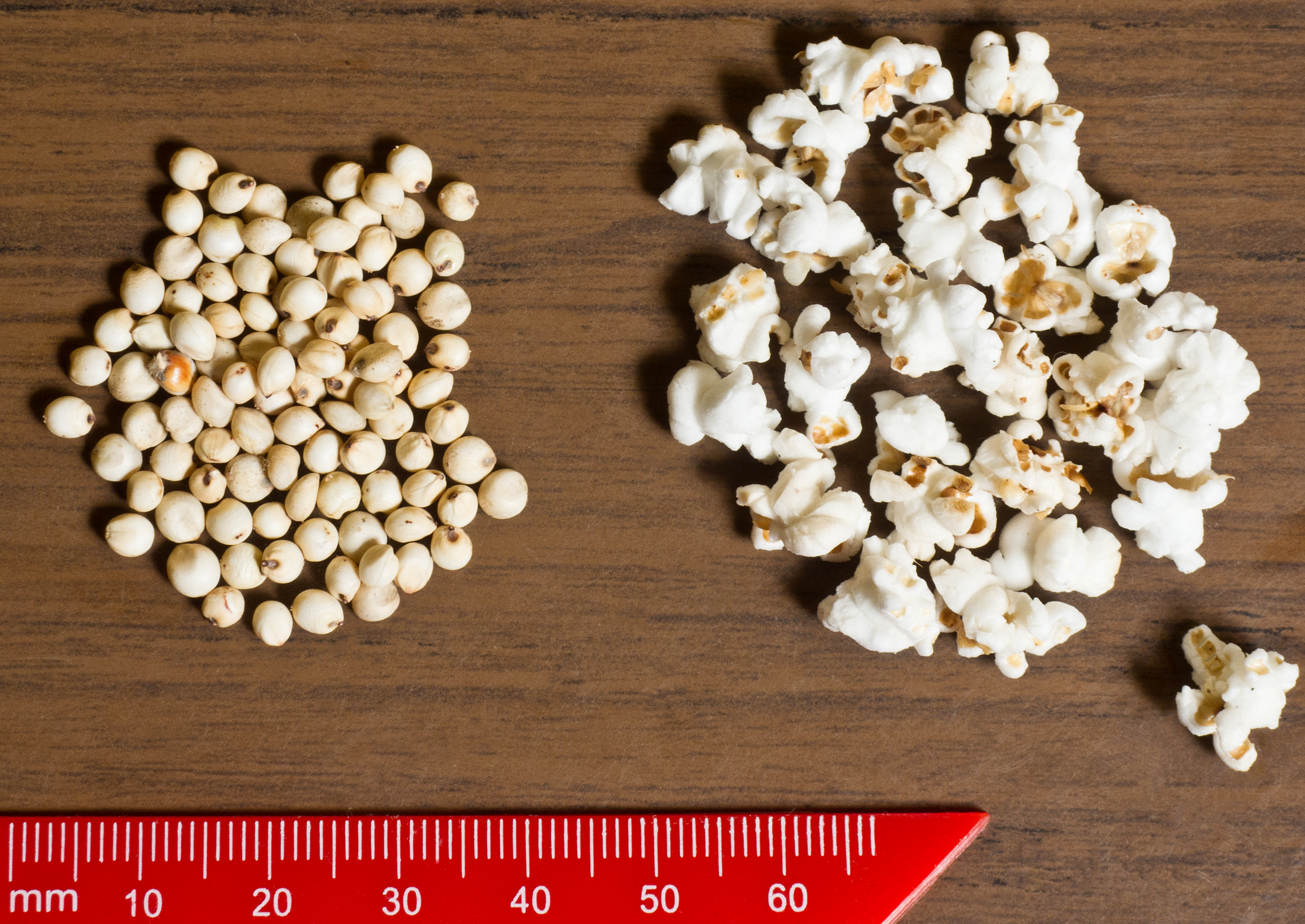
Sorghum seeds and popped sorghum

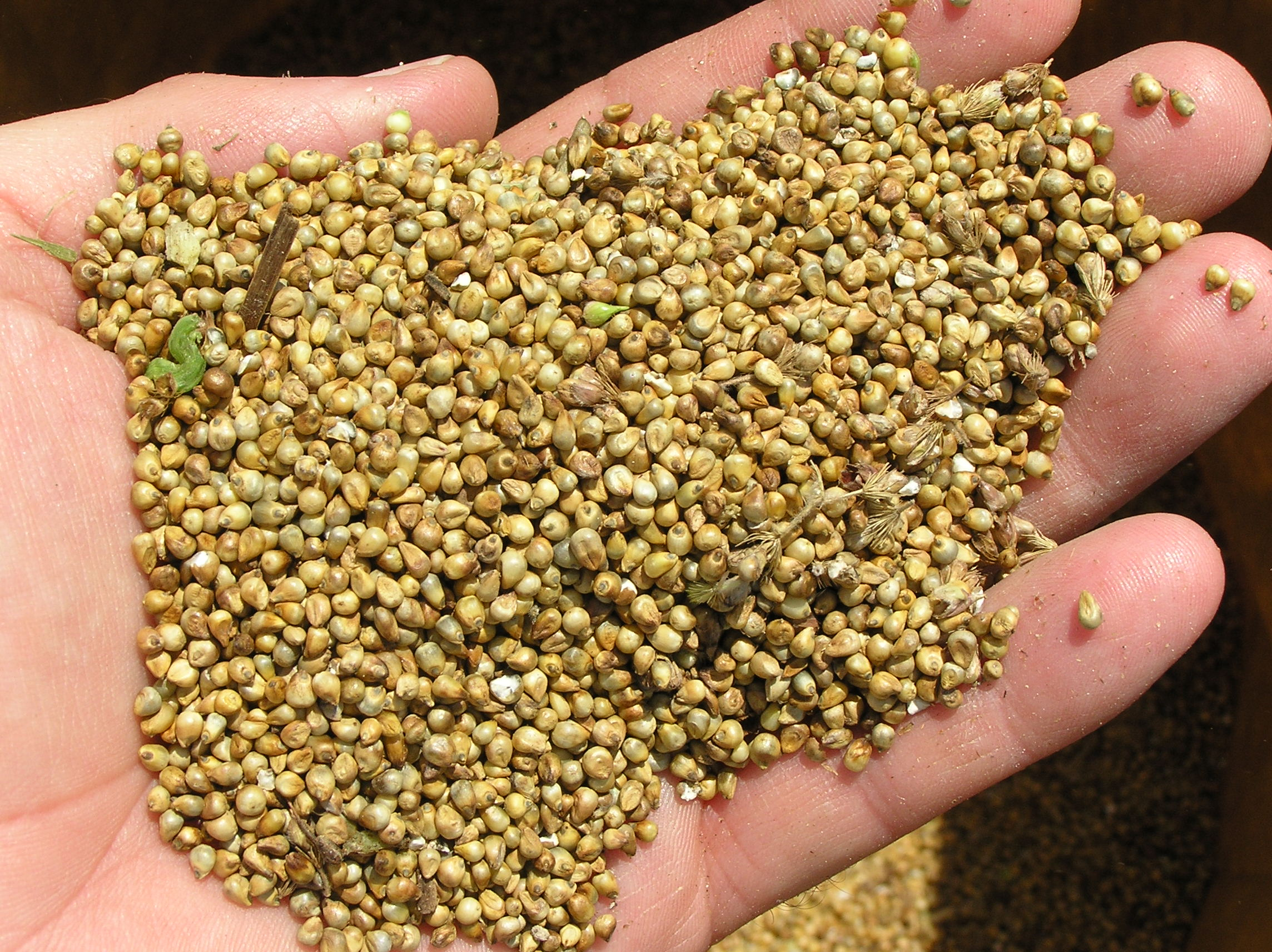
Millet grains

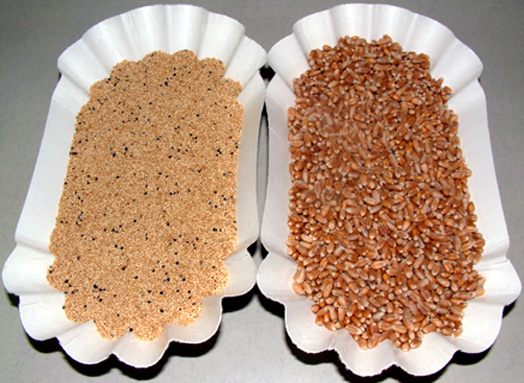
Amaranth (left) and common wheat berries

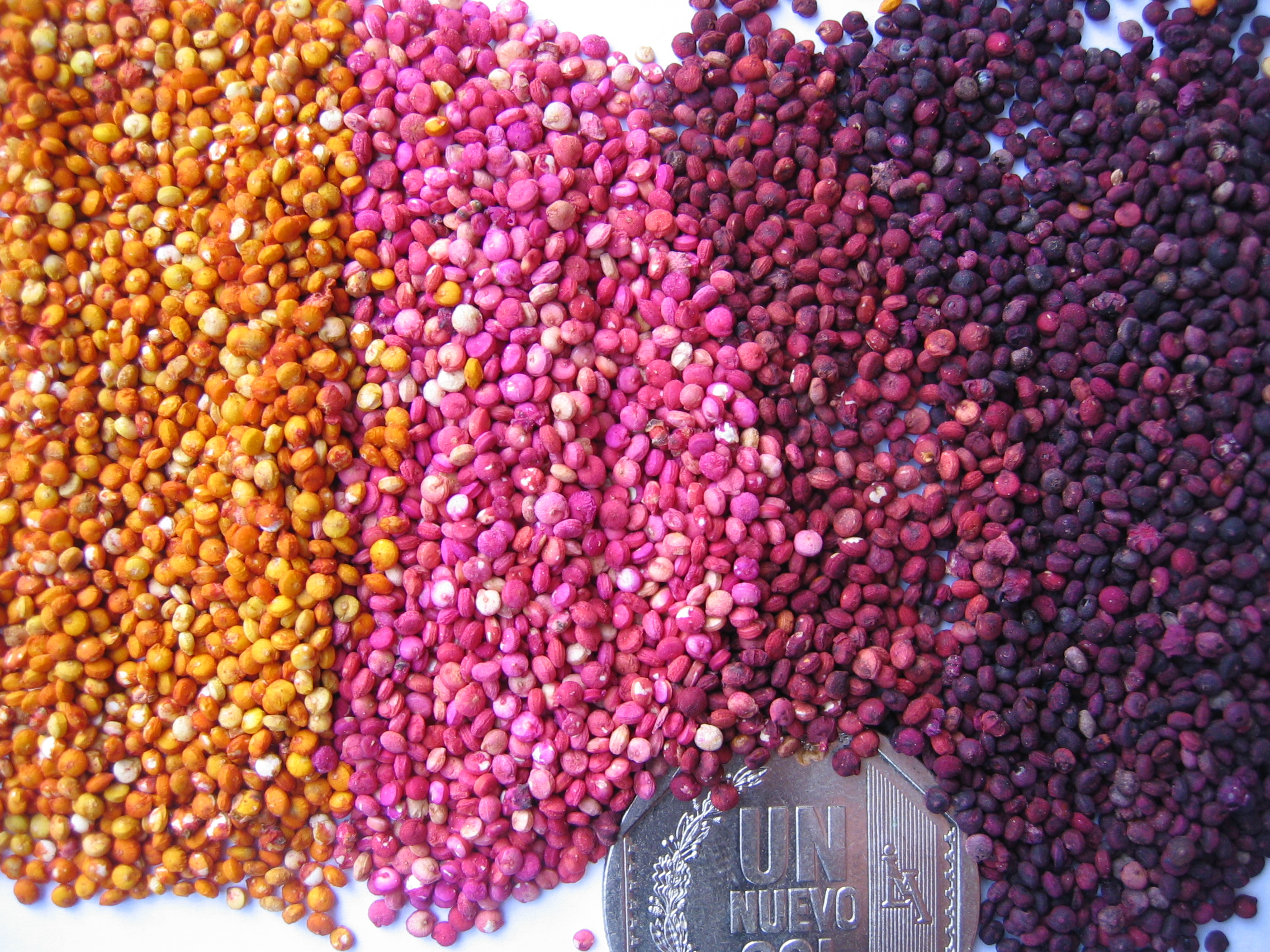
Colored quinoa

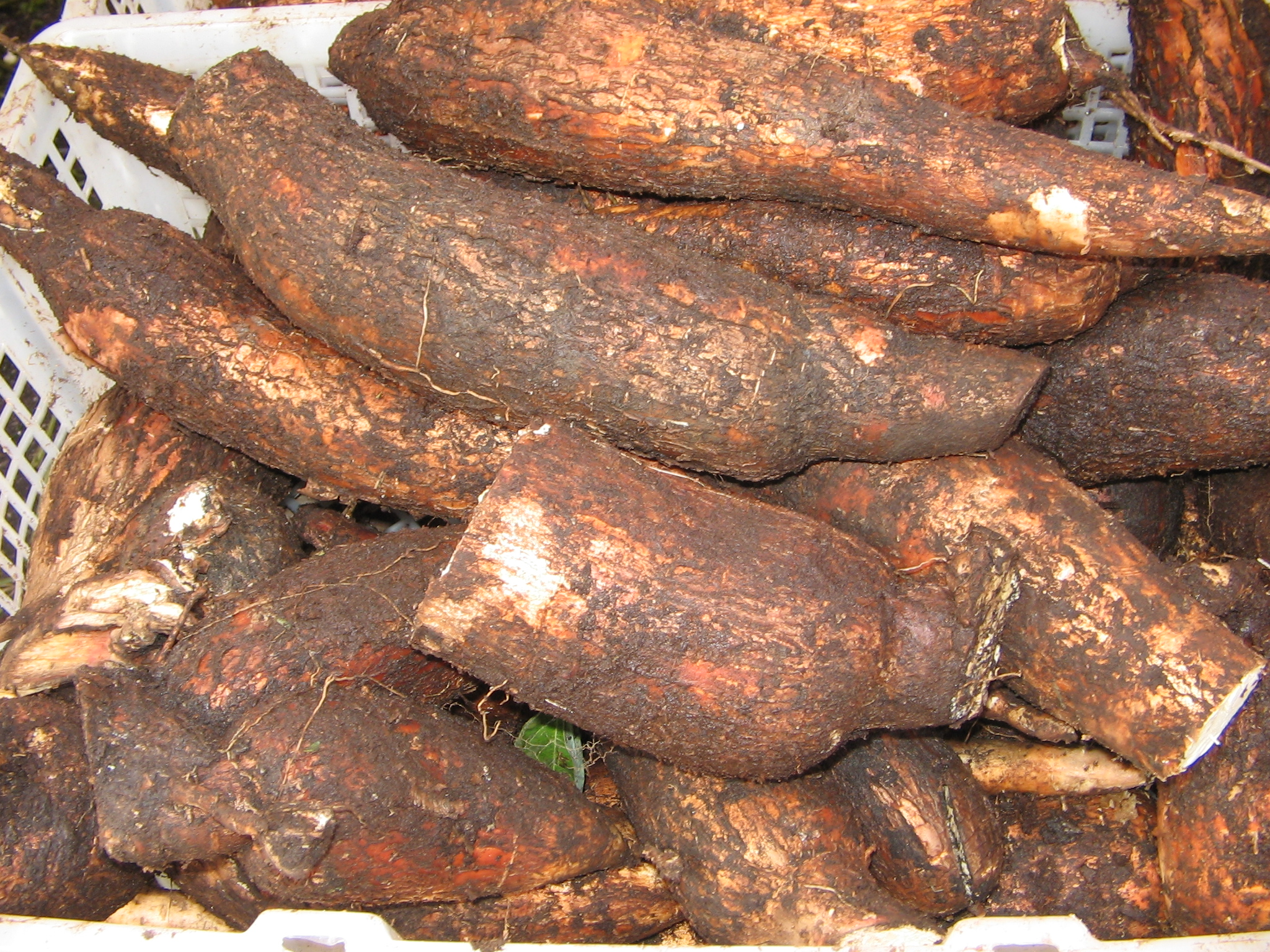
Cassava roots

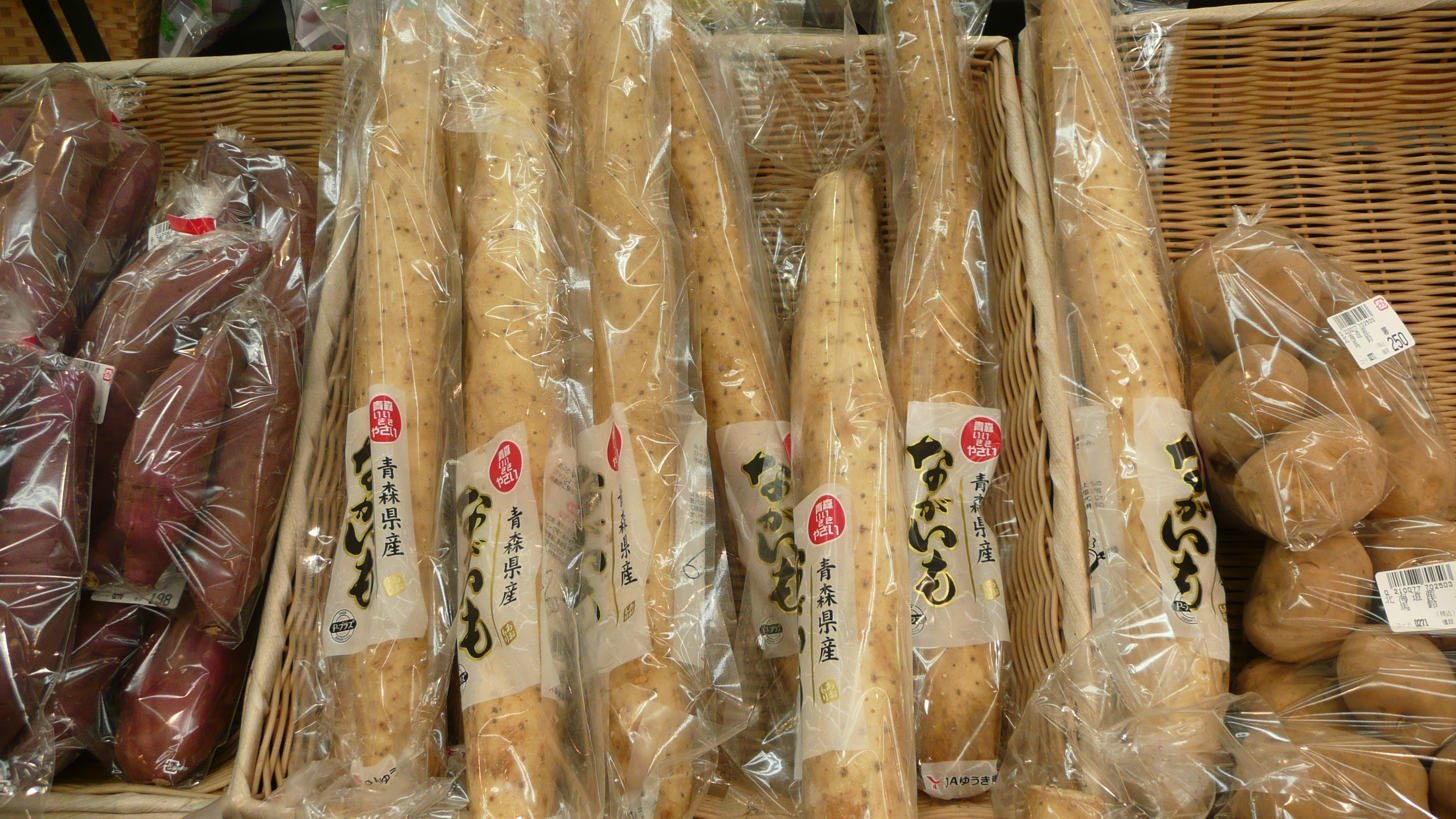
Chinese yams

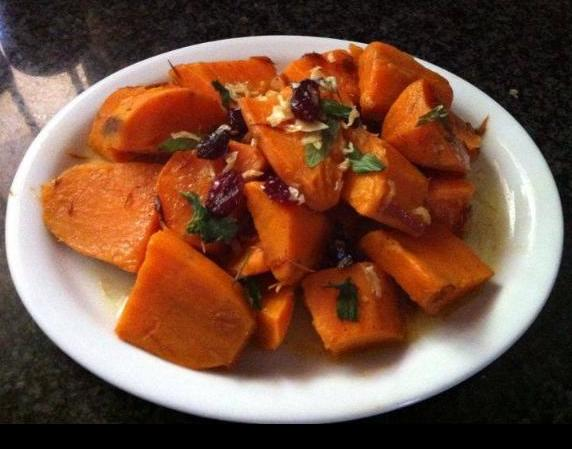
Sweet potato salad

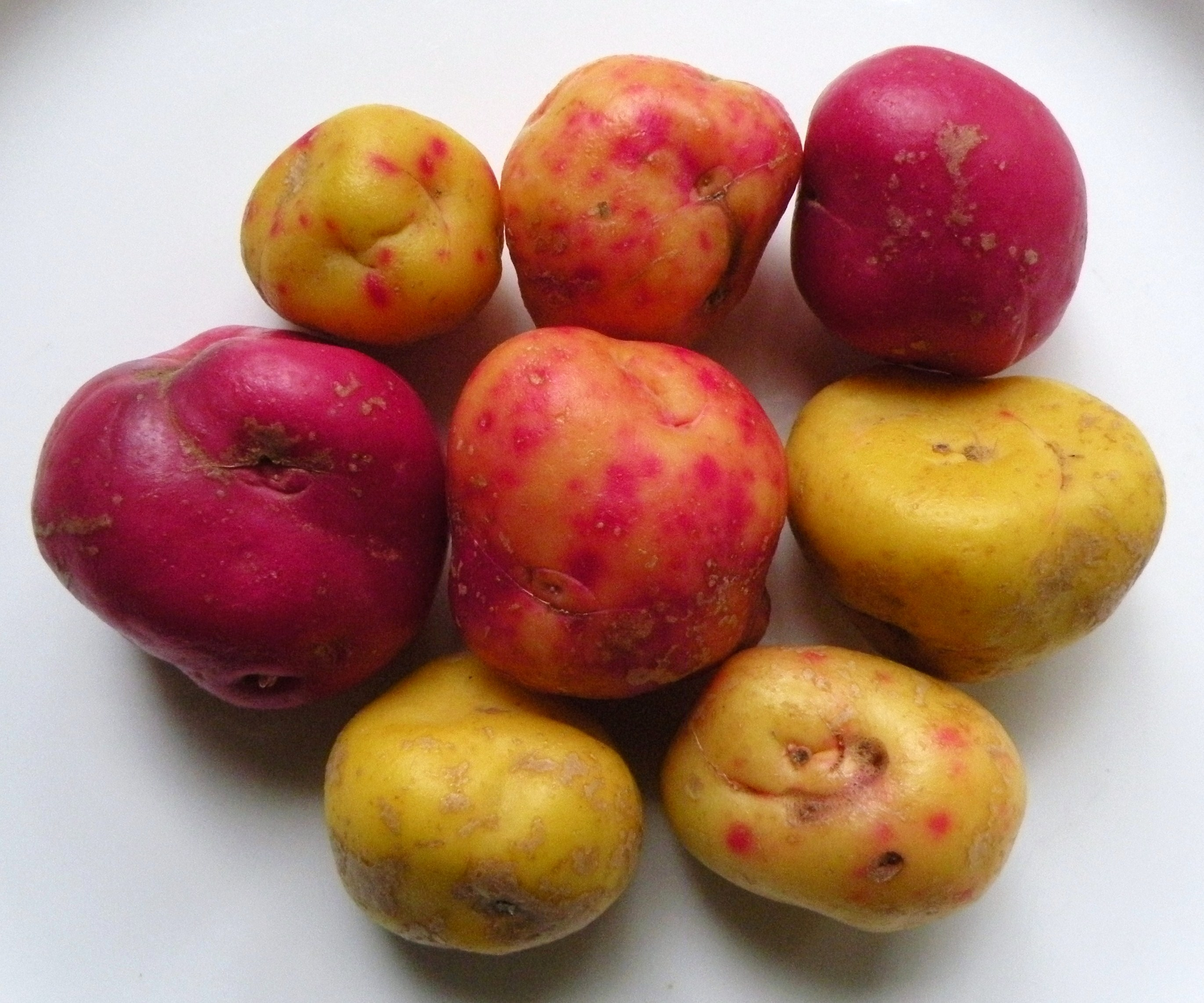
Ulluco tubers

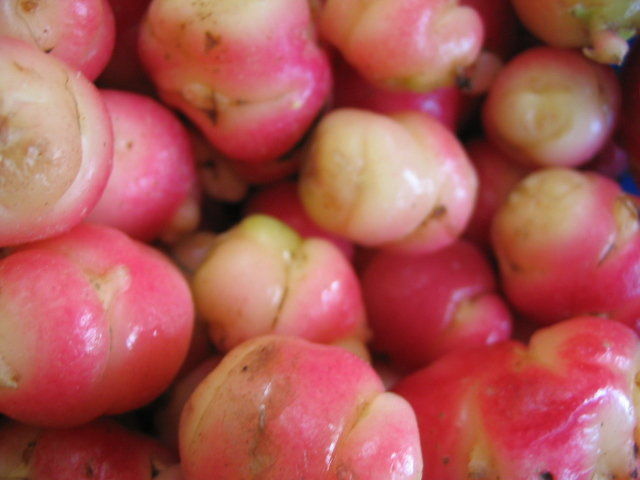
Oca tubers

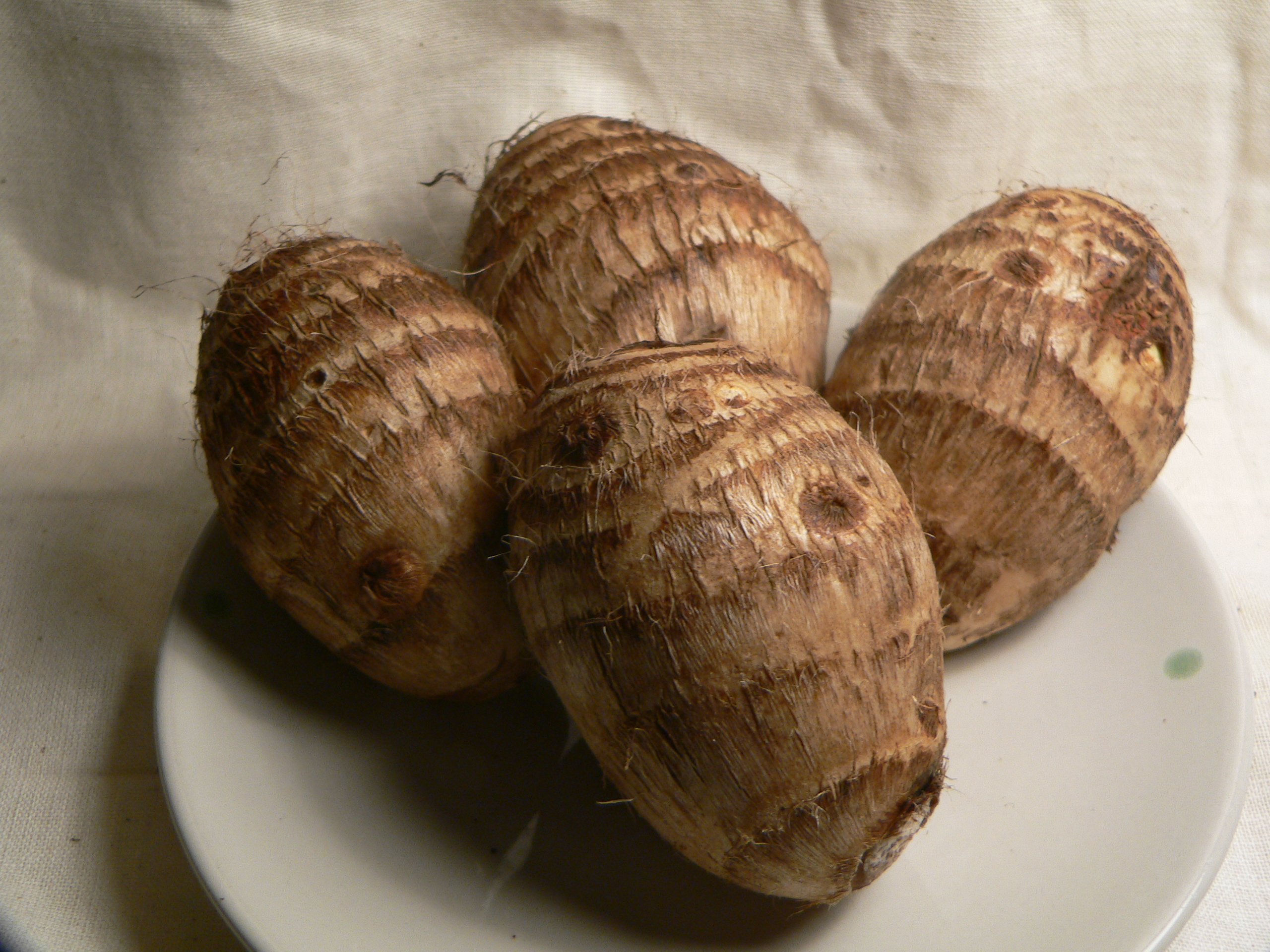
Taro roots

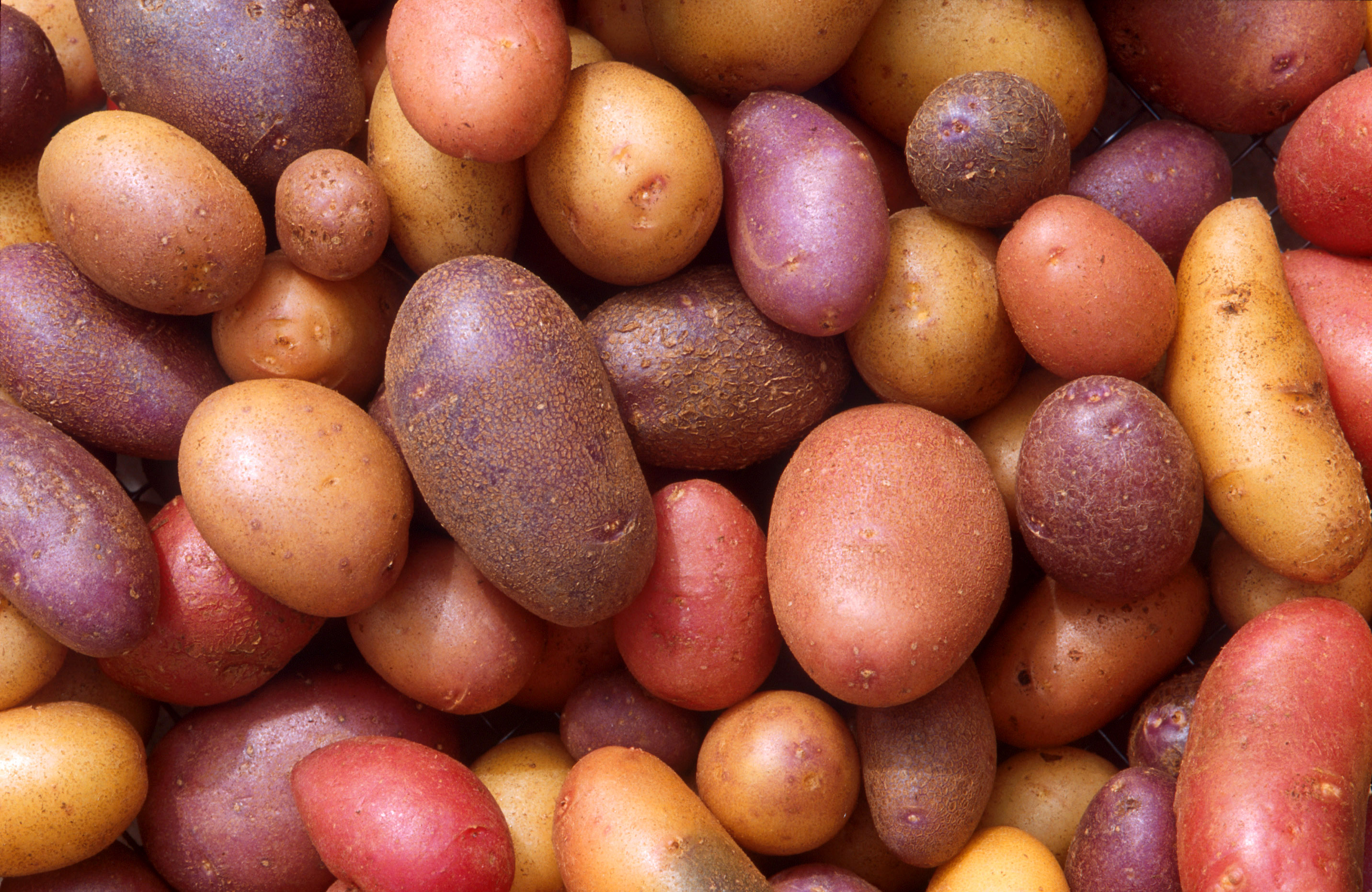
Potatoes

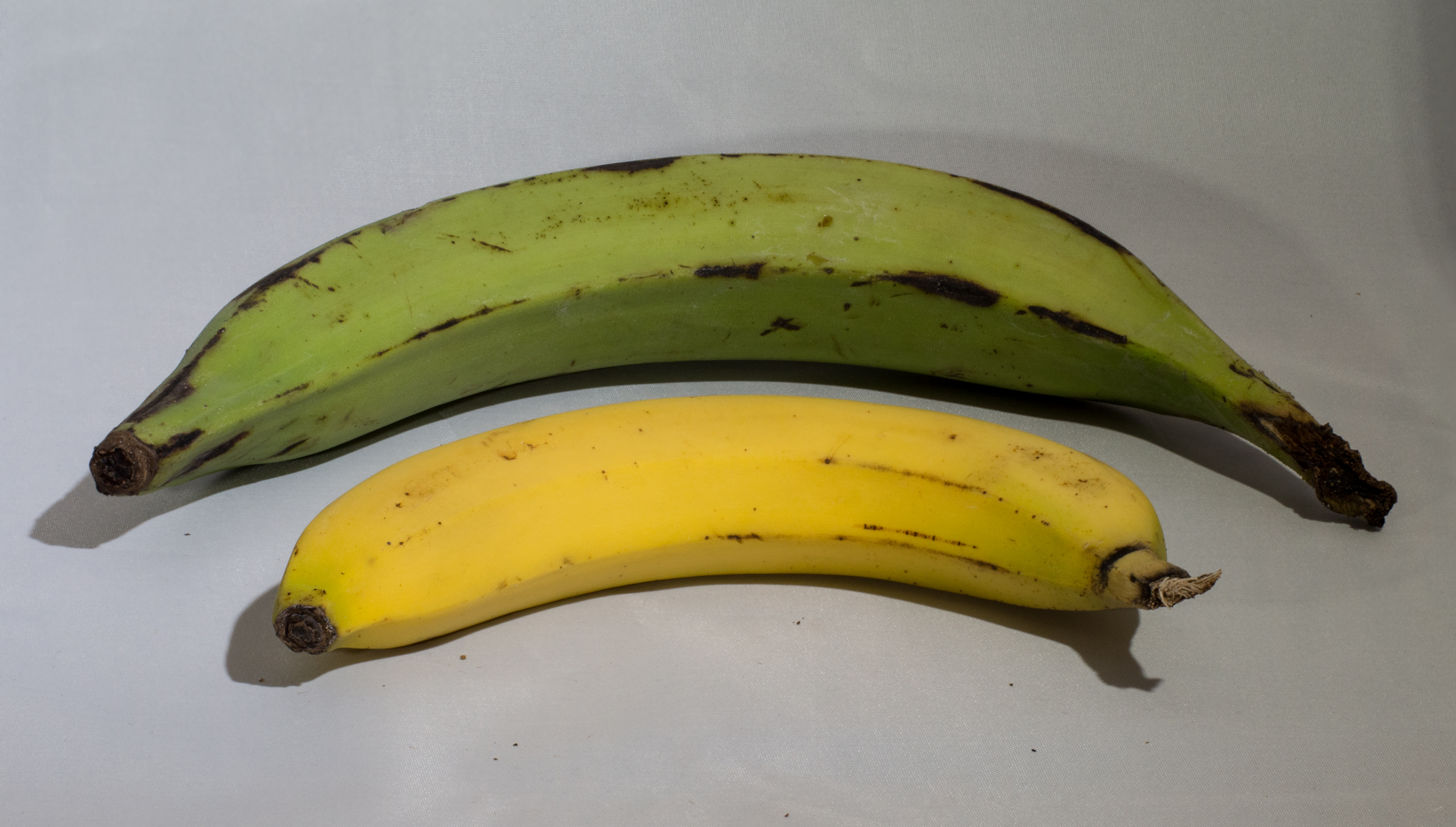
Plantain and banana

== See also ==
- Cash crop
- Subsistence agriculture
- Famine food
- Vavilov center – Area where domestication traits arise
