= Ginataang langka =

Filipino vegetable stew

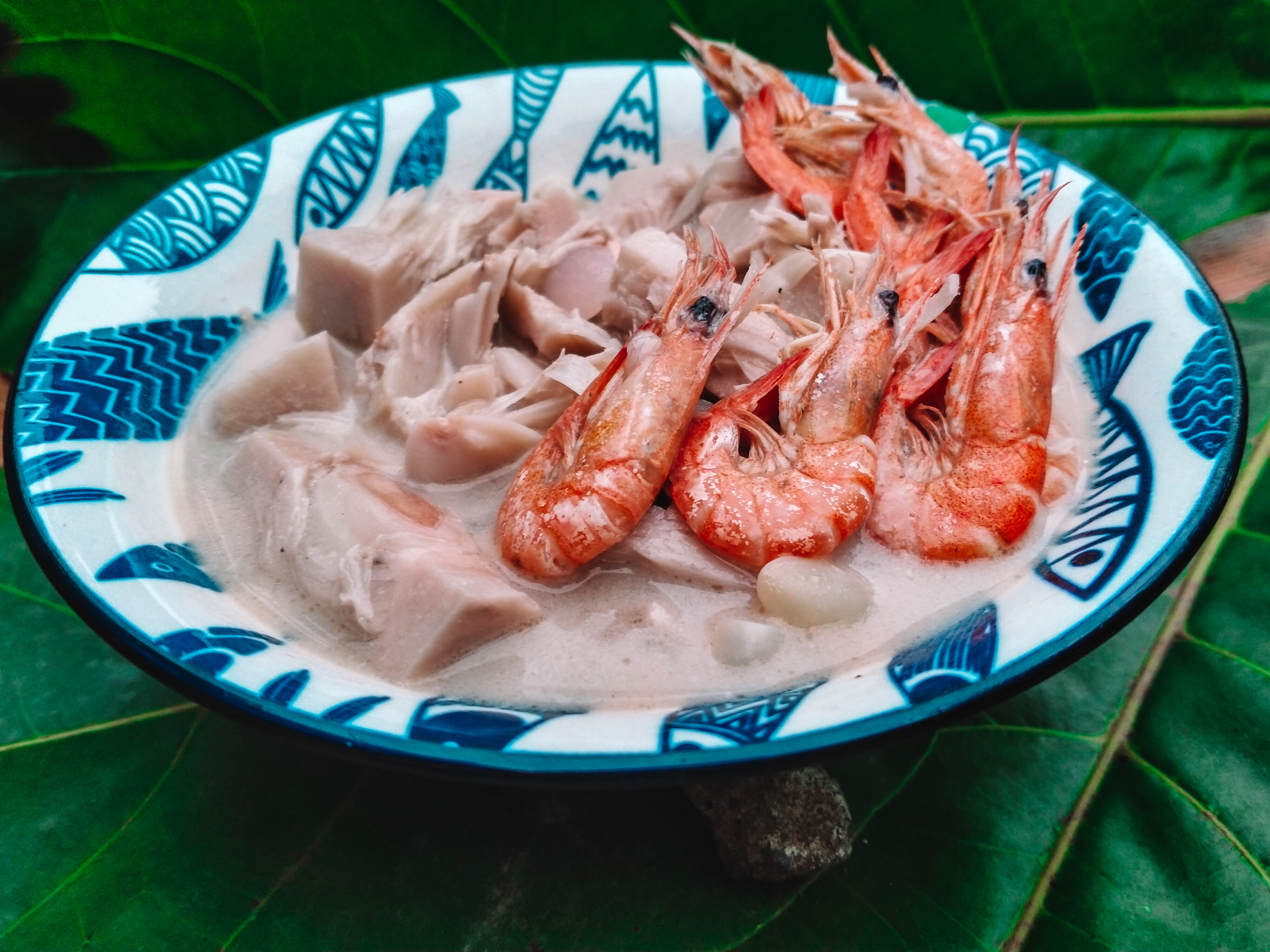
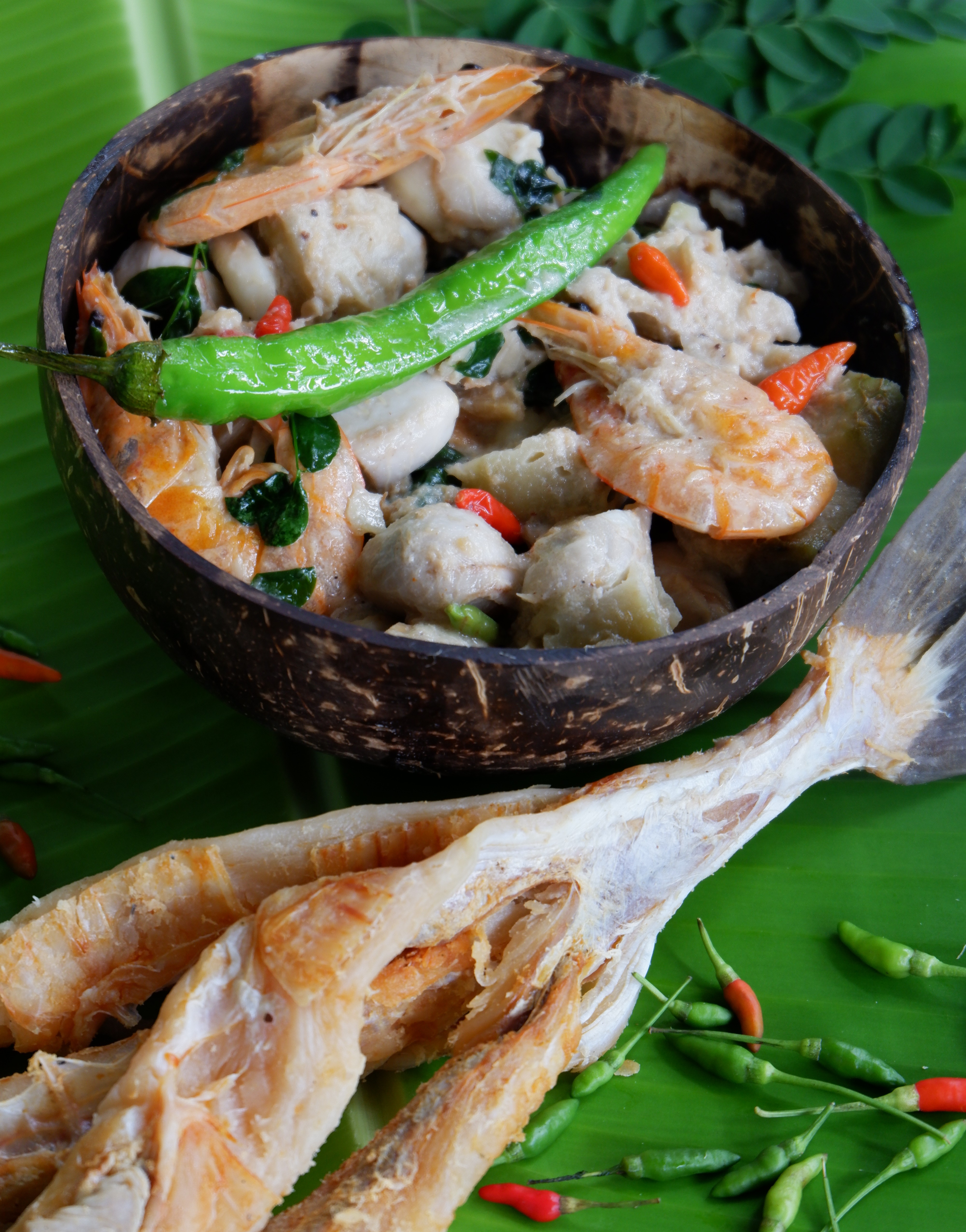
- Top: Ginataang langka with shrimp Bottom: Ginataang kamansi with shrimp and mahaba and labuyo chilis
- Alternative names: Ginataang nangka, Langka sa gata, Jackfruit in coconut milk
- Course: Main course
- Place of origin: Philippines
- Serving temperature: Hot
- Variations: Ginataang kamansi (breadnut); Ginataang rimas (breadfruit)

Ginataang langka, is a Filipino vegetable stew made from unripe jackfruit in coconut milk and spices. The dish includes a wide variety of secondary ingredients like seafood, meat, and other vegetables. The dish also commonly adds bagoong alamang (shrimp paste) and may be spiced with chilis or soured with vinegar. Notable variants of the dish are ginataang kamansi and ginataang rimas which use breadnut and breadfruit, respectively. Ginataang langka is a type of ginataan.

== Description ==
The basic recipe for ginataang langka includes unripe jackfruit (langka, seeded and sliced), coconut milk, garlic, onion, salt and pepper to taste, and usually bagoong alamang (shrimp paste) or patis (fish sauce). It can also use thickening agents like white jute (lumbay), jute mallow (saluyot), or okra, among others. The dish can also be spiced with siling haba or labuyo peppers, ginger, lemongrass or soured with vinegar.

The secondary ingredients for ginataang langka can vary widely and includes fish (including dried fish and smoked fish), shrimp, crab, other seafood, meat (including sausages), and combinations thereof. Moringa leaves (malunggay) can also be added.

A vegan or vegetarian version of the dish can also be created by simply omitting the meat and seafood and using mushrooms in place of shrimp paste or fish sauce.

== Variants ==
Jackfruit in ginataang langka can be replaced with breadnut (kamansi), breadfruit (rimas or reema), and more rarely, antipolo; resulting in ginataang kamansi, ginataang rimas, and ginataang antipolo, respectively. They are otherwise prepared identically.

== See also ==
- Sinantolan
- Ginataang labong
- Ginataang kalabasa
- Coconut soup
- List of dishes using coconut milk
