= Sandoricum dasyneuron =

Scientific classification
- Kingdom: Plantae
- Clade: Embryophytes
- Clade: Tracheophytes
- Clade: Angiosperms
- Clade: Eudicots
- Clade: Rosids
- Order: Sapindales
- Family: Meliaceae
- Genus: Sandoricum
- Species: S. dasyneuron

Binomial name
- Sandoricum dasyneuron Baill.

Species of tree

Sandoricum dasyneuron is a tree in the family Meliaceae. The specific epithet dasyneuron means 'shaggy nerve', referring to the leaf's underside venation.

== Description ==
Sandoricum dasyneuron grows up to 10 metres (33 ft) tall, occasionally to 25 metres (82 ft) tall, with a bole diameter of up to 25 cm (10 in). Its bark is smooth. The ovate leaves measure up to 24 cm (9 in) long. The inflorescences feature greenish white flowers.

== Distribution and habitat ==
Sandoricum dasyneuron is endemic to Borneo. Its habitat is in kerangas or dipterocarp forests, on ridges and hills, to elevations of 600 m (2,000 ft).
