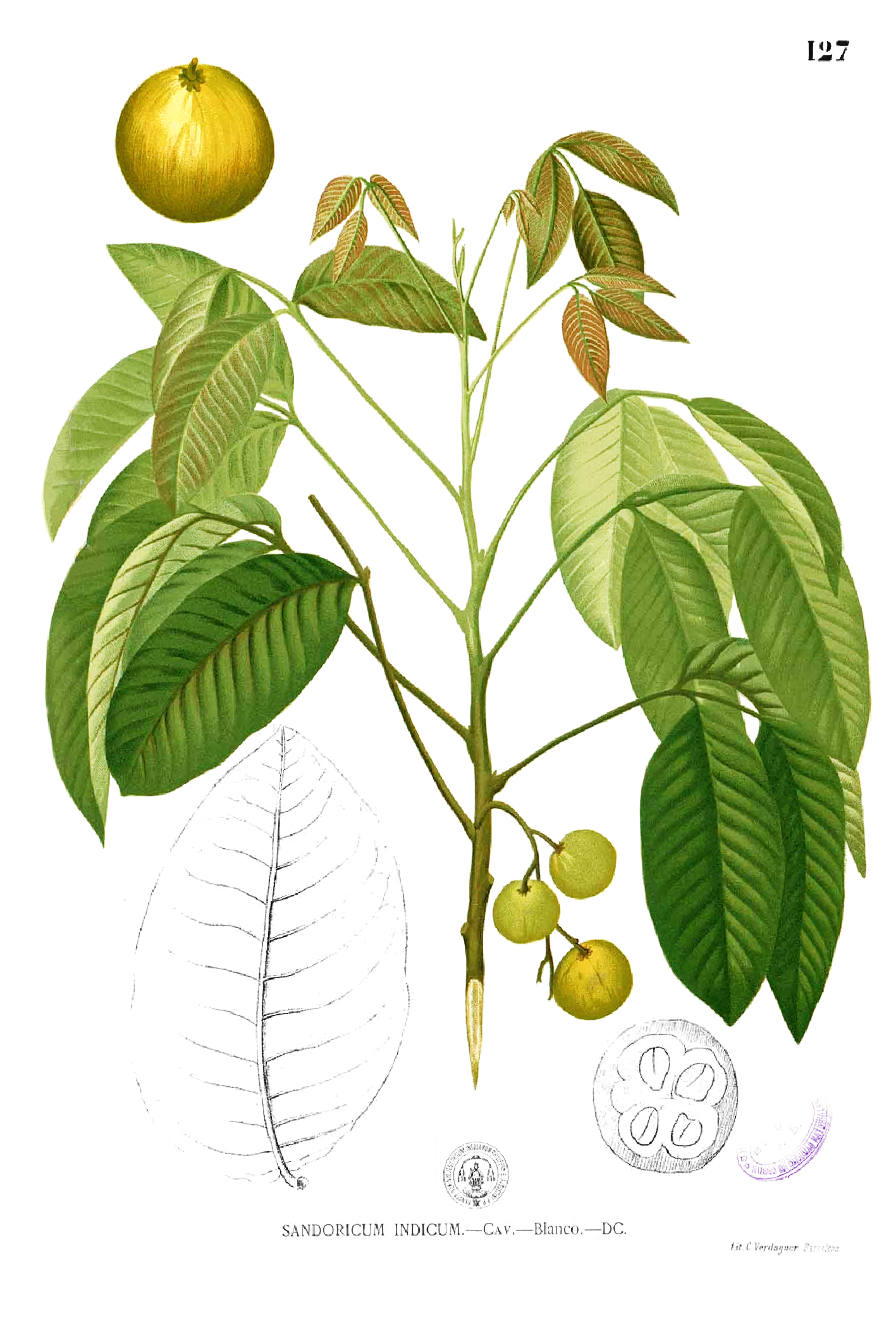
- Illustration of a santol, from Flora de Filipinas (1877–1883) by Francisco Manuel Blanco
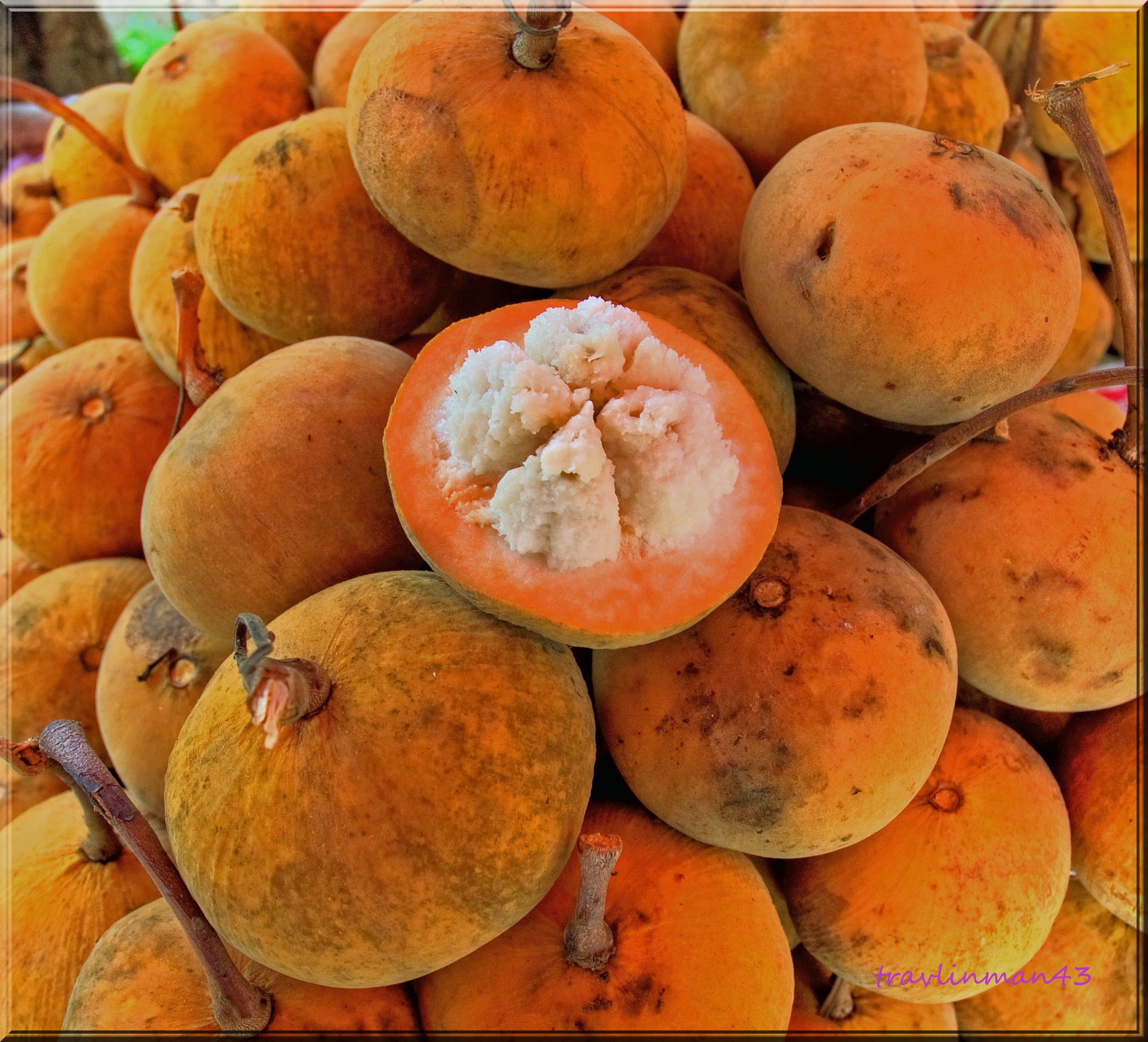
- Open santol with seeds and pulp from Thailand

Conservation status
- Least Concern (IUCN 3.1)

Scientific classification
- Kingdom: Plantae
- Clade: Embryophytes
- Clade: Tracheophytes
- Clade: Angiosperms
- Clade: Eudicots
- Clade: Rosids
- Order: Sapindales
- Family: Meliaceae
- Genus: Sandoricum
- Species: S. koetjape

Binomial name
- Sandoricum koetjape (Burm.f.) Merr.

Synonyms
- List: Melia koetjape Burm.f.; Sandoricum glaberrimum Hassk.; Sandoricum harmandii Pierre; Sandoricum harmsianum Perkins; Sandoricum indicum Cav.; Sandoricum ledermannii Harms; Sandoricum maingayi Hiern; Sandoricum nervosum Blume; Sandoricum radiatum King; Sandoricum serratum G.Don; Sandoricum ternatum Blanco; Sandoricum venosum M.Roem.; Sandoricum vidalii Merr.; Trichilia nervosa Vahl; Trichilia venosa Spreng.

= Sandoricum koetjape =

Species of tree

Sandoricum koetjape, the santol, sentul, setun or cotton fruit, is a tropical fruit native to maritime Southeast Asia.

== Origin and distribution ==
The santol is native to Malesia and New Guinea. It has been introduced to Indochina, Sri Lanka, India, northern Australia, Mauritius, and Seychelles. It is commonly cultivated throughout these regions and the fruits are seasonally abundant in the local and international markets.

== Botanical description ==
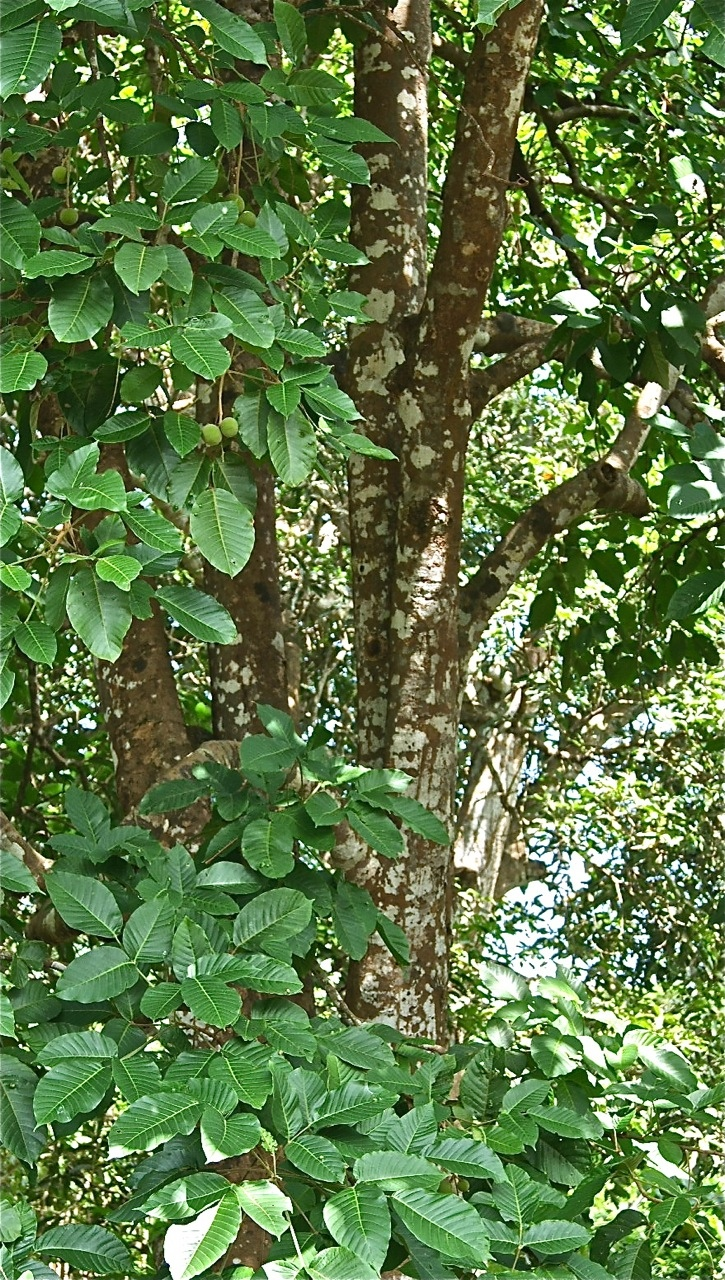
Foliage of a mature santol tree in the Philippines

There are two varieties of santol fruit, previously considered two different species, the yellow variety and the red. The difference is in the color that the older leaves turn before falling. The red appears to be more common and the reddish leaves mixed with the green ones add to the distinction and attractiveness of the tree. The fruits are often the size, shape and slightly fuzzy texture of peaches, with a reddish tinge. Both types have a skin that may be a thin peel to a thicker rind, according to the variety. It is often edible and in some cultivars may contain a milky juice. The central pulp near the seeds may be sweet or sour and contains inedible brown seeds. In some varieties the outer rind is thicker and is the main edible portion, with a mild peachy taste combined with some taste and the pulpy texture of apples. In others the outer rind is thinner and harder and the inner whitish pulp around the seeds is eaten. This may be rather sour in many cultivars, which has reduced the general acceptance of the tree. Most improved varieties have increased thickness of the edible outer rind, which can be eaten with a spoon leaving just the outer skin, and should increase the acceptance of the santol worldwide.

The fruit grows on a fast-growing tree that may reach 150 feet in height. It bears ribbed leaves and pink or yellow-green flowers about 1 centimeter long.

== Uses ==
=== Culinary ===
The ripe fruits are harvested by climbing the tree and plucking by hand, alternatively a long stick with a forked end may be used to twist the fruits off. The pulp is eaten raw and plain or with spices added. It is also cooked and candied or made into marmalade.

In Filipino cuisine, grated rind is cooked in coconut milk (with bits of pork and hot pepper) and served as sinantolan in Southern Luzon. The partly ripe sour fruits are also used as a souring agent in sour broth dishes like sinigang.

In Thai cuisine this fruit is used to make som tam when still not fully ripe. It is also one of the main ingredients in the santol and pork (แกงหมูกระท้อน) and santol and prawn Thai curries (แกงคั่วกระท้อนกุ้ง).

The wood of the tree is useful for construction, being plentiful and usually easy to work and polish. It makes a good shade tree. The leaves and bark have been used medicinally as a poultice. Several parts of the plant may have anti-inflammatory effects, and some chemical extracts from santol stems have shown anti-cancer properties in vitro. Extracts from santol seeds have insecticidal properties.

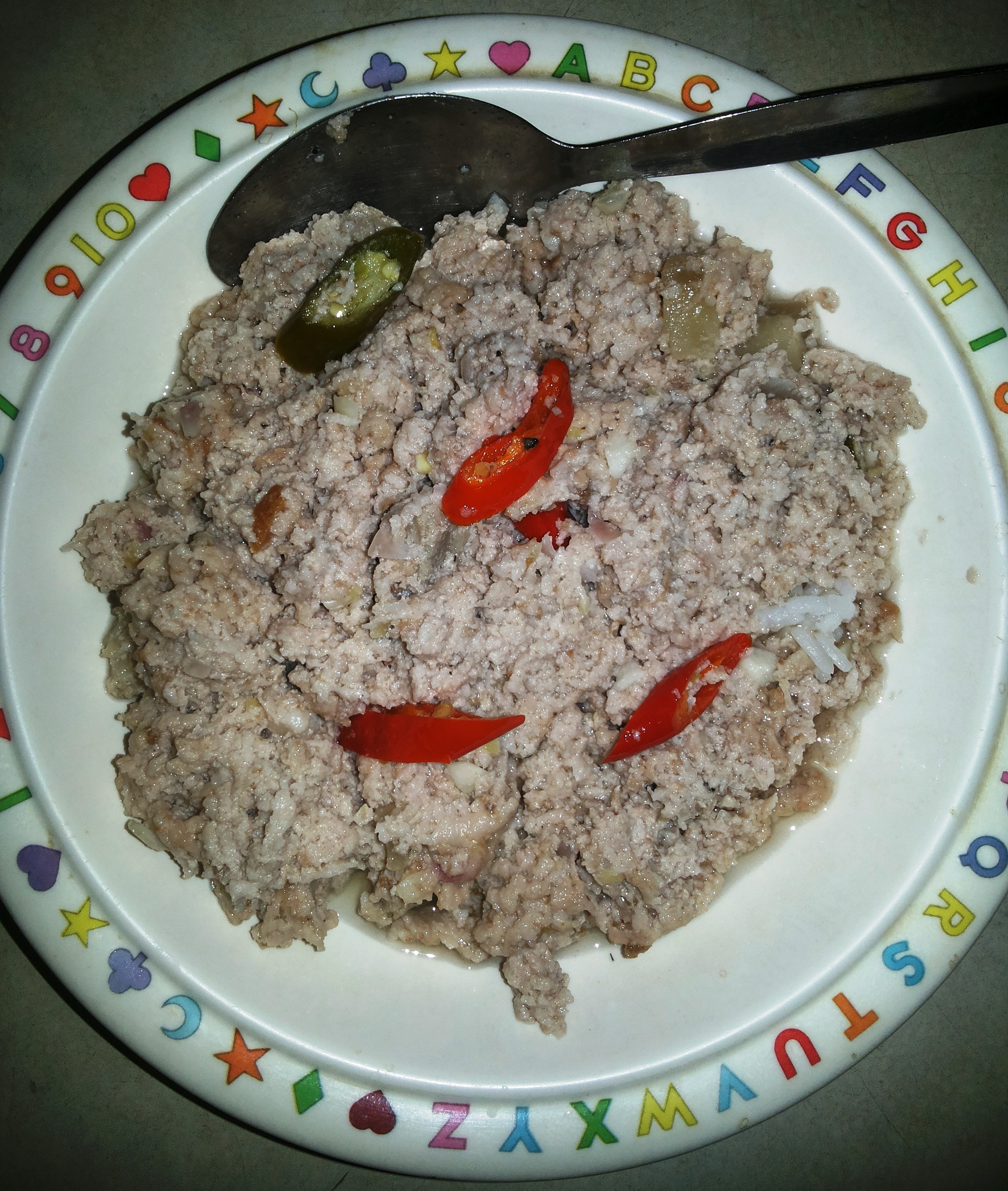
Sinantolan from the Philippines

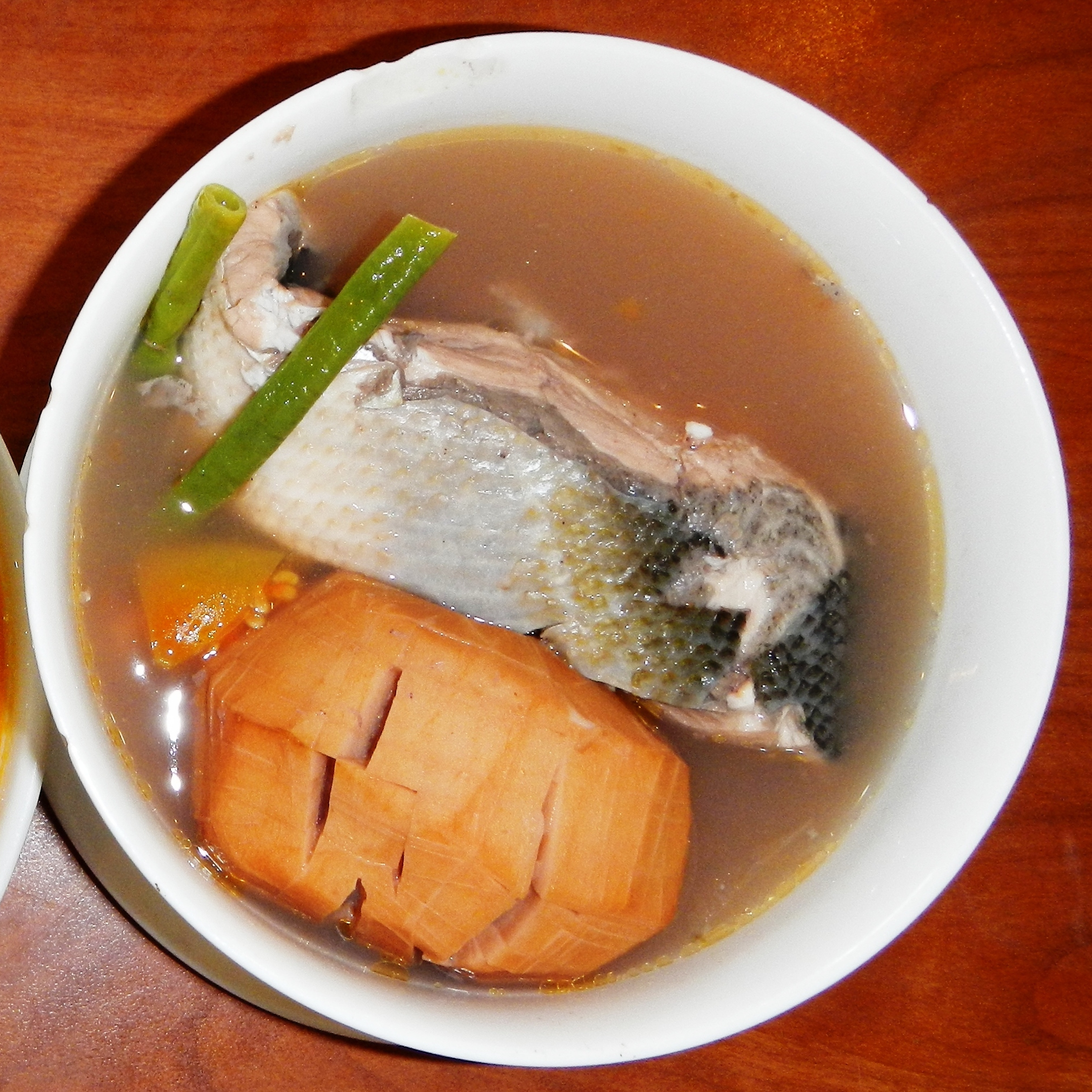
Filipino milkfish sinigang with santol

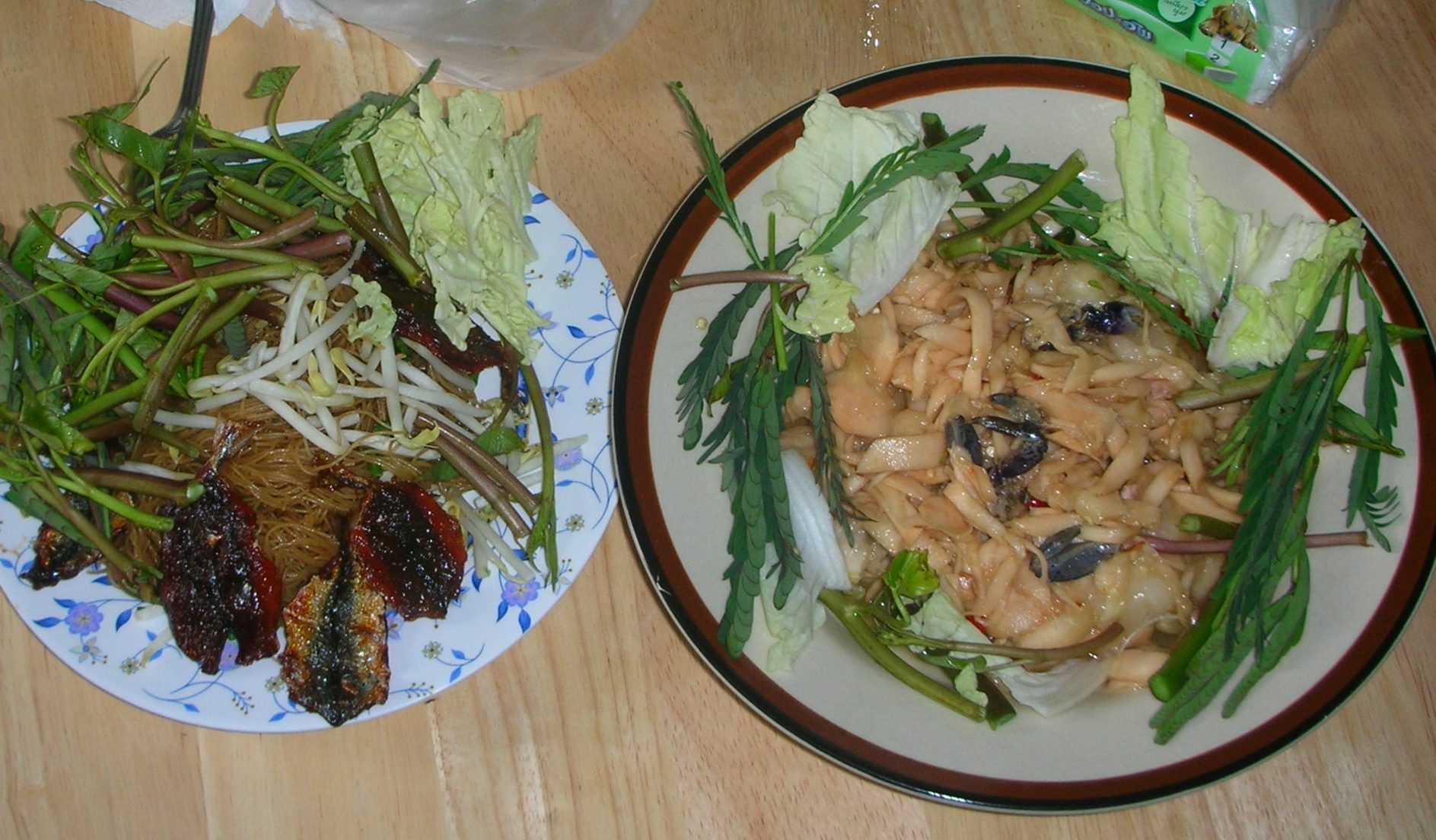
Thai santol som tam

== Intestinal obstruction and perforation ==
Doctors in Thailand and the Philippines have warned about the risk of intestinal obstruction and perforation from swallowing the whole seeds of Sandoricum koetjape. One source claims there are about 200 cases annually in the Philippines. The "bangkok santol", a larger variety, may be responsible for more severe cases of abdominal surgery. Common symptoms are abdominal pain with peritonitis that requires surgery to remove the seeds. In one retrospective review, 6 of 30 patients with Sandorica seed-induced colon perforation died within 28 days following the development of septic shock.

== Cultivation ==
Sandoricum koetjape is a tree of humid tropical regions that grows from sea level to an elevation of 3,000 feet (910 m). It grows better in deep and organic grounds, and with rainfall distributed throughout the year, although it also tolerates long, dry periods. The distance of planting from each other is 20 to 25 feet (6.1 to 7.6 m). It requires fertilization two times a year so it can grow better. Normally, seed trees produce fruit after 5 or 7 years of age, though some cultivars need only 3 or 4. The santol is a very productive tree. A mature tree can produce between 18,000 and 24,000 fruits per year. In Puerto Rico it produces in the months of August and September.

== Place names ==
Several places take the local names of santol, including Satun, Thailand; Sentul, Indonesia; and Sentul, Kuala Lumpur, Malaysia.

== See also ==
- Lansium domesticum (langsat/lanzones)
- Lychee
- Longan
