= Sandoricum beccarianum =

Scientific classification
- Kingdom: Plantae
- Clade: Tracheophytes
- Clade: Angiosperms
- Clade: Eudicots
- Clade: Rosids
- Order: Sapindales
- Family: Meliaceae
- Genus: Sandoricum
- Species: S. beccarianum

Binomial name
- Sandoricum beccarianum Baill.

Synonyms
- Sandoricum emarginatum Hiern

Species of tree

Sandoricum beccarianum is a tree in the family Meliaceae. It is named for the Italian botanist Odoardo Beccari.

== Description ==
Sandoricum beccarianum grows up to 35 metres (110 ft) tall with a trunk diameter of up to 70 centimetres (28 in). The flowers are yellow-green to white. The roundish fruits are coloured orange-red or pinkish-yellow and measure up to 3 cm (1 in) in diameter.

== Distribution and habitat ==
Sandoricum beccarianum grows naturally in Thailand, Sumatra, Peninsular Malaysia and Borneo. Its habitat is peatswamp forests near sea-level.
