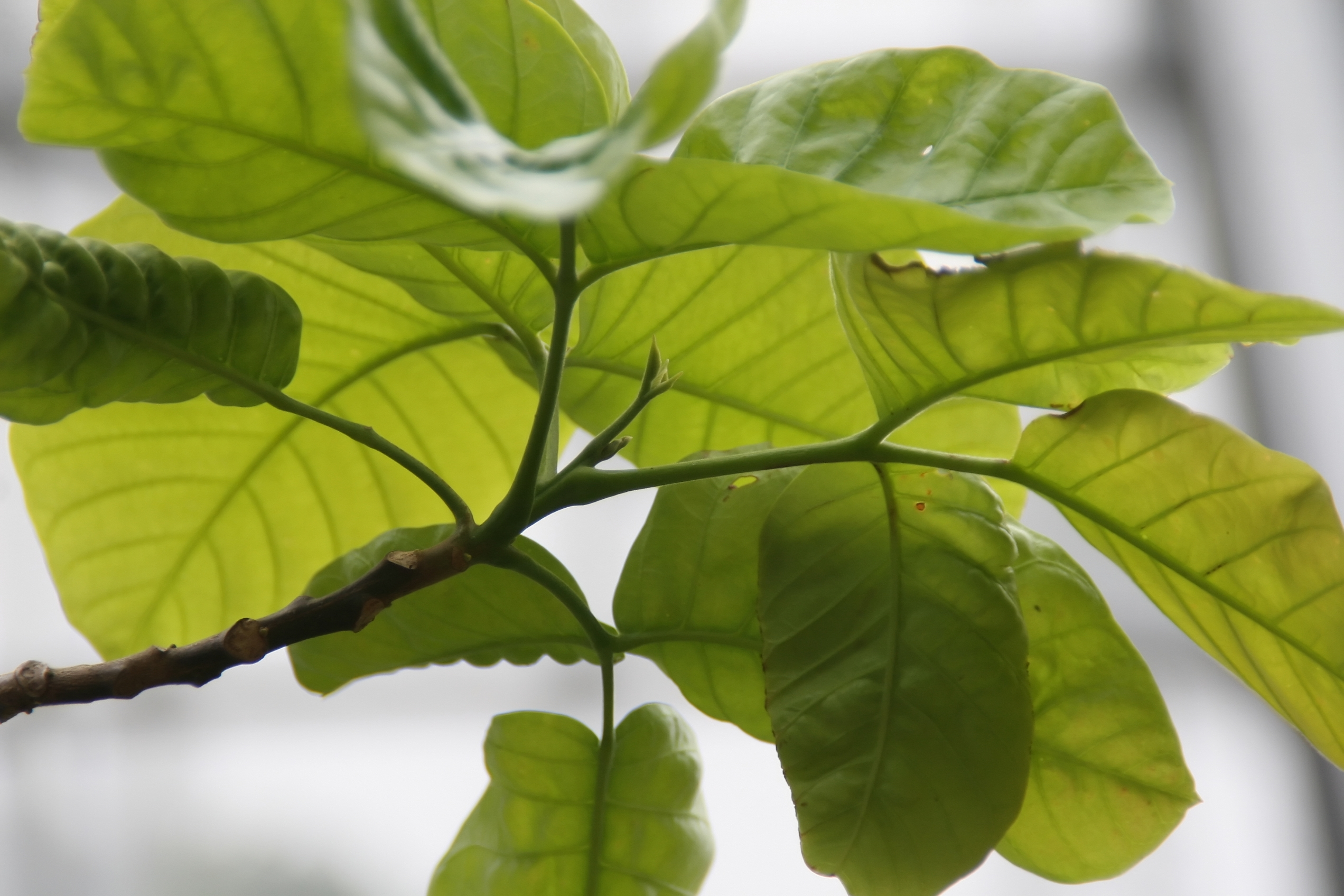
- Sandoricum koetjape leaves and fruit (below)
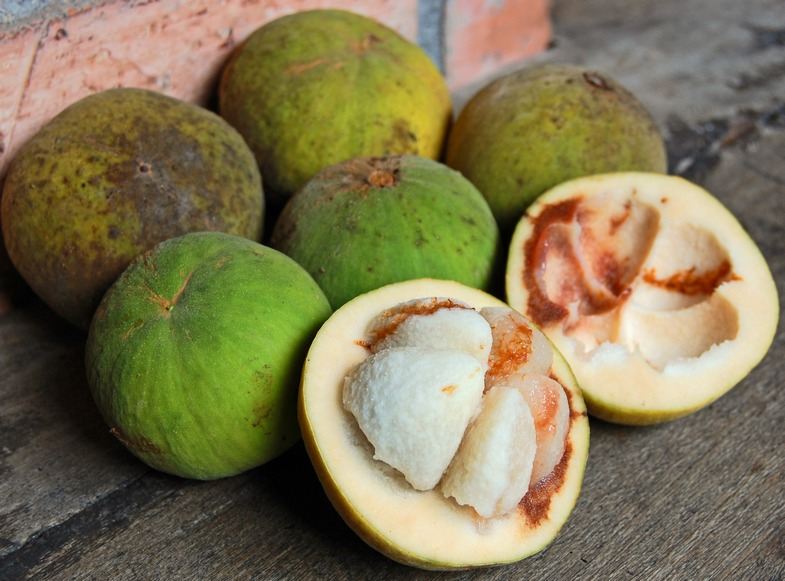

Scientific classification
- Kingdom: Plantae
- Clade: Tracheophytes
- Clade: Angiosperms
- Clade: Eudicots
- Clade: Rosids
- Order: Sapindales
- Family: Meliaceae
- Subfamily: Melioideae
- Genus: Sandoricum; Cav.

= Sandoricum =

Genus of trees

Sandoricum is an Asian genus of plants in the family Meliaceae. It contains the economically significant santol fruit tree.

== Species ==
As of April 2024, Plants of the World Online accepted the following species:

- Sandoricum beccarianum Baill.
- Sandoricum borneense Miq.
- Sandoricum caudatum Mabb.
- Sandoricum dasyneuron Baill.
- Sandoricum koetjape (Burm.f.) Merr. – santol tree
