= Sandoricum caudatum =

Scientific classification
- Kingdom: Plantae
- Clade: Tracheophytes
- Clade: Angiosperms
- Clade: Eudicots
- Clade: Rosids
- Order: Sapindales
- Family: Meliaceae
- Genus: Sandoricum
- Species: S. caudatum

Binomial name
- Sandoricum caudatum Mabb.

Species of flowering plants

Sandoricum caudatum is a tree in the family Meliaceae. The specific epithet caudatum refers to the caudate shape of the leaves.

== Description ==
Sandoricum caudatum grows up to 10 m (33 ft) tall, with a trunk diameter of up to 15 cm (6 in). Its grey or green bark is smooth. The caudate leaves measure up to 15 cm (6 in) long. The inflorescences feature cream to white flowers. The fruits are brown-yellow.

== Distribution and habitat ==
Sandoricum caudatum is endemic to Borneo (Sarawak). Its habitat is in kerangas or dipterocarp forests, at elevations to 350 m (1,100 ft).
