= Sinantolan =

Filipino dish

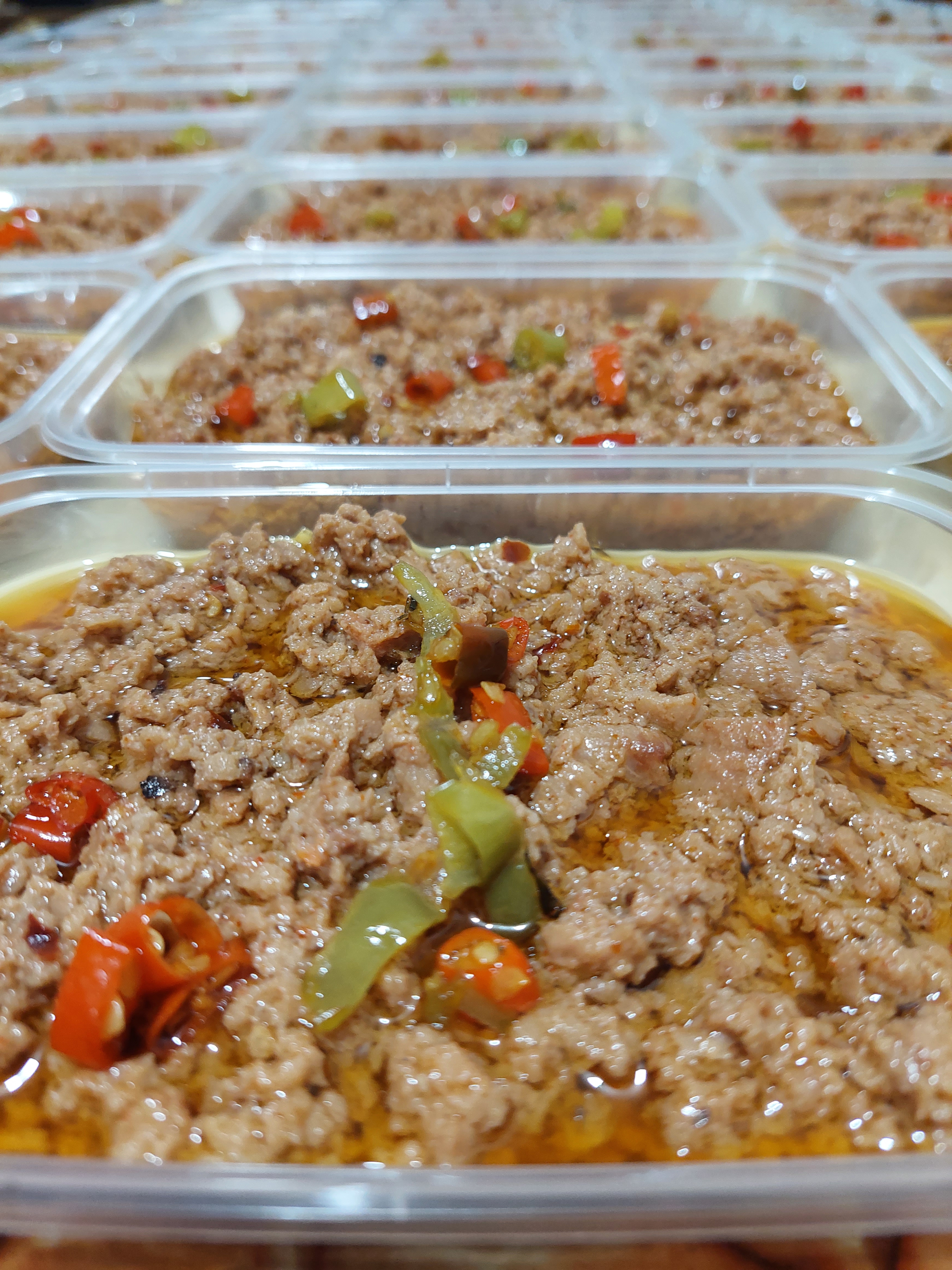
- Alternative names: ginataang santol, gulay na santol, gulayon na santol, giniling na santol, sinantulan, santolan, sinantol
- Course: Main course, side dish
- Place of origin: Philippines
- Region or state: Southern Luzon
- Serving temperature: Hot
- Main ingredients: santol rinds, coconut cream, siling haba, shrimp paste, onion, garlic, meat or seafood

Sinantolan, also known as ginataang santol or gulay na santol, is a Filipino dish made with grated santol fruit rinds, siling haba, shrimp paste (bagoong alamang), onion, garlic, and coconut cream. Meat or seafood are also commonly added, and a spicy version adds labuyo chilis. It originates from Southern Luzon, particularly from the Quezon, Laguna, and Bicol regions. It is a type of ginataan.

== Names ==
Sinantolan (also sinantulan or santolan) means "done with santol". It is also known as gulay na santol or gulayon na santol ("vegetable santol"), ginataang santol ("santol ginataan"), and giniling na santol ("ground santol").

== See also ==
- Ginataang labong
- Ginataang langka
- Laing
- Sinampalukan
- Sinigang
