= Sandoricum borneense =

Conservation status
- Least Concern (IUCN 3.1)

Scientific classification
- Kingdom: Plantae
- Clade: Embryophytes
- Clade: Tracheophytes
- Clade: Angiosperms
- Clade: Eudicots
- Clade: Rosids
- Order: Sapindales
- Family: Meliaceae
- Genus: Sandoricum
- Species: S. borneense

Binomial name
- Sandoricum borneense Miq.

Species of tree

Sandoricum borneense is a tree in the family Meliaceae. It is named for Borneo.

== Description ==
Sandoricum borneense grows up to 20 metres (70 ft) tall, with a trunk diameter of up to 40 cm (16 in), occasionally to 60 cm (24 in). It has a bole up to 15 m (50 ft) tall, without buttresses. Its smooth bark is brown. The leaves are lanceolate or ovate to elliptic and measure up to 22 cm (9 in) long. The inflorescences feature cream to green to pink flowers. The edible fruits are yellow or orange.

== Distribution and habitat ==
Sandoricum borneense is endemic to Borneo. Its habitat is on river banks to elevations of 330 m (1,100 ft).
