= Ginataang labong =

Filipino vegetable stew

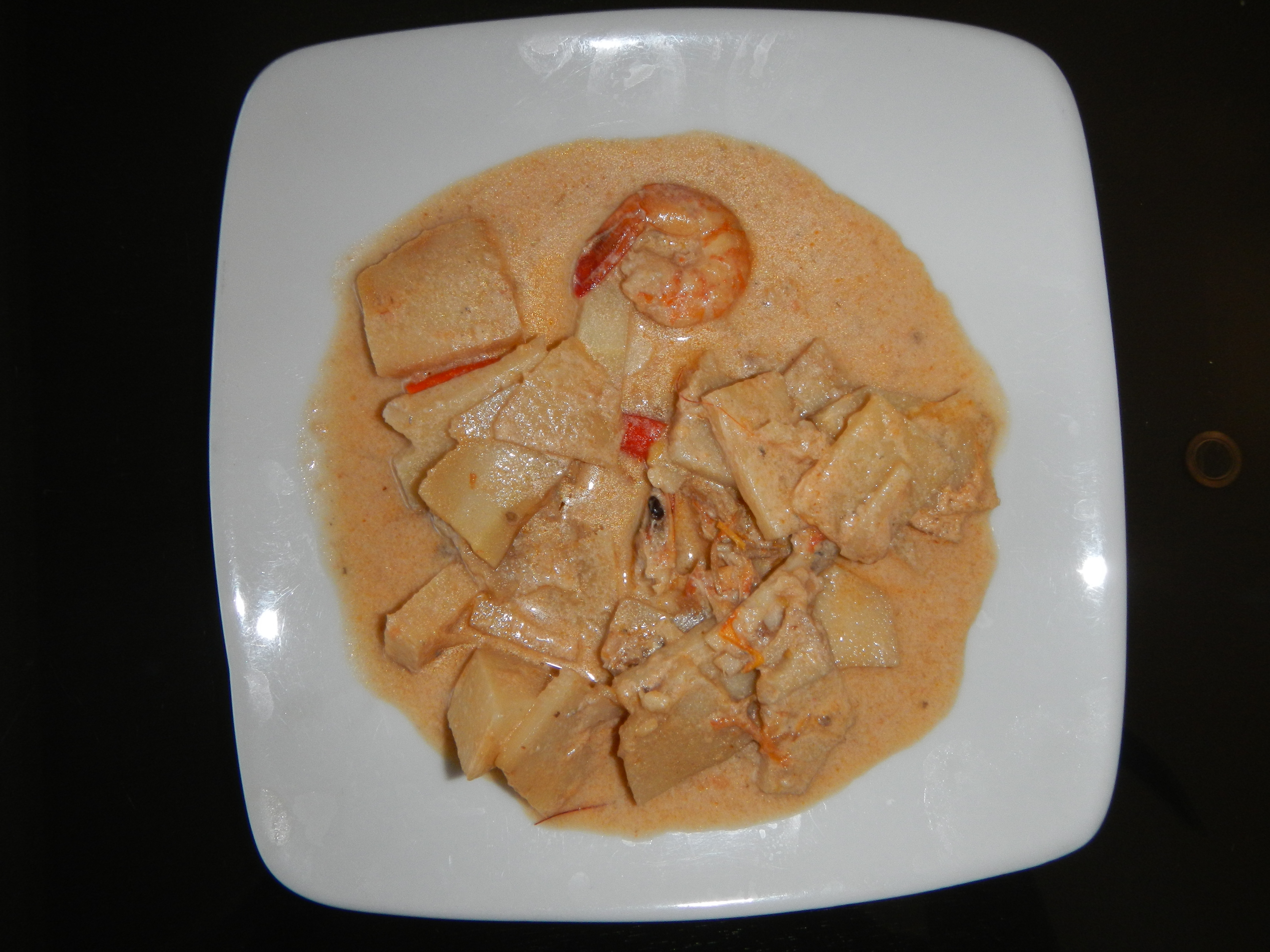
- Ginataang labong with shrimp
- Alternative names: Ginataang tambo
- Course: Main course
- Place of origin: Philippines
- Serving temperature: Hot
- Variations: Ginataang ubod (heart of palm in coconut milk)

Ginataang labong or ginataang tambo is a Filipino vegetable stew made from bamboo shoots in coconut milk and spices with seafood or meat. It is the most common way of preparing bamboo shoots in Philippine cuisine. Ginataang ubod is a variant of the dish made with heart of palm but is otherwise prepared identically. It is a type of ginataan.

== Description ==
Ginataang labong is prepared by first boiling the julienned or thinly sliced bamboo shoots until tender. For pre-boiled bamboo shoots, they are simply soaked for an hour before using to remove the sliminess. Garlic, onions, and ginger are then sauteed on a pan. Coconut milk is then added with the bamboo shoots, secondary ingredients (usually shrimp, fish, pork, or crab), along with the rest of the spices (like chilis, fish sauce, or lemongrass). Other vegetables can also be added, including jute mallow, chili pepper leaves, carrots, and tomatoes. It is served with white rice.

A vegetarian or vegan version of the dish can easily be created by replacing the seafood or meat with tofu.

== Variants ==
Ginataang ubod is a variant of the dish where heart of palm is used instead of bamboo shoots. It is otherwise prepared identically.

A sauteed variant of the recipe which excludes coconut milk is also known as ginisang labong (or ginisang ubod for heart of palm variants). If coconut milk is excluded and soy sauce and vinegar is added, it becomes adobong labong, a variant of Philippine adobo.

== See also ==
- Ginataang langka
- Ginataang kalabasa
- Sinantolan
- Coconut soup
- List of dishes using coconut milk
- List of stews
