= Breadnut =

Breadnut may refer to:

- Artocarpus camansi, a close relative of the breadfruit
- Brosimum alicastrum, also known as "Maya nut" or ramón, theorized to be a staple crop for the ancient Maya
