= List of dishes made using coconut milk =

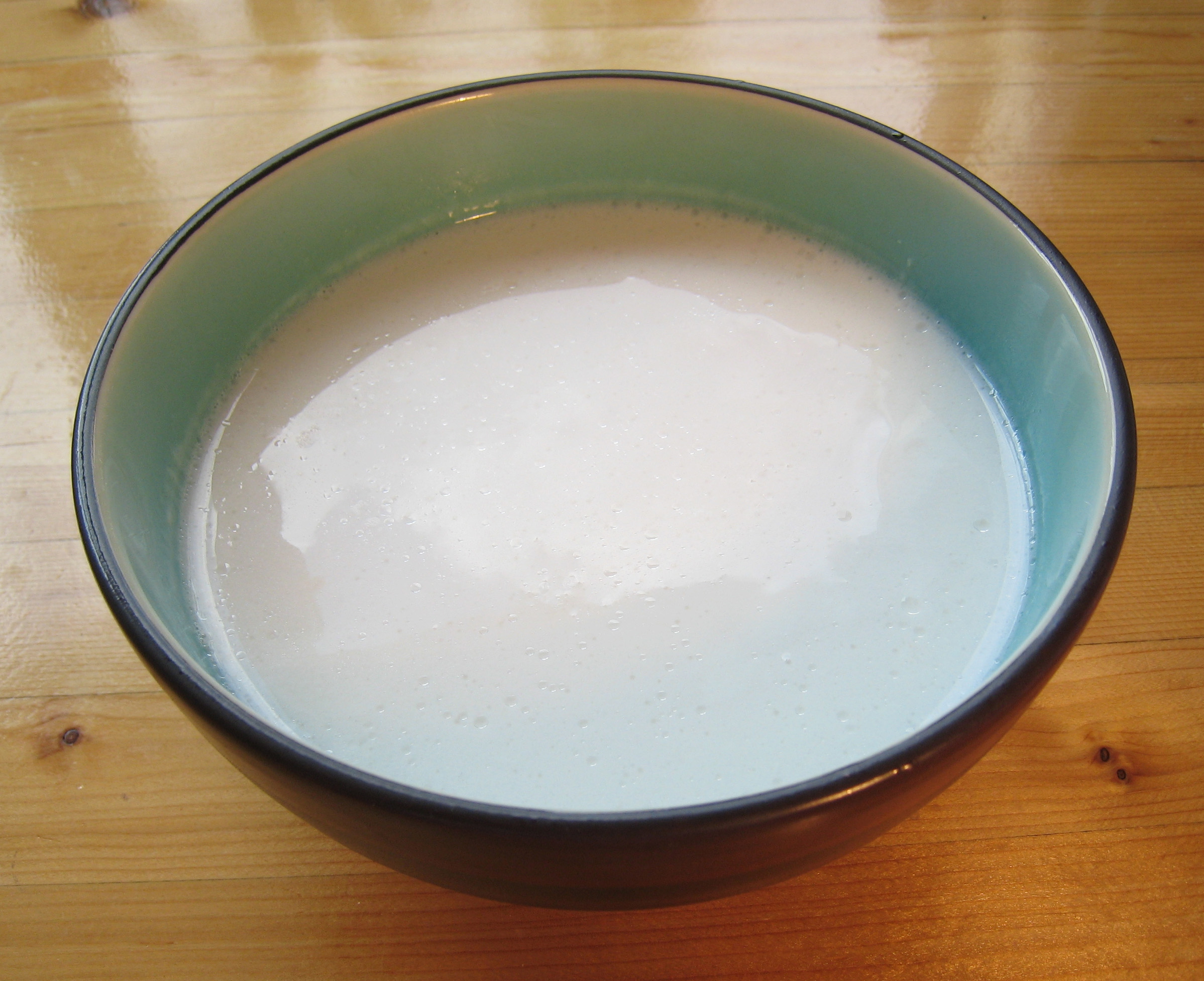
Coconut milk in a bowl

Coconut milk is a very popular food ingredient used in Southeast Asia (especially in Cambodia, Thailand, Malaysia, Indonesia, Singapore, and the Philippines) and in South Asia (specifically in Sri Lanka and South India). Coconut milk is the liquid that comes from the grated meat of a coconut. The color and rich taste of the milk can be attributed to the high oil content. Most of the fat is saturated fat.

== Dishes that use coconut milk ==
=== Brazilian ===
| Name | Image | Description |
|---|---|---|
| Canjica | | Traditional sweet made of white or yellow de-germed maize kernels, milk, coconut, peanuts, coconut milk, cinnamon and cloves. |
| Cuscuz branco | | |
| Manjar branco | | |
| Moqueca | | A Brazilian seafood stew based on fish, onions, garlic, tomatoes, and cilantro. It is cooked slowly, with no water added. |
| Pamonha | | A traditional Brazilian food, it is a paste made from fresh corn and milk, boiled wrapped in corn husks, turned into a dumpling. Pamonhas can be savoury or sweet, the latter being the norm in Northeastern Brazil and in the state of Rio de Janeiro. They can be filled with a variety of ingredients, or served plain. |
| Several desserts | | |
| Several seafood stews | | |
| Vatapá | | A Brazilian dish made from bread, shrimp, coconut milk, finely ground peanuts and palm oil mashed into a creamy paste. |

=== Burmese ===
| Name | Image | Description |
|---|---|---|
| Ngapyaw baung | | A dessert made from banana boiled in coconut milk and sugar. |
| Halawa | | A snack made of sticky rice, butter, coconut milk, similar to Indian halwa. Burmese halawa usually contains poppy seeds and is brown in color. |
| Kyauk-kyaw | | Coconut jelly |
| Mont let saung | | Tapioca balls, glutinous rice, grated coconut and toasted sesame with jaggery syrup in coconut milk |
| Ngyuenea hakushelat | | Coconut milk |
| Ohn no khao swè | | Curried chicken and wheat noodles in a coconut milk broth |
| Shwegyi mont | | Unsweet cake of semolina, coconut milk, and poppy seeds |
| Shwe yin aye | | A dessert prepared with agar jelly, tapioca and sago in coconut milk |

=== Caribbean ===
| Name | Image | Description |
|---|---|---|
| Callaloo | | A popular Caribbean dish originated from West Africa served in different variants across the Caribbean. Its main ingredient is a leaf vegetable, traditionally either amaranth (known by many local names, including callaloo or bhaaji), taro or Xanthosoma. |
| Coconut bread, bake and cakes | | |
| Coconut candy | | Prepared with coconut milk and coconut cream, the term "coconut candy" most commonly refers to the candy produced in Bến Tre province, Vietnam. |
| Coconut ice cream | | |
| Coconut soup | | |
| Oil down | | A stew of breadfruit, salted meat or chicken, coconut milk and spices. |
| Rice and peas | | A mainstay of Jamaican cuisine and is traditionally, but not exclusively, eaten with the Sunday meal. Coconut milk is used to flavor the dish. |
| Run down | | A stew dish in Jamaican cuisine and Tobago cuisine that typically consists of fish, reduced coconut milk, yam, tomato, onion and seasonings. Mackerel and salted mackerel are often used in the dish. |

=== Filipino ===
| Name | Image | Description |
|---|---|---|
| Adobo sa gata | | Version of Philippine adobo with coconut milk |
| Bibingka | | A class of baked rice cakes made with ground glutinous rice and coconut milk |
| Bicol express | | Spicy coconut-milk based stew with chilis, shrimp paste, and pork |
| Biko | | Steamed rice cake with coconut milk, brown sugar, and whole glutinous rice |
| Bilo-bilo | | Dessert soup of sticky rice dumpling in coconut broth, usually with saba banana, ube, and other ingredients. |
| Binagol | | Sweet steamed delicacy made from mashed giant taro corms, condensed milk, sugar, coconut milk, and egg yolks. |
| Binatog sa gata | | Filipino boiled corn dessert topped with freshly grated coconut, butter, and salt (or sugar). This variant adds coconut milk. |
| Binignit | | Dessert soup made from sweetened coconut milk, glutinous rice, fruits, and various root crops |
| Biniton | | Maguindanaon dish of chicken in coconut milk, cumin, curry, chilli and lemongrass |
| Buko pandan | | Agar and various jellies in pandan-flavored coconut milk |
| Cassava cake | | Moist cake made from grated cassava, coconut milk, and condensed milk with a custard layer on top |
| Dodol | | Confection made from coconut milk, jaggery, and rice flour |
| Espasol | | A cylinder-shaped Filipino rice cake prepared with rice flour, cooked in coconut milk and sweetened coconut strips, and then dusted with toasted rice flour. |
| Ginataan | | Generic term for entrées or desserts simmered in coconut milk |
| Ginataang alimango | | Mud crabs in coconut milk |
| Ginataang alimasag | | Blue crabs in coconut milk |
| Ginataang ampalaya | | Bitter melon in coconut milk |
| Ginataang curacha | | Spanner crabs in coconut milk. A notable version is curacha Alavar. |
| Ginataang hipon | | Shrimp in coconut milk |
| Ginataang isda | | Fish in coconut milk and spices |
| Ginataang kalabasa | | Coconut milk and calabaza soup, usually with shrimp and green beans |
| Ginataang kuhol | | Apple snails in coconut milk with leafy vegetables and spices |
| Ginataang langka | | Jackfruit in coconut milk. Variants include ginataang kamansi (breadnut) and ginataang rimas (breadfruit) |
| Ginataang mais | | Dessert gruel made from sweet corn and glutinous rice in coconut milk |
| Ginataang manok | | Chicken in coconut milk and spices |
| Ginataang munggo | | Dessert gruel made from glutinous rice and mung beans |
| Ginisang munggo sa gata | | A variant of ginisang munggo with coconut milk added, usually eaten with dried fish or pork. Sometimes also called "ginataang munggo" |
| Gising-gising (Ginataang sigarilyas) | | Minced winged beans or green beans in a spicy coconut milk broth |
| Gulaman at sago | | Sago pearls and agar with coconut milk |
| Halo-halo sa gata | | A popular Filipino dessert with shaved ice with sweet beans, ice cream, fruits, and other sundries. This variant uses coconut milk in place of evaporated milk |
| Inubaran | | Chicken cooked in coconut milk or cream with banana pith and lemongrass |
| Inulukan | | River crabs in taro leaves and coconut milk |
| Junay | | Rice steamed in coconut milk and wrapped in banana leaves with burnt coconut meat and various spices. |
| Kalamay | | A sticky sweet made of coconut milk, brown sugar, and ground glutinous rice, and sold in reused coconut shells |
| Kinilaw sa gata | | Raw fish in vinegar with coconut milk |
| Kulawo | | Salad using banana blossoms or grilled eggplants with coconut milk uniquely extracted from toasted grated coconut meat |
| Laing | | Spicy taro dish seasoned with shrimp, pork, and ginger |
| Linarang | | Fish stew with coconut milk, garlic, red onions, tomatoes, fermented black beans, chilis, and sour fruits |
| Maja blanca | | Coconut–based blancmange, often with sweet maize kernels. |
| Paelya | | Filipino adaptation with glutinous rice of Spanish paella and related dishes. Filipino versions can sometimes use coconut milk, especially in the bringhe variant. |
| Pancit buko | | A noodle dish which uses strips of young coconut milk instead of noodles. |
| Panyalam | | Fried rice cake made from glutinous rice and coconut milk |
| Piaparan | | Meat cooked in coconut milk with spices, shredded coconut, and palapa |
| Pininyahang hipon | | Shrimp cooked in a coconut milk and pineapple-based sauce |
| Pininyahang manok | | Chicken cooked in a coconut milk and pineapple-based sauce |
| Piyanggang manok | | Chicken cooked in a coconut milk with various sauces and pulverized burnt coconut meat |
| Salukara | | Fried pancake of rice flour and coconut milk |
| Sapin-sapin | | Layered dessert of glutinous rice and coconut milk |
| Sarsa na uyang | | Dish made from pounded freshwater shrimp, shredded coconut, chilis, ginger, peppercorns and other spices wrapped in coconut leaves and boiled in coconut milk |
| Sayongsong | | Steamed rice cake with rice, sweetened coconut milk, and calamansi, uniquely sold in cones made of banana leaves |
| Sinanglay | | Stuffed fish wrapped in leafy vegetables, lemongrass or pandan leaves, and cooked in spicy coconut milk |
| Sinantolan | | Grated santol in spicy coconut cream sauce with shrimp paste |
| Suman | | Rice cake made with glutinous rice and coconut milk wrapped in leaves |
| Tinumok | | Taro leaves with shrimp, fish, and coconut meat |
| Tiyula itum | | Meat in a black stew of coconut milk, burnt coconut meat, and various spices |
| Tupig | | Ground slightly fermented soaked glutinous rice (galapong) mixed with coconut milk, muscovado sugar, and young coconut (buko) strips. It is wrapped into a cylindrical form in banana leaves and grilled directly on charcoal. |
| Ube halaya | | Dessert made from mashed purple yam with sweetened coconut milk or dairy milk |

=== Hawaiian ===
| Name | Image | Description |
|---|---|---|
| Butter mochi | | A confection made from glutinous rice flour and butter |
| Haupia | | A gelatin-like pudding flavored with coconut milk |
| Kulolo | | A Hawaiian dessert made primarily from mashed taro corms and either grated coconut meat or coconut milk. |
| Squid lu'au | | Taro leaves and octopus simmered in coconut milk. |

=== Indian ===
==== Indian (Tamil Nadu & Kerala) ====
- Ada Prathaman
- Gothampu Payasam (Wheat Payasam)
- Kerala Curries
- Molugootal (sometimes used in conjunction with fresh grated coconut to enhance flavour)
- Mutton Stew
- Paal-Appam (sweetened coconut milk in the center of the Aapam for taste)
- Parippu Prathaman
- Puttu (Steam cake) Grated coconut is mixed with rice powder for taste

==== Indian (Goan and Konkani cuisine in Karnataka, and Maharashtra) ====
Almost all dishes have coconut milk and paste as its base (called as "Aapros" in Konkani)

- Solkadhi
- All vegetable and fish curries
- Coconut Rice
- Payasa, Mangane, Kheer

==== Indian (Northeast) ====
- Sunga Saul – a dish of the Cuisine of Assam, a state in Northeast India

==== Indian (North India) ====
Coconut and coconut milk are both used as a garnish in several traditional dishes across Bihar, Eastern U.P., Uttaranchal and Bundelkhand. Its generally used in dishes made of jackfruit, pumpkin and other gourds.

=== Indonesian ===
| Name | Image | Description |
|---|---|---|
| Arem-arem | | A type of food in Javanese cuisine prepared with rice and mincemeat. Includes lontong, and many more. |
| Ayam percik | | Malay grilled chicken. |
| Bika ambon | | Cake |
| Bubur ketan hitam | | Dessert |
| Cassava | | Leaf curry |
| Dodol | | A candy. Pictured is an assortment of dodol on display in Bandung, Indonesia. |
| Es bubur pisang ijo | | A dessert from Makassar. Banana wrapped in pandanus rice flour dough, served with coconut custard, red coconut syrup, and crushed ice. |
| Es bumi hangus | | Dessert |
| Es cendol | | Dessert |
| Es dawet ayu | | Dessert |
| Es doger | | Dessert |
| Es kacang hijau | | A dessert that is also known as "bubur kacang hijau" |
| Es putar | | Ice cream |
| Es shanghai | | Dessert |
| Es teler | | Dessert |
| Gudeg | | Javanese jack fruit stew |
| Gulai Kepala Ikan | | |
| Jack fruit | | Curry using young jack fruit |
| Klappertaart | | Dutch-influenced Indonesian cake originating from Manado, North Sulawesi. Tart made from flour, sugar, milk, butter, as well as coconut flesh and juice. |
| Kolak | | Dessert |
| Kue mangkok | | |
| Laksa | | A spicy noodle soup. |
| Lemang | | |
| Nasi lemak | | A Malay fragrant rice dish cooked in coconut milik and pandan leaf. |
| Nasi liwet | | A food from Solo, Central Java. Rice is usually cooked in water, but nasi liwet is rice cooked in coconut milk and chicken broth, thus give the rice rich and succulent taste. This is a traditional Javanese way of cooking, from the past until now. |
| Sayur lodeh | | A vegetable soup prepared from vegetables in coconut milk popular in Indonesia, but most often associated with Javanese cuisine. |
| Sop kaki kambing | | Lamb soup |
| Soto betawi/soto Jakarta | | Beef soup |
| Tongseng kambing | | Lamb curry |
| Nasi uduk | | An Indonesian-style steamed rice cooked in coconut milk. The dish is originally from Jakarta. |
| Opor ayam | | A dish consisting of chicken cooked in coconut milk from Indonesia, especially from Central Java. |
| Rendang | | |

=== Malaysian and Singaporean ===
| Name | Image | Description |
|---|---|---|
| Ayam percik | | Grilled chicken in spicy coconut marinade/sauce |
| Bubur cha cha | | |
| Bubur hitam | | |
| Chendol | | Basic ingredients are coconut milk, jelly noodles made from rice flour with green food coloring (usually derived from the pandan leaf), shaved ice and palm sugar. |
| Chicken | | Curry |
| Gula melaka | | A Malaysian sugar made from the sap of flower buds from the coconut tree |
| Laksa | | A spicy noodle soup that typically includes coconut milk in its preparation. |
| Lemak ayam chili padi | | Chicken/fish in bird's eye chili coconut milk |
| Lemak lodeh | | Curry vegetables |
| Nasi lemak | | A fragrant rice dish cooked in coconut milk and "pandan" leaf commonly found in Malaysia, where it is considered the national dish; Brunei; Singapore; |
| Pengat pisang | | |
| Puteri salat | | |
| Rendang | | Beef/chicken. Rendang is on the left side of the plate in the image. |

=== Maldivian ===
| Name | Image | Description |
|---|---|---|
| Mas riha | | A type of curry in Maldivian cuisine prepared with fresh tuna and eaten with rice or with roshi flatbread. |

=== Sri Lankan ===
| Name | Image | Description |
|---|---|---|
| Pitthu | | Coconut Cake |
| Coconut milk | | Pol kiri - a dish in itself, usually used for gravy with Pittu |
| Coconut toffee | | Pol Toffee |
| Green bean curry | | |
| Milk gravy (Kiri hodi) | | Coconut milk with a dash of saffron and onion, usually used for gravy with String-hoppers |
| Kiribath | | Coconut milk rice |
| Pol Pani | | Sri Lankan pancake made with coconut milk |
| Parippu | | Sri Lankan style lentil or Dhal curry |
| Ala Kari | | Potato Curry |
| Malumas Kari | | Fish Curry |
| Harakamas Kari | | Beef Curry |
| Kukulmas Kari | | Chicken Curry |
| Watalappam | | A coconut custard pudding made of coconut milk or condensed milk, jaggery, cashew nuts, eggs, and various spices, including cardamom, cloves, and nutmeg. This dessert is very popular in Sri Lanka |

=== Thai ===
| Name | Image | Description |
|---|---|---|
| Coconut rice | | Prepared by soaking white rice in coconut milk or cooking it with coconut flakes. |
| Green curry | | A variety of curry in Thai cuisine. The name "green" curry derives from the color of the dish. Green curries tend to be as hot as red curries or hotter. The green color comes from fresh green chillies. The "sweet" in the Thai name (wan means "sweet") refers to the particular color green itself and not to the taste of the curry. |
| Ice Cream | | |
| Khanom tako | | Jasmine scented coconut pudding set in cups of fragrant pandanus leaf. |
| Massaman curry | | A Thai curry dish that is Muslim in origin. Due to its Muslim roots and therefore Islamic dietary laws, this curry is most commonly made with beef, but can also be made with duck, tofu, chicken, or, for non-Muslims, with pork (as pork is a forbidden food for Muslims, this variety is not eaten by observant Thai Muslims). The dish is flavored with Massaman curry paste, which usually contains coconut milk, roasted peanuts or cashews, potatoes, bay leaves, cardamom pods, cinnamon, star anise, palm sugar, fish sauce, chili and tamarind sauce. |
| Thai satay sauce | | |
| Phanaeng curry | | Generally milder than other Thai curries, it traditionally includes dried chili peppers, galangal, lemongrass, coriander root, coriander seeds, cumin seeds, garlic, shrimp paste and salt, and sometimes also shallots and peanuts. |
| Pineapple curry | | |
| Red curry | | A popular Thai dish consisting of curry paste to which coconut milk is added. The main ingredients are garlic, shallots, (dried) red chili peppers, galangal, shrimp paste, salt, kaffir lime peel, coriander root, coriander seeds, cumin seeds, peppercorns and lemongrass. The base is properly made with a mortar and pestle Pictured is Thai red curry with pork. |
| Thai Shaved Ice or Nam Kang Sai | | Known as snow cone in the US. Another name is 'Wan-Yen'. In Thailand, this kind of cold dessert is very popular as well. The differences from other countries' shaved ice is that in the Thai version the toppings (mixings) are in the bottom and the shaved ice is on top. There are between 20 and 30 varieties of mixings that can be mixed in. Among them are young coconut that have been soaked in coconut milk, black sticky rice, chestnuts, sweetened taro, red beans, cheng-sim-ee (special flour that is very chewy and slippery) and many more. |
| Tom Kha "coconut soup" | | Prepared with coconut milk, galangal, lemon grass, kaffir lime leaves, and chicken, and often contains straw, shiitake, or other mushrooms, as well as coriander leaves. |
| Yellow curry | | One of three major kinds of Thai curry that are commonly found in Thai restaurants in the West. There is also kaeng lueang (Thai: แกงเหลือง), which directly translated means "yellow curry" in Thai but this curry does not contain any coconut milk. |

=== Vietnamese ===
| Name | Image | Description |
|---|---|---|
| Cháo cá lóc nước cốt dừa | | Rice congee with fish in coconut broth |
| Chè đậu xanh nước cốt dừa | | Mung bean sweet pudding dessert in coconut milk |
| Chuối rim mật nước cốt dừa | | Banana simmered in honey and coconut milk |
| Curry chicken | | A common delicacy in South Asia, Southeast Asia, as well as in the Caribbean (where it is usually referred to as "curry chicken"). A typical South Asian curry consists of chicken stewed in an onion and tomato-based sauce, flavored with ginger, garlic, chili peppers and a variety of spices, often including turmeric, cumin, coriander, cinnamon, cardamom, and others. Pictured is Vietnamese chicken coconut curry. |
| Ốc len xào dừa | | Escargot sautéed in coconut milk |
| Thịt kho nước cốt dừa | | Caramelized braised pork in coconut milk |

=== Unsorted ===
- Bajigur
- Bebinca
- Boluo fan
- Bubur kacang hijau
- Chè bà ba
- Coquito
- Kalu dodol
- Khanom thuai
- Khao tom mad
- Kiribath
- Kokis
- Mango pomelo sago
- Nasi gurih
- Opor
- Sombi
- Stew peas

== See also ==
- List of coconut dishes
