= Hipon =

Hipon is the Filipino word for shrimp or prawn. It may also refer to:

== Shrimp dishes ==
- Burong hipon
- Ginataang hipon
- Halabos na hipon
- Ginataang kalabasa at hipon
- Nilasing na hipon
- Pininyahang hipon
- Rebosadong hipon
- Sinigang na hipon

== Others ==
- Herlene Budol a.k.a. Hipon Girl (born 1999), Filipina actress and comedian
