= Ginataang kuhol =

Filipino snail dish

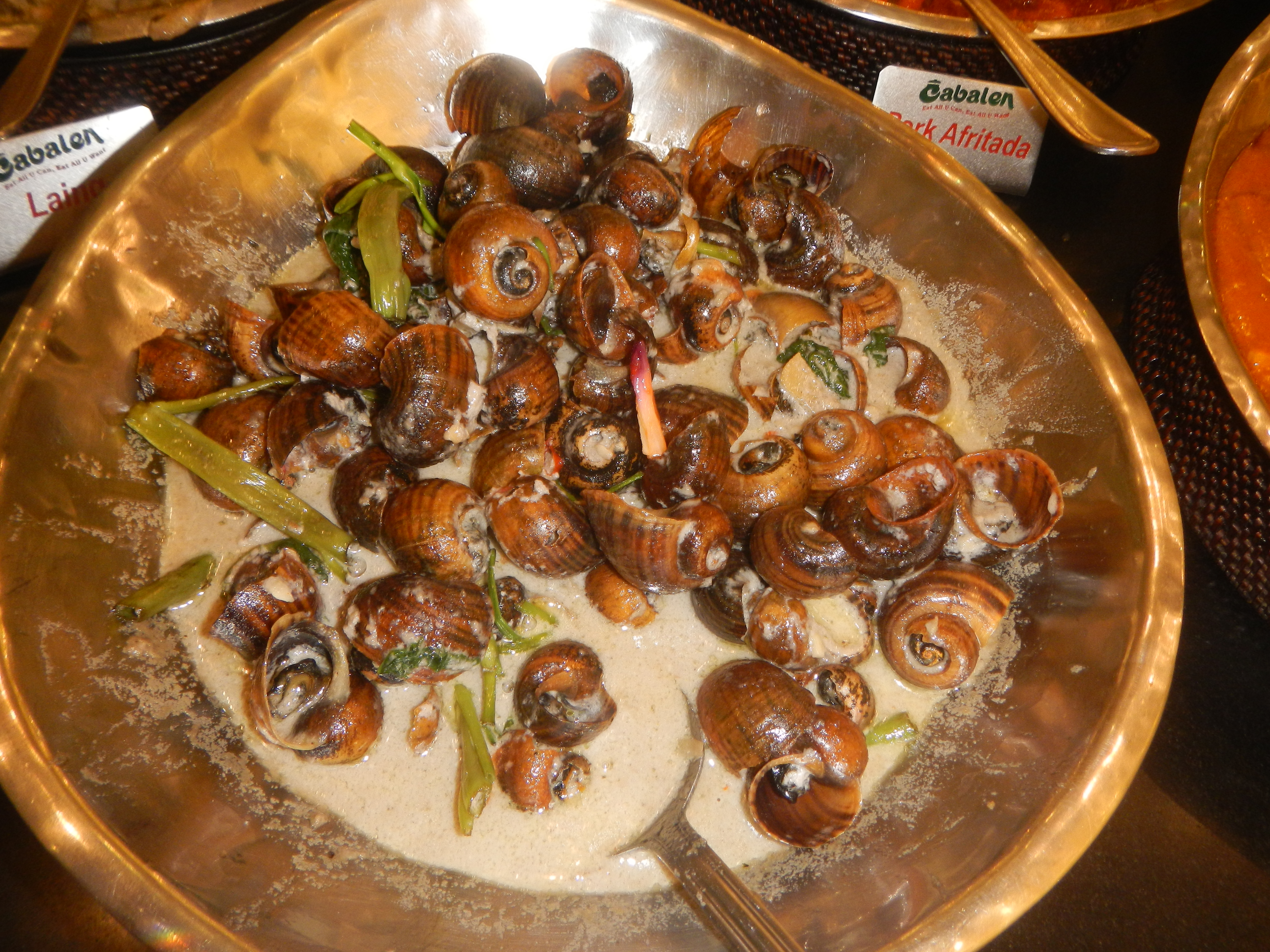
- Course: Main course
- Place of origin: Philippines
- Serving temperature: Hot
- Main ingredients: Apple snails, coconut milk

Ginataang kuhol is a Filipino snail stew made from apple snails in coconut milk with leafy vegetables, onion, garlic, ginger (or turmeric), siling haba chilis, bagoong alamang (shrimp paste), and salt and pepper. Labuyo chilis are also commonly added for a spicier version. The leafy vegetables can include water spinach, moringa leaves, and chili pepper leaves, among others.

== Background ==
The dish originally used members of the genus Pila, which are the native apple snail species found in the Philippine islands. These are known as kuhol (also kohol or cohol) in most parts of the Philippines, and bisokol (or bisocol) in northeastern Luzon. However, it is now more common to use the highly invasive golden apple snails (Pomacea canaliculata), also called kuhol, which are originally from South America and considered to be in the top 100 of the "World's Worst Invasive Alien Species". Golden apple snails originally entered the Philippines from 1982 to 1984 from farmed specimens in Taiwan. They were originally meant to be used as food for humans and domestic ducks, but they escaped into the wild. They have become a major pest in rice fields in the Philippines as well as in other Asian countries.

== Description ==
Before cooking, the apple snails need to be cleaned thoroughly to remove the dirt and slime. This is done by soaking them overnight or for a few hours, which induces them to regurgitate digested matter. Cornstarch or flour may be added to the water to aid this process. They are rinsed thoroughly and the shells cleaned. The source of the snails are also important. They have to be from clean bodies of water, which can sometimes be difficult to ascertain. Commercially farmed canned versions can also be bought as an alternative.

The apple snails can be cooked in the shell or without them. If the shells are retained, the end tips are snipped off to facilitate cooking and to loosen the meat inside.

The dish is cooked by sautéing the garlic, onions, and ginger (or turmeric) until translucent and fragrant. The snails are added and sautéed for a minute before thin coconut milk and the rest of the spices are added. It is simmered in low heat for around ten minutes. The leafy vegetables are added last and (optionally) thicker coconut cream. It is served when the broth is reduced to a thick sauce. Lime, butter, and shallots or leeks may be added to the cooked snails.

== See also ==
- Ginataang hipon
- Coconut soup
- List of dishes using coconut milk
