= Coconut shrimp =

Shrimp dish

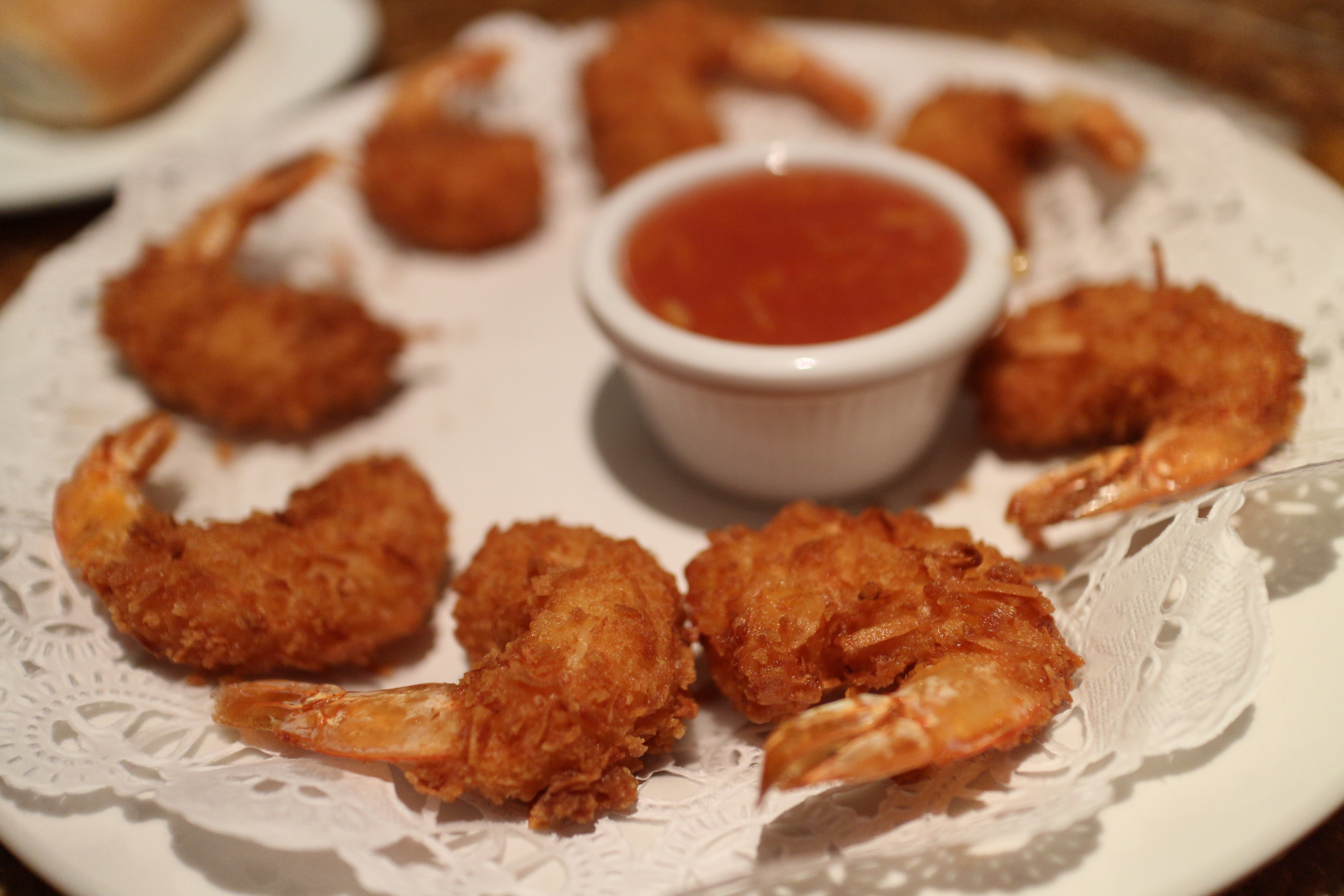
Coconut shrimp with a dipping sauce

Coconut shrimp is a shrimp dish prepared using shrimp and coconut as primary ingredients. Two dishes named "coconut shrimp" exist; one is prepared as a crunchy dish with the shrimp coated and deep-fried, pan-fried or baked; the other as a sautéed dish, using coconut milk and other ingredients. Either can be prepared and served on skewers.

== Crunchy ==
Crunchy coconut shrimp is typically prepared using shrimp that are coated with flour, placed in an egg wash, coated with a flaked coconut and bread crumb mix, and then deep-fried. The shrimp can be butterflied prior to being coated. Panko bread crumbs or standard bread crumbs can be used, as can a mixture of both. Chopped nuts such as macadamia or almond are occasionally also used as an additional ingredient in the bread crumb mixture.

This version of the dish can also be baked, pan-fried, or grilled, rather than deep-fried. Baked versions may have fewer calories and fat compared to deep-fried versions. After cooking, the shrimp have a crunchy texture. It may be served with various, typically sweet, fruit-based dipping sauces, such as sweet and sour sauce, peach sauce, apricot sauce, sweet chili sauce, or marmalade, among others, with or without a creamy component (such as mayonnaise) mixed in with it.

Coconut shrimp is sometimes served with lime wedges.

Crunchy coconut shrimp can be served as an appetizer or as a main course. It is a common menu item at seafood restaurants and is a popular dish at tiki bars in the Caribbean and the Florida Keys.

Crunchy coconut shrimp

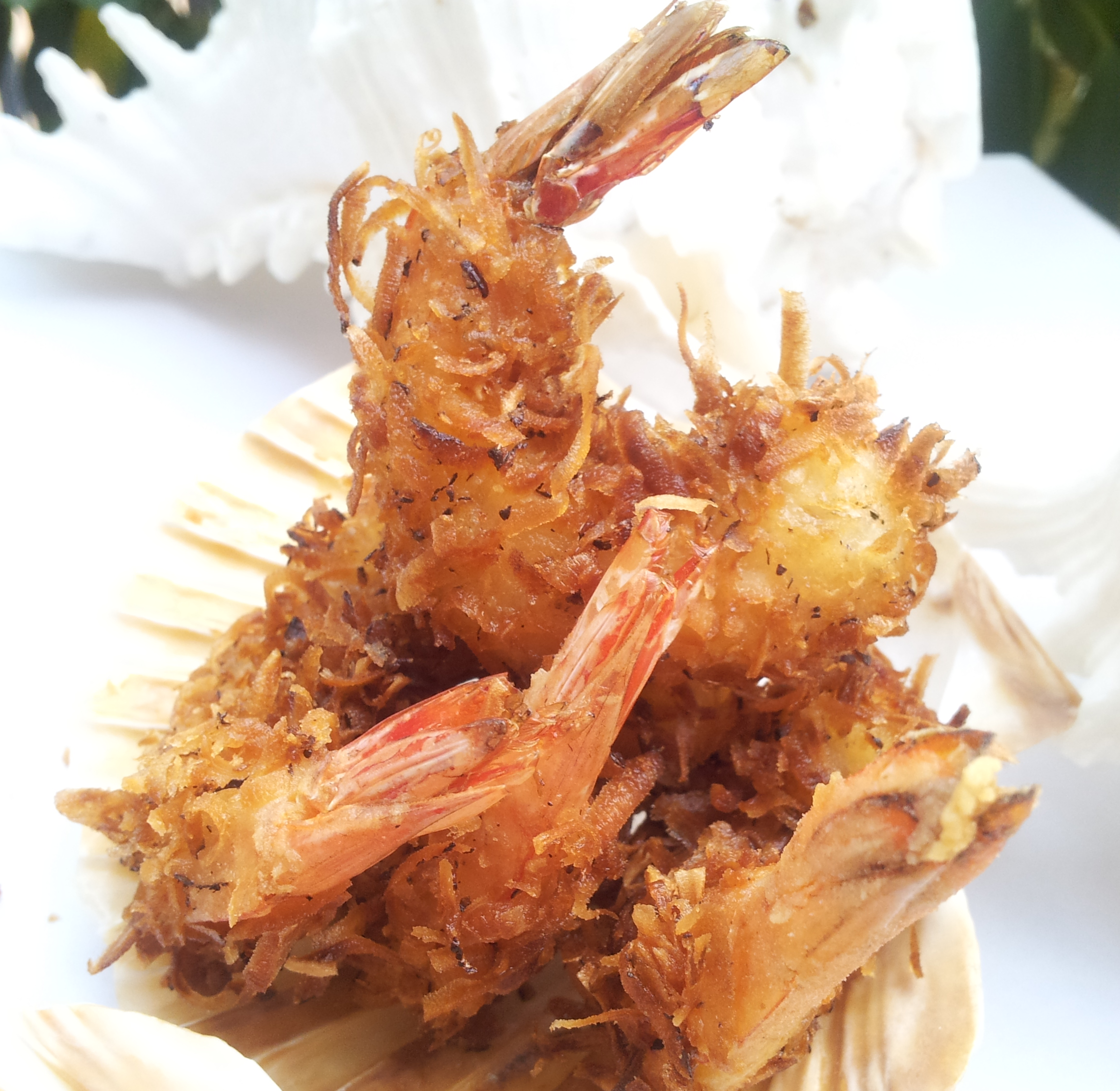
Coconut beer-battered shrimp

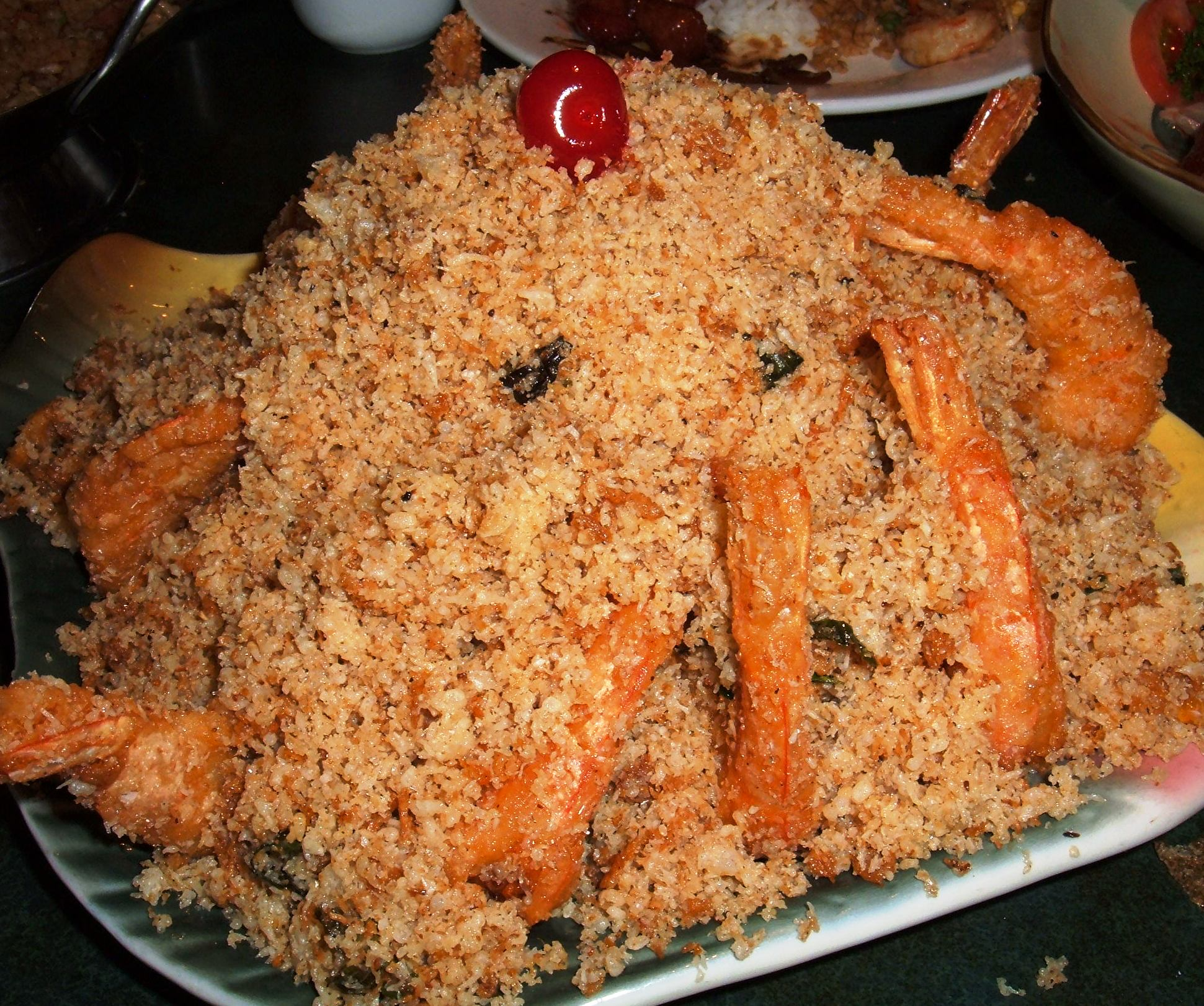
Coconut jumbo prawns

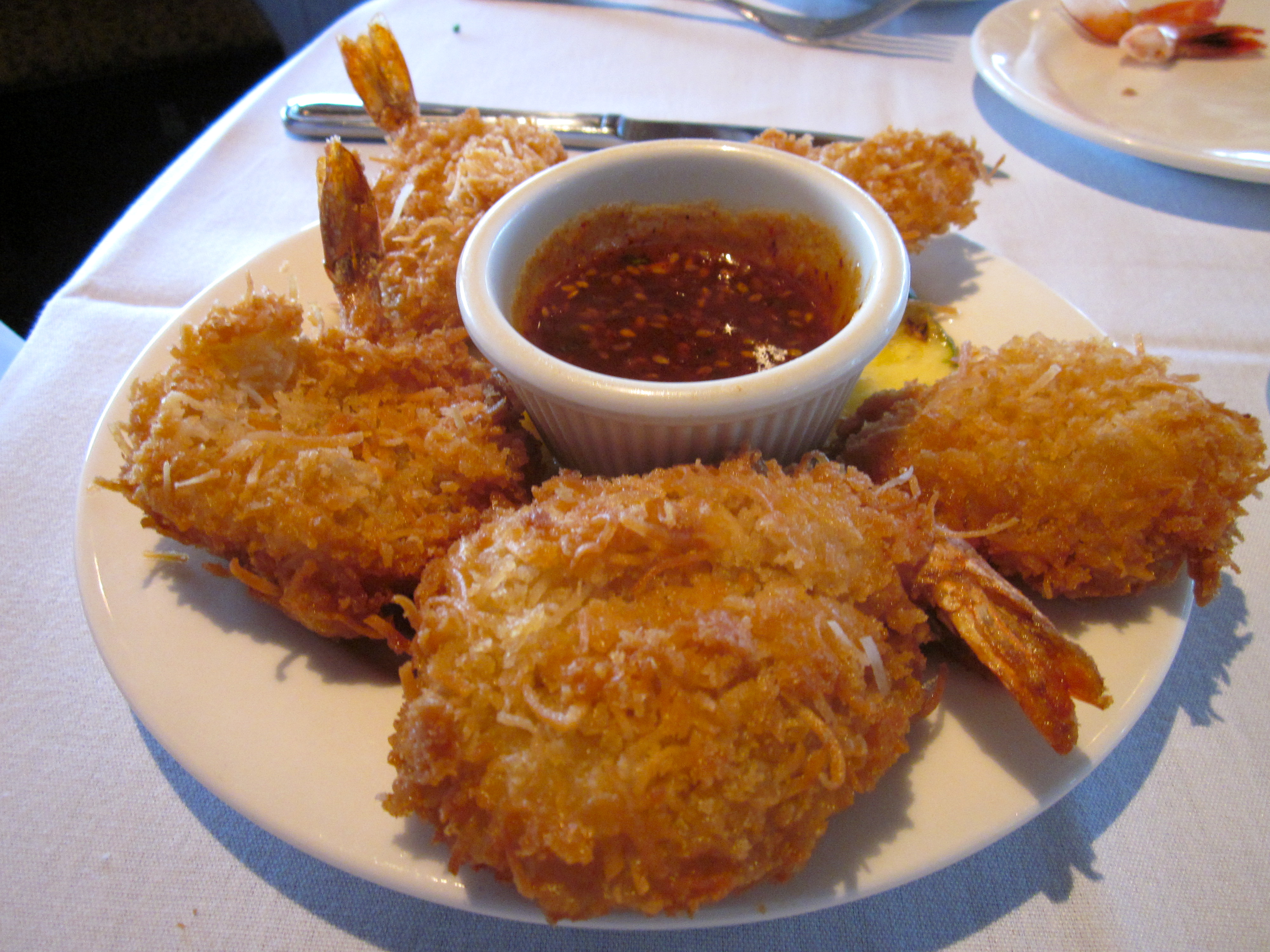
Coconut shrimp with sweet chili sauce

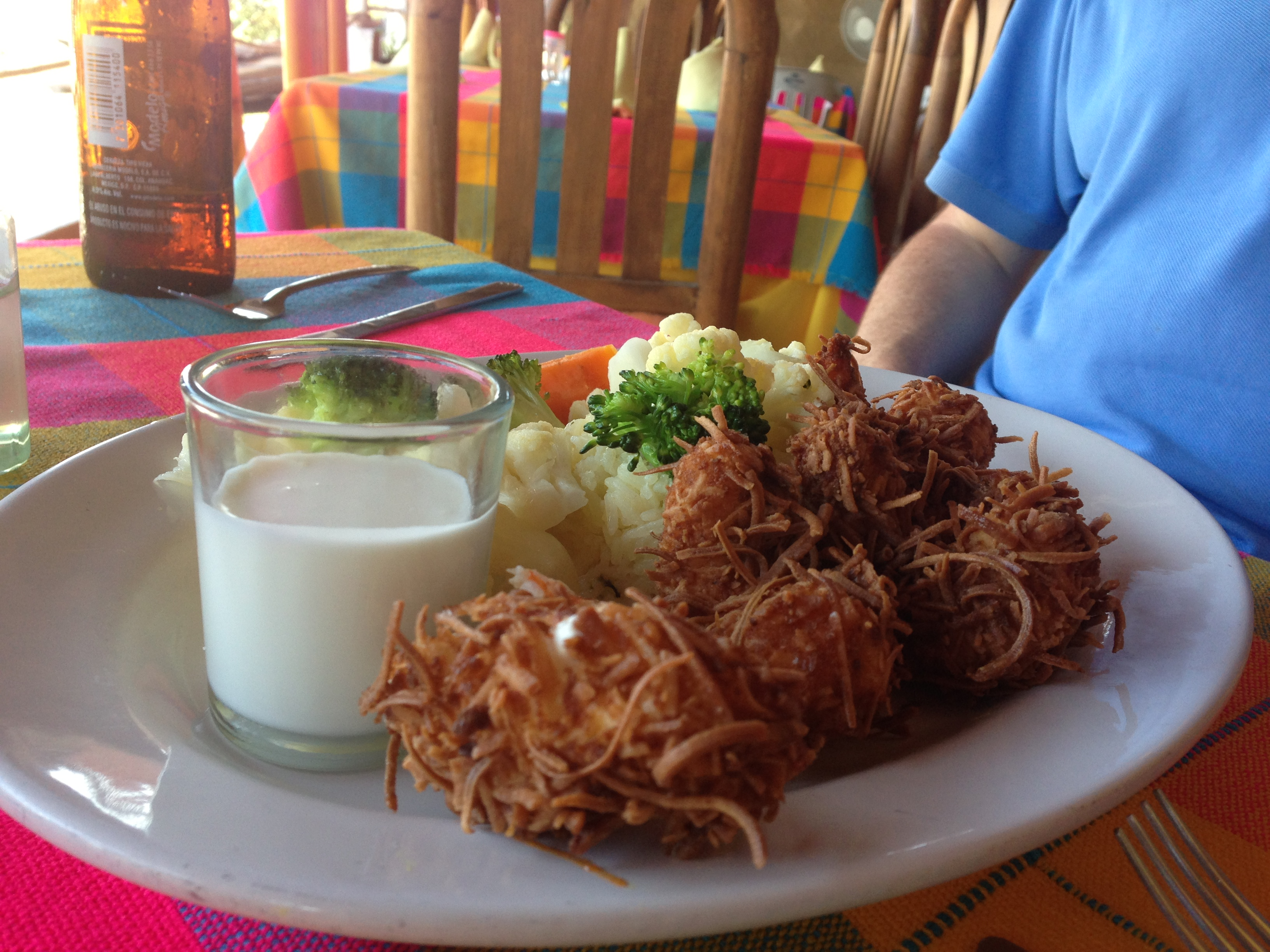
Coconut shrimp at a restaurant

== Coconut-milk based ==
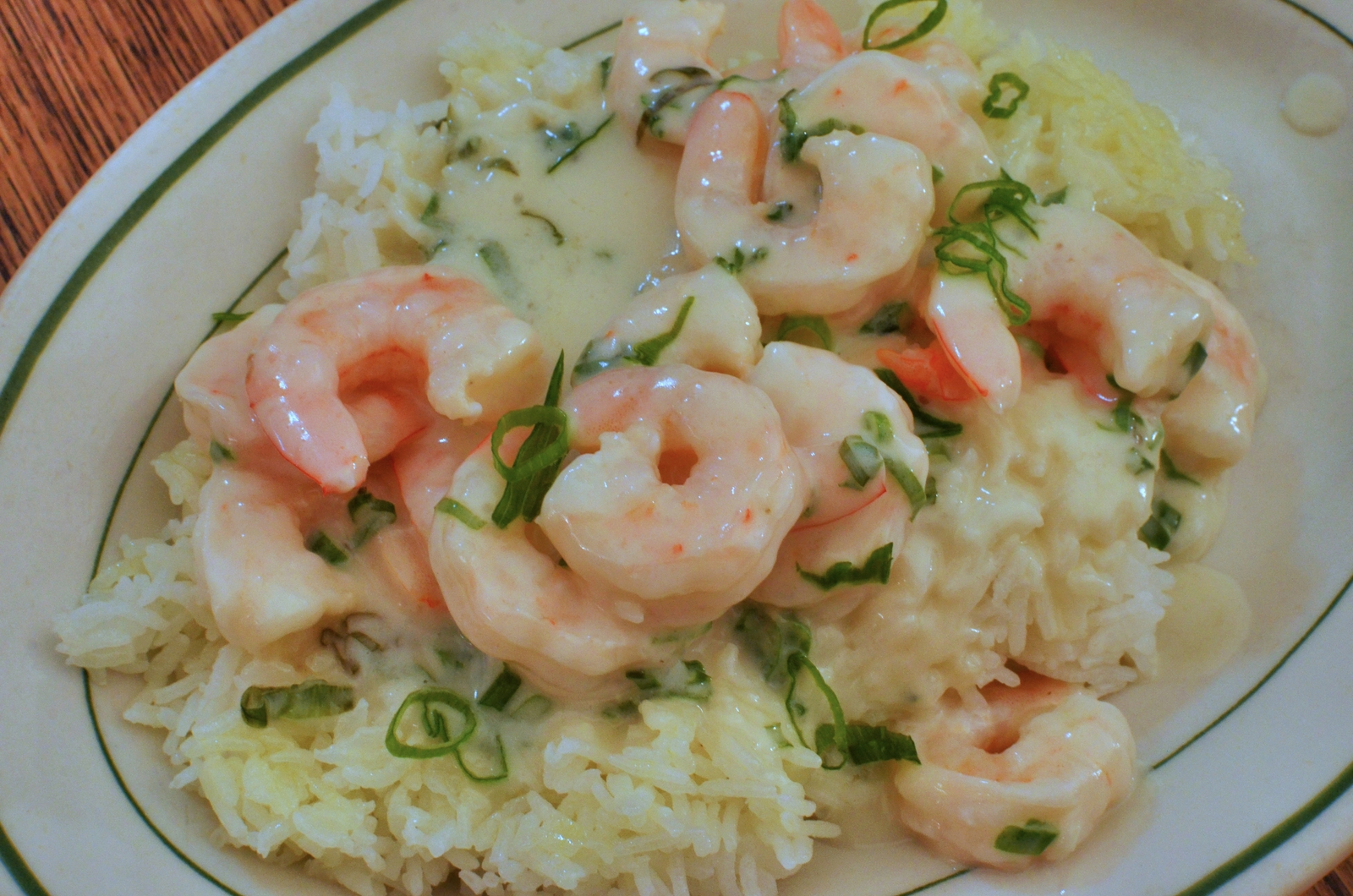
Coconut shrimp atop rice

A different dish, also called coconut shrimp, is prepared as a sautéed or stir-fried dish using coconut milk as an ingredient. This is often served atop rice. Additional ingredients can include onion, garlic, tomatoes, parsley, and various spices.

=== Skewered ===
Coconut shrimp prepared using coconut milk can be prepared kebab-style on skewers and may include marinating the shrimp in the coconut milk and other ingredients prior to cooking. Additional foods, such as pineapple, may be placed on the skewers. This dish can be cooked by grilling or in a pan and may also be accompanied with various dipping sauces.

== See also ==
- Ginataang hipon
- Pininyahang hipon
- List of deep fried foods
- List of shrimp dishes
- Fried shrimp
