= Sarsa na uyang =

Filipino dish of shrimp, coconut, and spices

- Alternative names: Sarsa
- Place of origin: Philippines
- Region or state: Romblon
- Main ingredients: Freshwater shrimp, shredded coconut, chili

Sarsa na uyang, or simply sarsa, is a Filipino dish made from pounded freshwater shrimp, shredded coconut, chilis, ginger, peppercorns and other spices wrapped in coconut leaves and boiled in coconut milk. It originates from the islands of Romblon. It is eaten paired with plain rice.

Pinais from the Southern Tagalog region, and Binabak of the northern areas of the Province of Antique are similar dishes but are wrapped in banana leaves instead of coconut leaves, and boiled in water instead of coconut milk.

== See also ==
- Linapay
- Halabos
- Ginataang hipon
- Shrimp paste
- List of seafood dishes
- List of shrimp dishes
