= Ginataang ampalaya =

Filipino stew made from bitter melon and tinapa

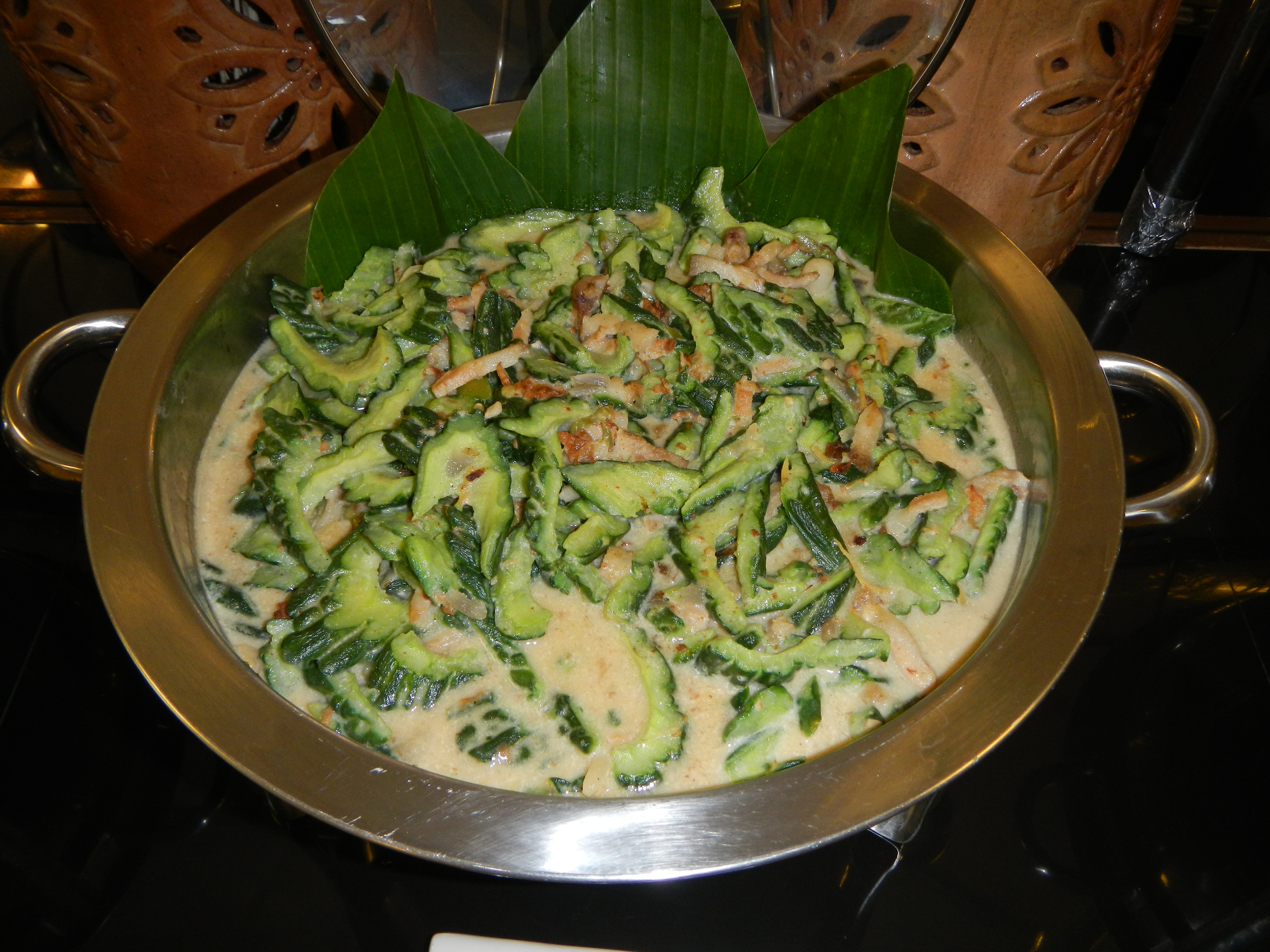
- Course: Main course
- Place of origin: Philippines
- Serving temperature: Hot
- Main ingredients: bitter melon, coconut milk, tinapa (smoked fish)

Ginataang ampalaya, is a Filipino vegetable stew made from bitter melon and tinapa (smoked fish) in coconut milk, bagoong alamang (shrimp paste), and spices. The dish can also be made with pork or shrimp and other vegetables. The dish is characteristically savory and slightly bitter due to the ingredients used. It is a type of ginataan.

== Description ==
The basic ingredients of ginataang ampalaya is bitter melon (ampalaya), tinapa (smoked fish), coconut milk, onions, garlic, salt, pepper, and bagoong alamang (shrimp paste, can be substituted with fish sauce or MSG). Pork or shrimp can also be added, along with other vegetables like moringa leaves (malunggay), tomatoes, and eggplants, among others. The dish can also be spiced with ginger as well as siling haba or labuyo peppers. A thickening agent like cornstarch or okra may also be added.

Ginataang ampalaya is prepared by first slicing the bitter melon lengthwise and removing the pulp. To minimize the bitterness of the bitter melon, the rind is then soaked in brine and slightly squeezed until it becomes tender. It is rinsed then soaked again in water. It is rinsed for the second time and then sliced into small pieces. Some recipes skip the rinsing steps if more bitterness is desired. The tinapa is shredded into flakes. The head of the fish is set aside and pounded with hot water before being filtered. The extract is saved for later.

The onions and garlic are sautéed in oil, along with the shrimp or pork if they are added. Water is added along with the tinapa flakes and the other vegetables and spices and allowed to boil. Once boiling, the bitter melon is added. Once the bitter melon is tender, the heat is reduced and the coconut milk and the liquid from the crushed tinapa is added. It is allowed to cook until the bitter melon absorbs the coconut milk broth. It is served over white rice.

In some versions, thin coconut milk is added first in place of water, followed by coconut cream.

== Variations ==
Ginataang ampalaya can be cooked with calabaza and other vegetables, in which case it becomes the more general dish ginataang gulay ("vegetables in coconut milk").

== See also ==
- Gising-gising
- Ginataang kalabasa
- Ginataang langka
- Coconut soup
- List of dishes using coconut milk
