= Ginataang kalabasa =

Filipino vegetable stew

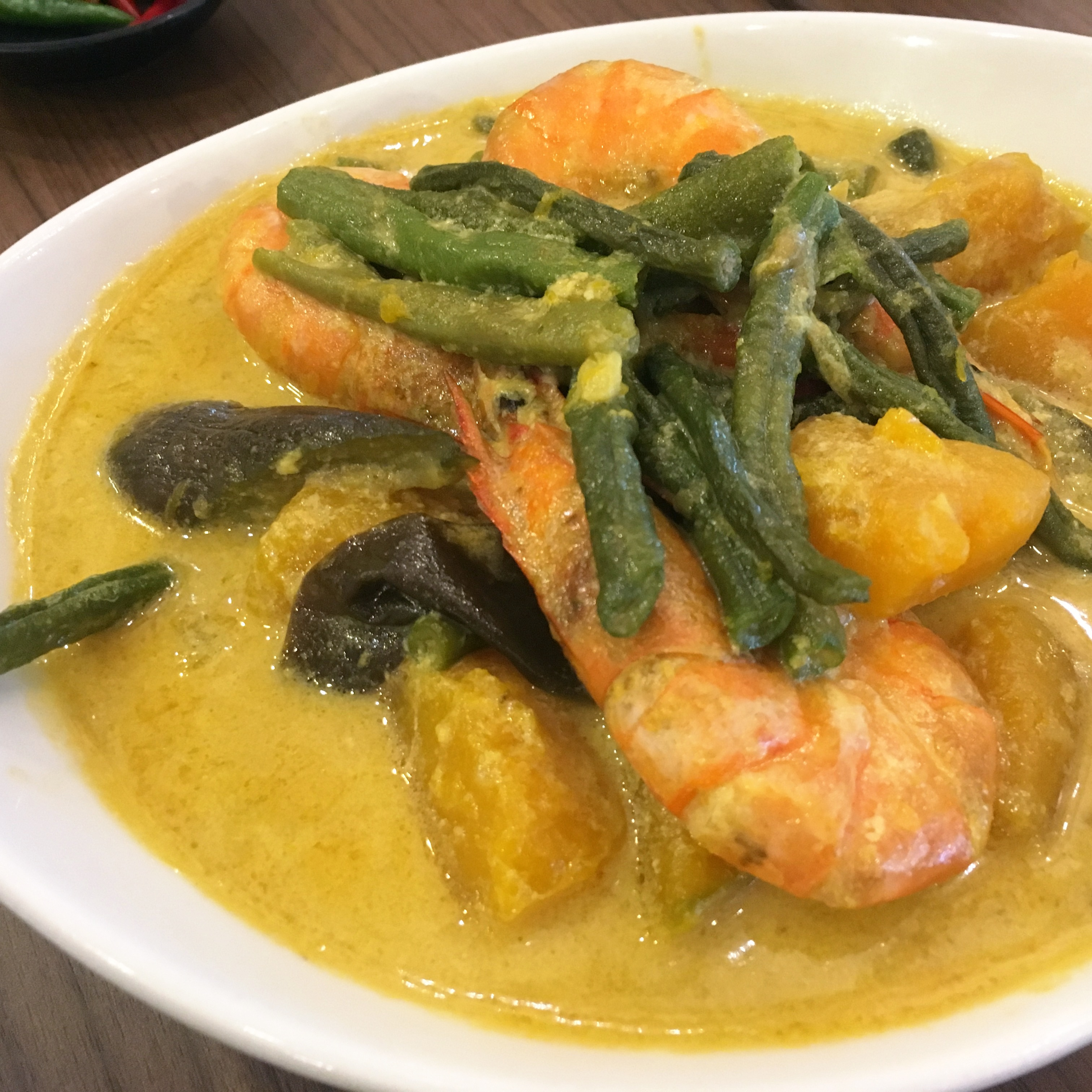
- Ginataang kalabasa with shrimp, yardlong beans, and eggplant
- Alternative names: Kalabasa sa gata, Nilatik na kalabasa, Squash in coconut milk, Kabasi ha gata Pinggata a babasal
- Course: Main course
- Place of origin: Philippines
- Serving temperature: Hot
- Main ingredients: calabaza, coconut milk

Ginataang kalabasa, also known as kalabasa sa gata, is a Filipino vegetable stew made from calabaza in coconut milk and spices. It commonly includes shrimp and yardlong beans and either bagoong (fermented fish or shrimp) or patis (fish sauce). It can also be cooked with fish, crab, or meat and a variety of other ingredients. It is a creamy umami-laden dish that is naturally slightly sweet due to the calabaza. It is a type of ginataan.

== Names ==
Ginataang kalabasa is found throughout the Philippines and is known under a variety of names. It is usually anglicized as "squash in coconut milk." It is also known as dinuldog in Cebuano, kalabasa sa gata in Tagalog, kabasi ha gata in Tausug, pinggata a babasal in Maguindanao and nilatik na kalabasa in Hiligaynon. The names can also change depending on the secondary ingredient, like ginataang kalabasa at hipon when shrimp is added, or ginataang kalabasa at sitaw when yardlong beans are added.

In some versions, the secondary ingredient is treated as the main ingredient, although they are still just variations of ginataang kalabasa. Examples include ginataang alimango (mud crabs) and ginataang alimasag (blue crabs), both of which still include calabaza.

When multiple vegetable ingredients are used, the more generalized term ginataang gulay ("vegetables in coconut milk") is also used to refer to the dish.

== Description ==
The basic recipe for ginataang kalabasa includes cubed calabaza (kalabasa, commonly known in Philippine English as "squash"), coconut milk (gata), coconut cream (kakang gata), ginger, onions, garlic, and either bagoong (fermented fish or shrimp) or patis (fish sauce), and salt and pepper to taste. For convenience, some modern versions substitute the shrimp paste or fish sauce with monosodium glutamate or commercial granulated seasoning. The garlic and onions are first sautéed in oil on a pan, then the coconut milk with the rest of the ingredients are added. It is cooked in low heat until the squash becomes very tender. The coconut cream is added last and cooked in low heat with constant stirring until the broth thickens.

== Variants ==
The dish is easily modified which results in multiple variants. The most common secondary ingredients for ginataang kalabasa are yardlong beans cut into five-centimetre (2.0 in) lengths and shrimp. Fish, crab, or meat (usually pork) can also be used. A spicy version is also common with the addition of siling haba and/or labuyo. Other ingredients can include moringa leaves (malunggay), tomatoes, squash blossoms, eggplant, and okra, among others. The calabaza can be substituted with butternut squash or kabocha, especially in western versions.

A vegan or vegetarian version of the dish can also be created by using mushroom sauce in place of fish sauce or shrimp paste and leaving out the meat and seafood.

Ginataang kalabasa is differentiated from other types of ginataan which may also use similar ingredients like ginataang hipon (shrimp in coconut milk) and ginataang ampalaya in that the latter dishes do not include calabaza.

== See also ==
- Kare-kare
- Ginataang langka
- Ginataang labong
- Gulai
- Coconut soup
- List of dishes using coconut milk
- List of stews
