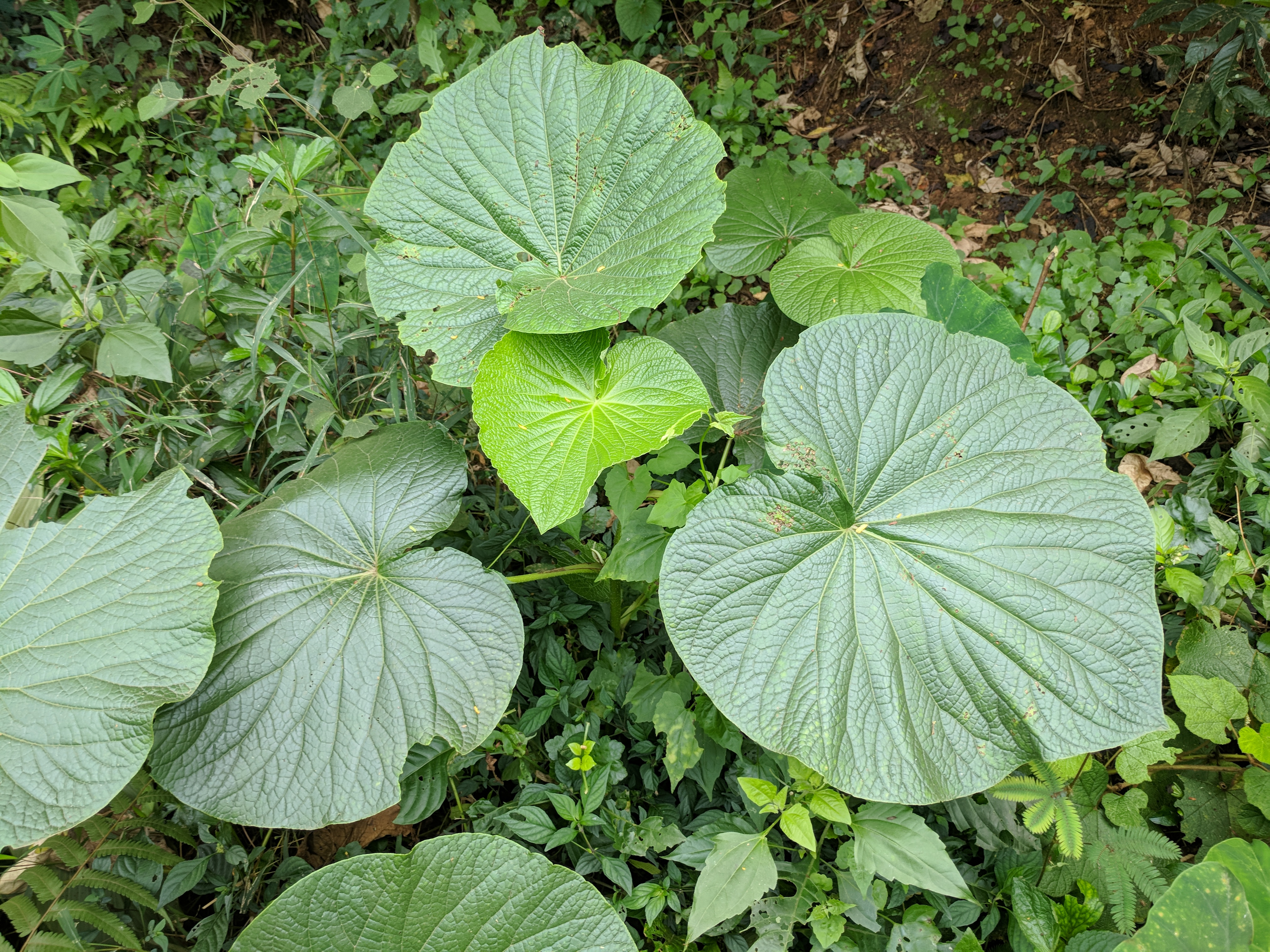

Scientific classification
- Kingdom: Plantae
- Clade: Tracheophytes
- Clade: Angiosperms
- Clade: Magnoliids
- Order: Piperales
- Family: Piperaceae
- Genus: Piper
- Species: P. umbellatum

Binomial name
- Piper umbellatum L.

Synonyms
- Heckeria umbellata (L.) Kunth; Pothomorphe umbellata (L.) Miq.

= Piper umbellatum =

Species of flowering plant

Piper umbellatum, commonly known as cow-foot leaf, is a species of pepper plant native to the Americas, including Mexico, Central America, the Caribbean, and tropical regions of South America. It has been widely naturalized in other tropical regions of the world.

== Names ==
Piper umbellatum is also known by a wide variety of local names, including pariparóba or caapéba in Brazil; acoyo, cordoncillo, or hierba santa in Spanish-speaking Latin America; kubamba (also kamamba or camamba) in the Philippines; gandamarom or attanari in India; lemba or lomba in Malaysia; and bumbu in Indonesia; among other names.

== Description and habit ==
Piper umbellatum is an herbaceous or woody shrub, reaching a height of 0.9 to 4 m (3.0 to 13.1 ft) tall. It has large heart-shaped leaves. The flower spikes are white to yellow in color. The fruits are brownish and shaped like an inverted pyramid. They grow in the undergrowth of evergreen forests, swamp forests, and along riverbanks.

== Uses ==
Parts of the plant is edible, commonly the young leaves and flowers are eaten steamed as a vegetable. The fruit can be eaten when ripe, and the bark can be used as a condiment. In the Philippines, where the plant has been introduced, it is used to wrap a steamed shrimp and grated coconut dish known as pinais.

The plant has been traditionally used in folk remedies for digestive and liver-related maladies. In 2002, a research group based at the Tokyo Medical and Dental University discovered antibacterial properties of the plant specific to Helicobacter pylori. Two years later in laboratory testing at the Pharmaceutical Sciences College (FCF) of the University of São Paulo, molecules found within the plant were demonstrated to have UVB-protective properties. For its medicinal and cosmetic promise, the Brazilian pharmaceutical company Natura obtained exclusive marketing rights to products developed from the plant.
