= Peach sauce =

Sauce made from peaches

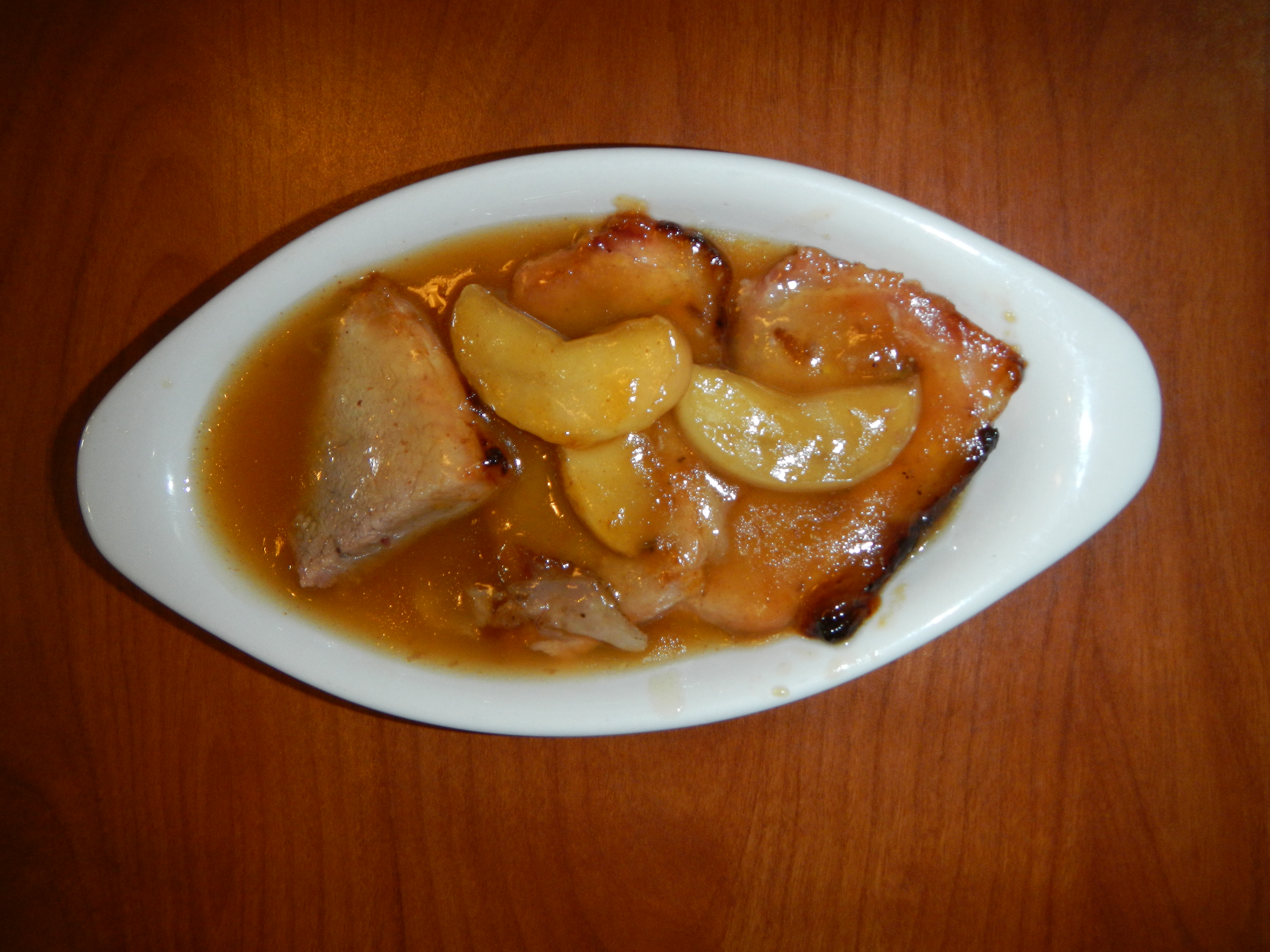
Pork with peach sauce

Peach sauce is used as an accompaniment in Chinese cuisine and other cuisines. It is also used in peach preserves and chutney.

Peach sauce may be used as a dessert sauce as a topping for pancakes and also on savory dishes, such as grilled chicken, coconut shrimp, and pork.

== See also ==
- List of Chinese sauces
