= Pinais =

Filipino cooking process

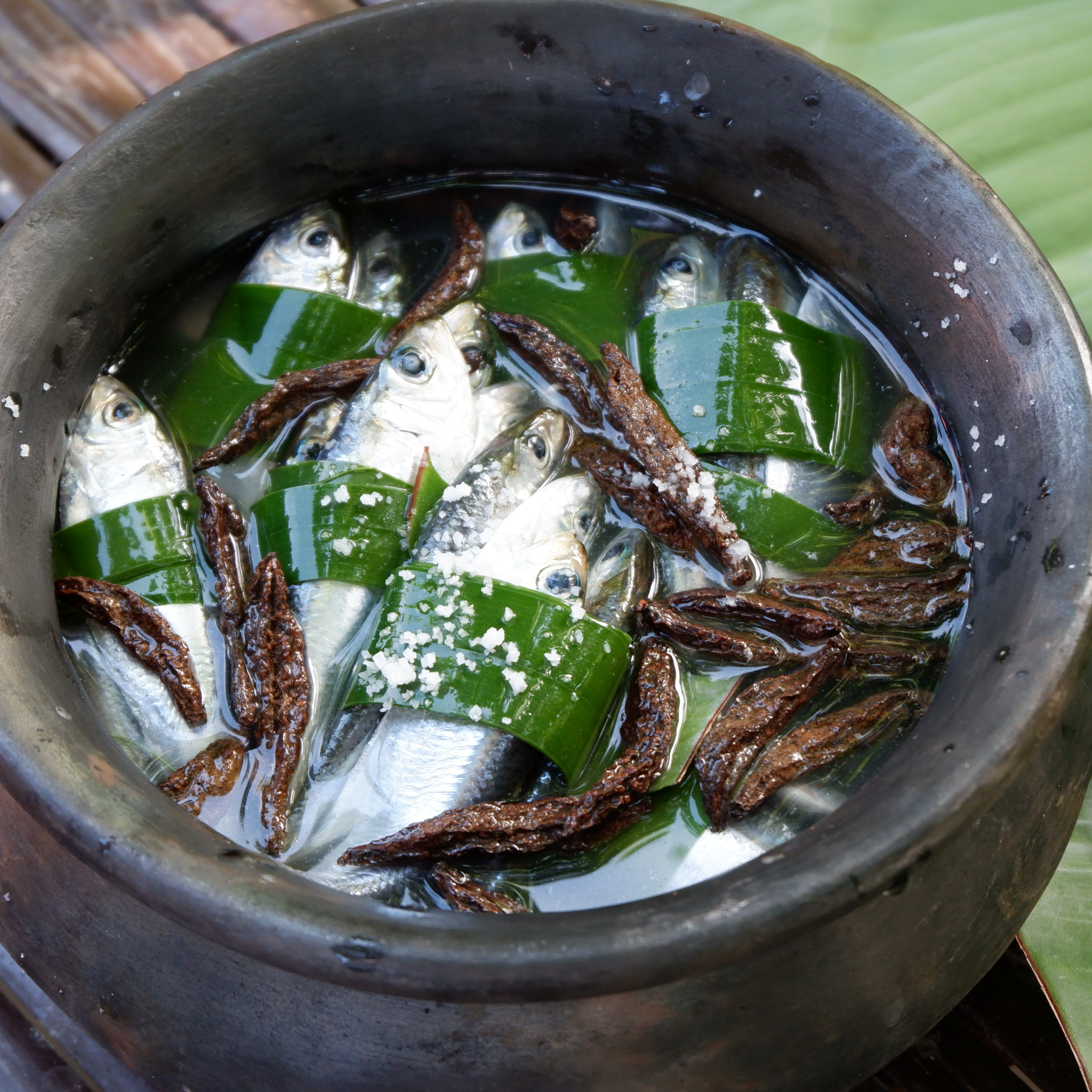
- Pinais na tawilis (freshwater sardines)
- Alternative names: Sinaing, Pinangat
- Course: Main course
- Place of origin: Philippines
- Region or state: Southern Tagalog
- Serving temperature: Hot
- Similar dishes: Paksiw, Laing, Pinangat na isda

Pinais is a Filipino style of cooking from the Southern Tagalog region consisting of fish, small shrimp, or other seafood and shredded coconut wrapped in banana and steamed or boiled in plain water or coconut water with sun-dried sour kamias fruits. It is also simply called sinaing (literally "cooked by boiling or steaming"). There are several types of pinais based on the main ingredients and their preparation can vary significantly. They are eaten with white rice.

Pinais is similar to pinangat except the latter is wrapped in taro leaves. The name also refers to the unrelated cassava suman in Pangasinan.

Binabak is a similar dish in the northern areas of the Province of Antique especially in the Municipality of Pandan. It uses a river shrimp called urang (Macrobrachium rosenbergii) especially the larger variety called patuyaw in the Karay-a language. The shrimp is peeled and pounded, and batwan leaves (Garcinia binucao), ginger, onion, garlic, and grated bangi-un—a type of coconut which is between buko (young coconut) and niyog (mature coconut) are added. Siling labuyo (Karay-a: kutitot) may also be added. All of this is wrapped in a banana leaf or tagikhik (Phrynium minutiflorum) in a similar fashion to suman, and then simmered in boiling water with salt.

Sarsa na uyang from the Province of Romblon is also similar but wrapped in coconut leaves instead of banana leaves, and boiled in coconut milk instead of water or coconut water.

== Types ==
=== Fish ===
Pinais na isda is typically made with blackfin scad (galunggong), freshwater sardine (tawilis), skipjack tuna (tulingan), tuna (tambakol), and others.

=== Shrimp ===
Pinais na hipon is typically made out of finely-chopped freshwater shrimp, coconut milk, and sometimes pork, wrapped in banana leaf and cooked in coconut milk. A unique variant from Quezon additionally wraps the shrimp and coconut in kamamba (Piper umbellatum) leaves.

=== Typical Ingredients and Cooking Method ===
The defining feature of Pinais is the preparation of seafood in parcels made from banana leaves. Common ingredients include fish or shrimp and grated coconut or coconut water. Cooking typically involves steaming or boiling the parcels to retain moisture and enhance flavor. Variations in richness or aroma depend on whether coconut milk, additional aromatics, or local leaves are included.

== See also ==
- Binakol
- Tiyula itum
- Paksiw
- Sinigang
- Philippine adobo
- Linarang
- Dinuguan
- Cuisine of the Philippines
