= Curacha Alavar =

Filipino dish

- Course: Main dish
- Place of origin: Philippines
- Region or state: Zamboanga City
- Created by: Maria Teresa Camins Alavar
- Invented: 1973
- Serving temperature: Hot, room temperature
- Main ingredients: Spanner crab, Alavar sauce

Curacha Alavar, sometimes referred to as curacha con salsa Alavar ("curacha with Alavar sauce") in Chavacano (a Spanish-based creole language), is a Filipino dish made from spanner crabs (curacha), garlic, ginger, salt, and Alavar sauce. The key ingredient is the Alavar sauce, a secret blend of coconut milk, taba ng talangka (crab roe paste), and spices.

It is a regional specialty of Zamboanga City. The sauce was invented by Maria Teresa Camins Alavar and originally served in the Alavar Seafood Restaurant. The restaurant now sells the original Alavar sauce recipe in packets. It is a variant of the traditional ginataang curacha (curacha in coconut milk). The recipe can also be made with mud crabs (cangrejo) or prawns (locon).

== See also ==
- Ginataan
- Ginataang hipon
- Halabos
