= Ginataang hipon =

Filipino seafood soup that does not use vegetables

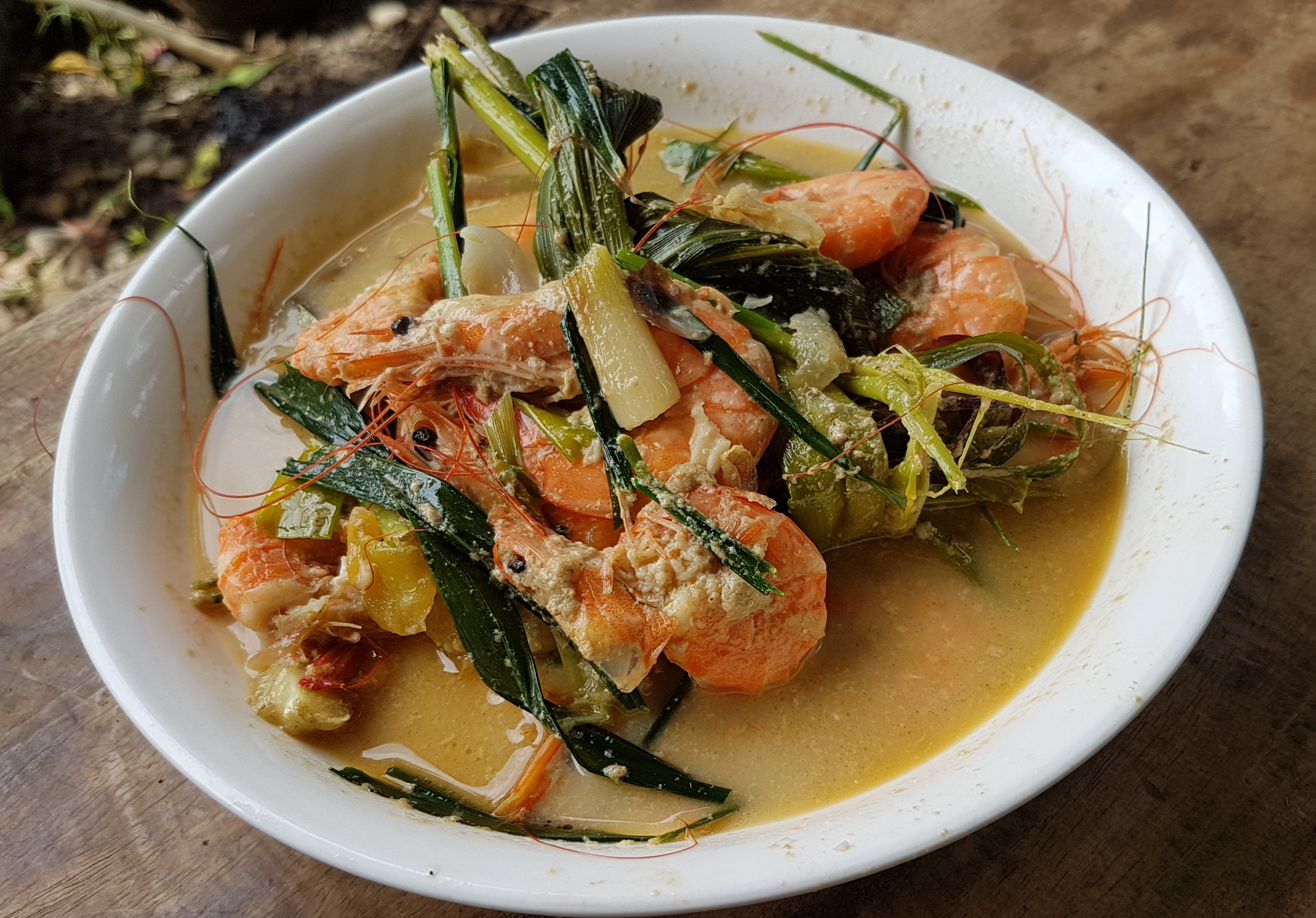
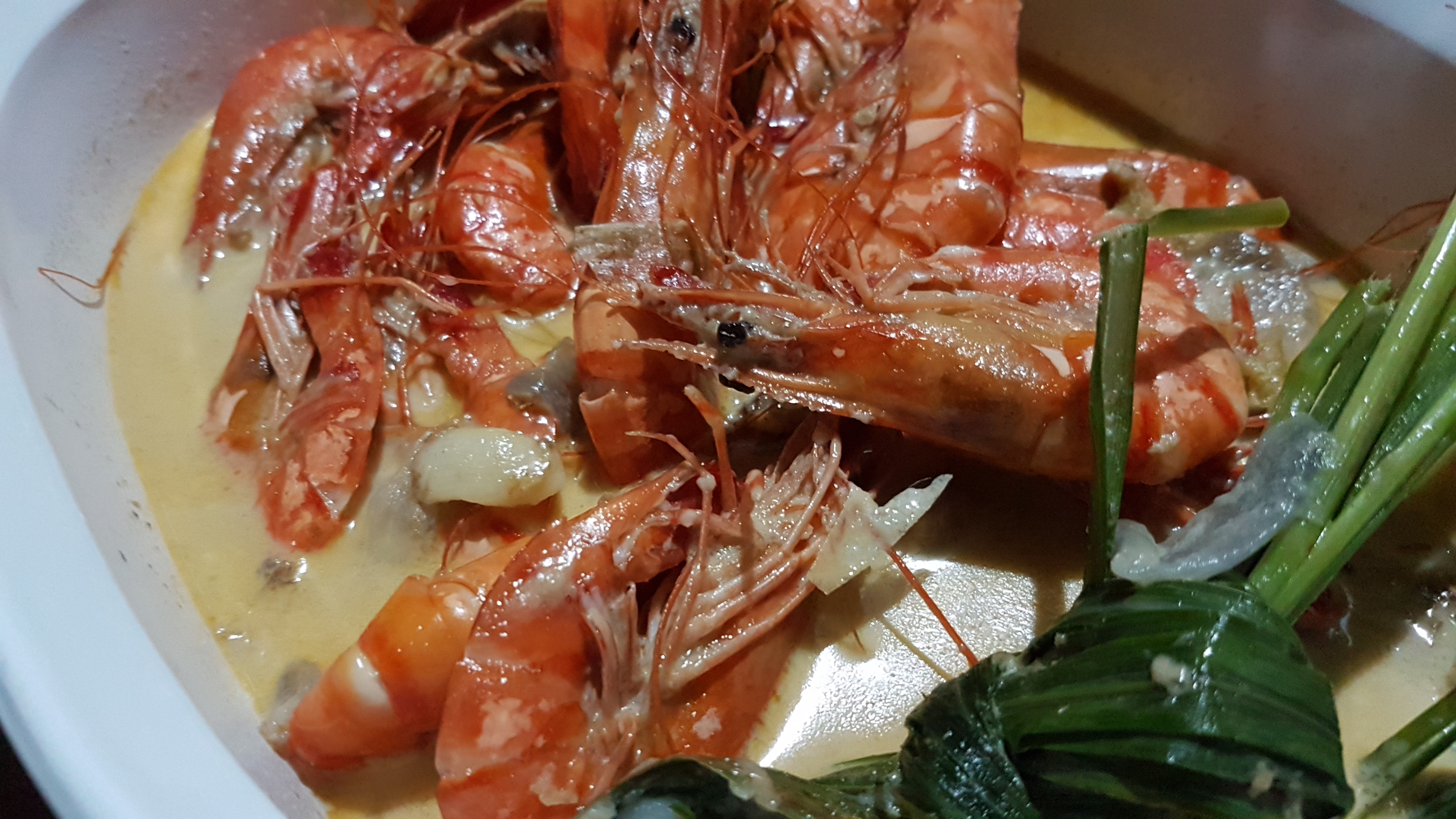
- Ginataang hipon with lemongrass
- Course: Main course
- Place of origin: Philippines
- Serving temperature: Hot
- Variations: Ginataang curacha (spanner crab); Ginataang sugpo (prawn or lobster)

Ginataang hipon is a Filipino seafood soup made from shrimp (hipon) in coconut milk (gata) and spices. It differs from other types of ginataan (which also commonly include shrimp), in that it does not use vegetables. It is a type of ginataan. Variants of the dish include ginataang curacha and ginataang sugpo, which use spanner crabs and prawn (or lobster), respectively, in place of shrimp.

== Description ==
Ginataang hipon is one of the simpler types of ginataan. The basic recipe includes unshelled shrimp with the heads intact, coconut milk, onion, garlic, ginger or turmeric, patis (fish sauce) or bagoong alamang (shrimp paste), and salt and pepper to taste. It can also be spiced with siling haba or labuyo peppers. The onion and garlic are first sautéed in oil in a pan, followed by the shrimp, then the rest of the ingredients are added until cooked. Some recipes prescribe boiling the coconut milk until it is reduced and oily, while others keep the dish soupy. Coconut cream is also preferred if available, instead of thin coconut milk. The dish does not normally include any type of vegetables. Some versions, however, add leafy vegetables, bamboo shoots (labong), tomatoes, cucumber, or a combination.

== Variants ==
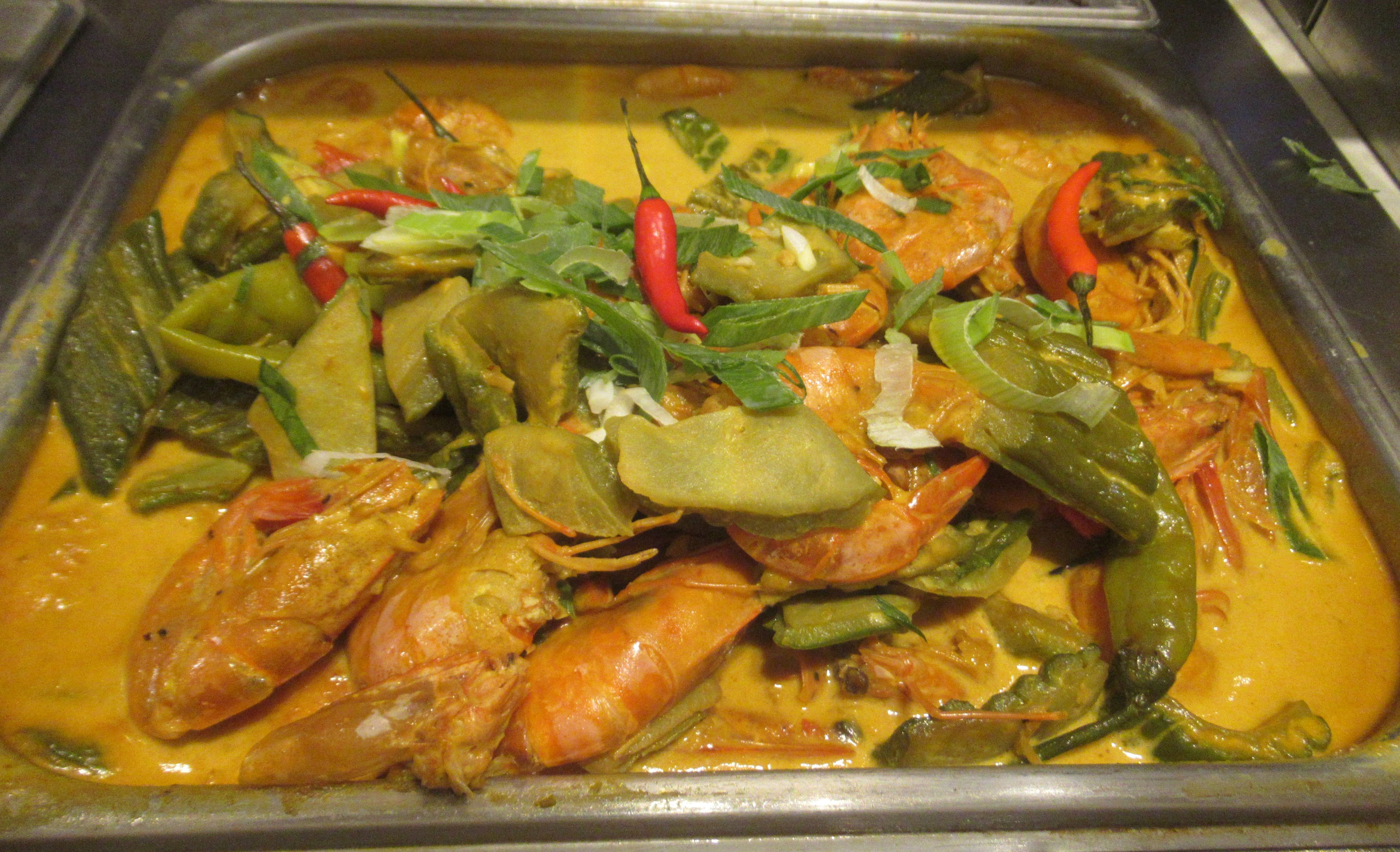
Ginataang ampalaya at hipon

Variants of ginataang hipon include ginataang curacha (which uses spanner crabs), ginataang sugpo (which uses prawns and lobsters), and ginataang ampalaya.

A notable variant of ginataang curacha is curacha Alavar.

== See also ==
- Coconut soup
- Halabos
- List of dishes using coconut milk
- List of soups
- Pininyahang hipon
