= Halabos =

Filipino cooking method

Halabós
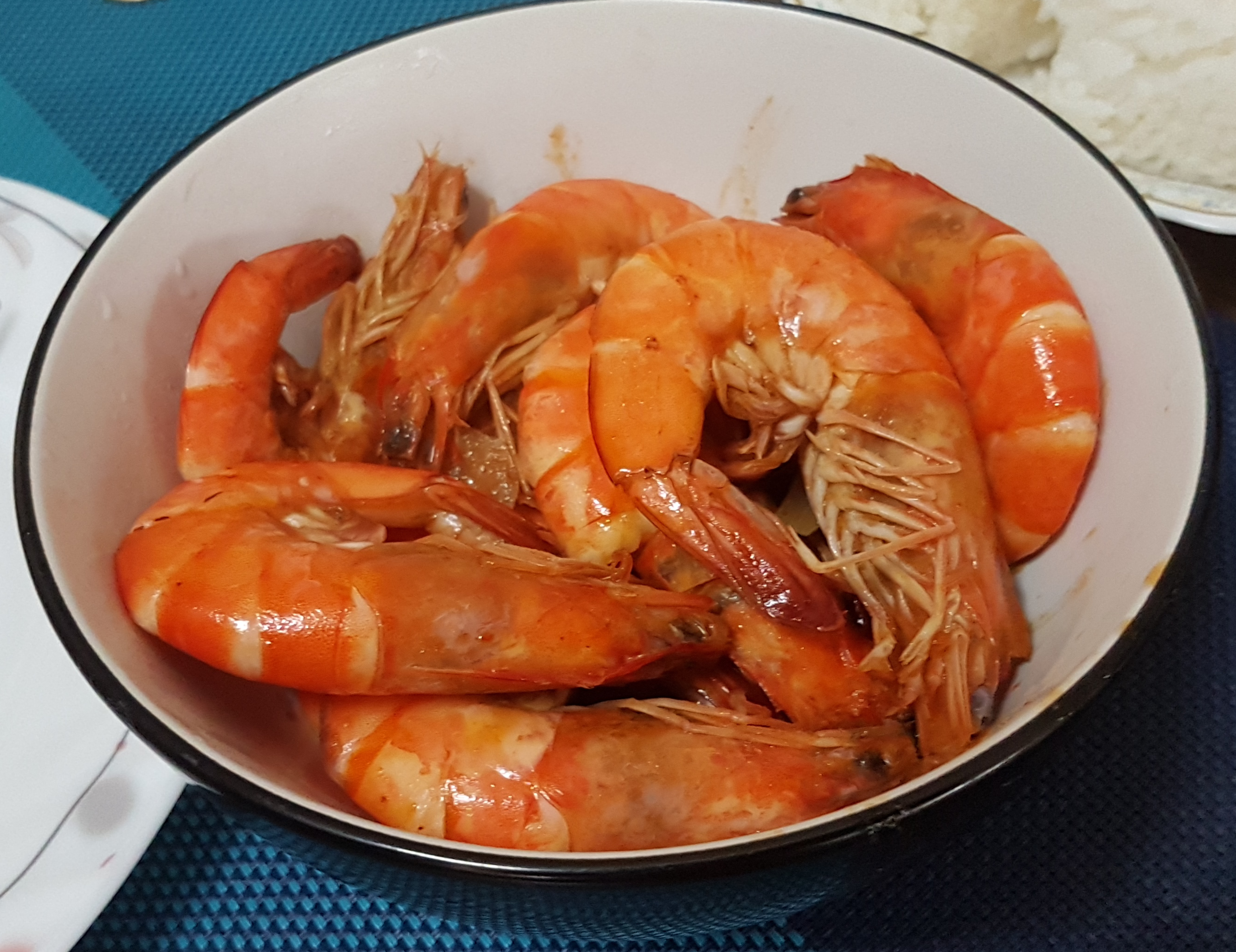
- Halabós na hipon
- Alternative names: Hinalabós, Hinalbós, Inalbós
- Course: Main dish
- Place of origin: Philippines
- Serving temperature: Hot

Halabós is a Filipino cooking process consisting of fresh shrimp, crab, or other crustaceans cooked in water and salt. Modern versions of the dish commonly add spices and use carbonated lemon drinks instead of water for a sweeter sauce.

== Etymology ==
Halabós (also spelled halbus, hablos, or halbos) is a verb meaning "to scald in saltwater" in the Tagalog language.

== Description ==
Halabós is one of the easiest and most common way of preparing crustacean dishes in the Philippines. Traditionally, it only requires boiling whole unshelled shrimp, crab, or other crustaceans in water and a little salt for one to three minutes until they turn reddish-pink. Nothing else is added, and the ingredients are allowed to stew in their own juices. However, modern versions generally use carbonated lemon drinks like Sprite instead of water. Spices may also be added like chilis and garlic. Butter may also be added.

Halabós dishes are usually prefixed by "halabós na". Examples of halabós dishes include halabós na hipon or halabos na sugpo (shrimp or prawns), halabós na alimango (mud crab), halabós na alimasag (blue swimmer crab), and halabos na ulang (lobster or giant river prawns). A specialty in Zamboanga is halabos na curacha which is made from curacha (the spanner crab, Ranina ranina).

== See also ==
- Camaron rebosado
- Curacha
- Curacha Alavar
- Ginataang hipon
- List of seafood dishes
- List of shrimp dishes
- Okoy
- Pininyahang hipon
