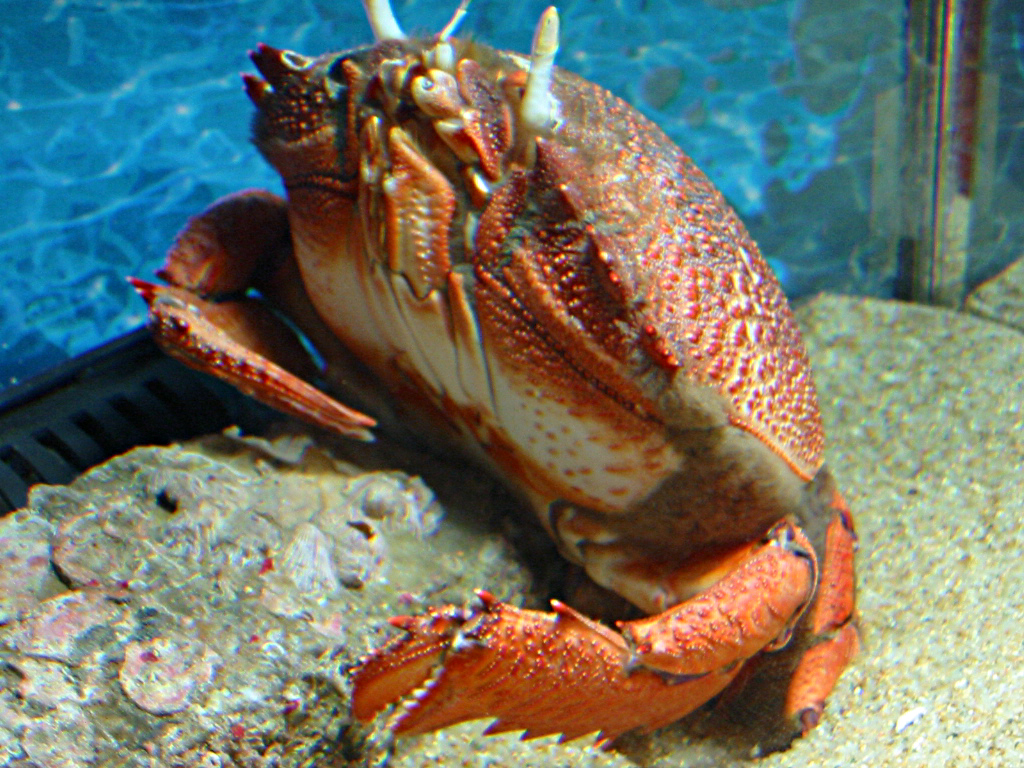

Scientific classification
- Kingdom: Animalia
- Phylum: Arthropoda
- Clade: Pancrustacea
- Class: Malacostraca
- Order: Decapoda
- Suborder: Pleocyemata
- Infraorder: Brachyura
- Family: Raninidae
- Genus: Ranina
- Species: R. ranina

Binomial name
- Ranina ranina (Linnaeus, 1758)

Synonyms
- Cancer ranina Linnaeus, 1758; Hippa scabra Fabricius, 1787; Ranina cristata Desjardins, 1835; Ranina dentata Latreille, 1825; Ranina scabra (Fabricius, 1787); Ranina serrata Lamarck, 1801

= Ranina ranina =

Species of crab

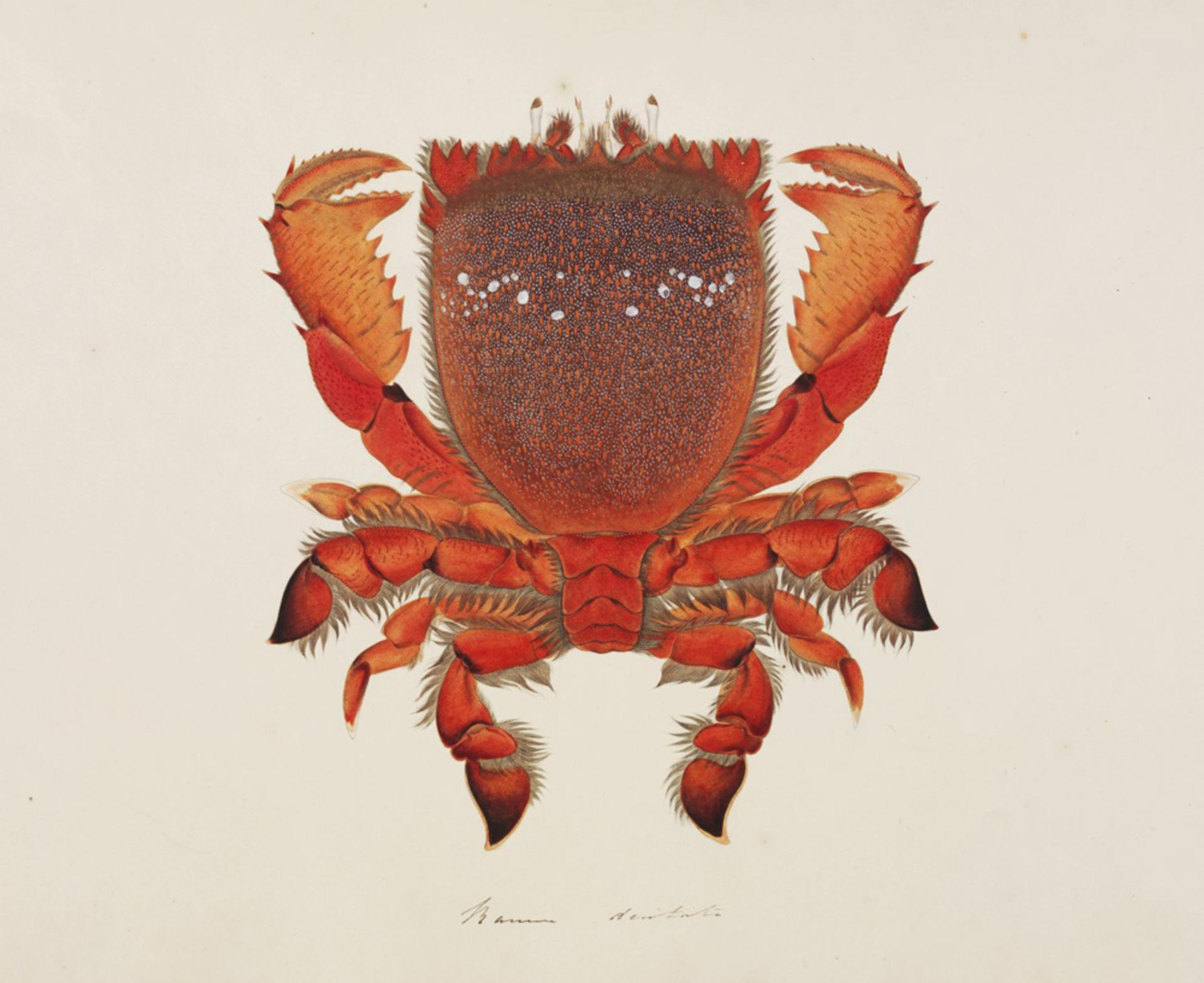
Ranina ranina by Kawahara Keiga, 1823 - 1829. Siebold Collection.

Ranina ranina, also known as the Huỳnh Đế crab, (red) frog crab or spanner crab, is a species of crab found throughout tropical and subtropical habitats. It is often fished for its meat.

== Description ==
It may grow up to 15.0 centimetres (5.9 in) long, and may weigh up to 900 grams (2.0 lb). The carapace is wider at the front, reddish brown in color, with ten white spots. Ranina ranina is mainly nocturnal, and remains buried in the sand during the day. Ranina ranina is easily distinguished from other crab species in its habitat due to its red carapace and elongated midsection.

== Distribution and ecology ==
Spanner crabs inhabit coastal waters along the east coast of Australia, from Yeppoon in Queensland to the North coast of New South Wales. There is also a population to the north of Perth in Western Australia. Ranina ranina is abundant in the coastal waters of south-western Mindanao, Philippines. These crabs are also found in the eastern coast of Africa, across the Indian Ocean to Indonesia, Japan and Hawaii and Vietnam.

Ranina ranina inhabits depths of 10–100 metres (30–330 ft) on sandy-smooth substrata in which they bury themselves from where they attack small bottom-dwelling fish. When waiting for prey, Ranina ranina will cover itself with sand, but leave its eye and mouthparts sticking out to help detect its food. Offshore areas within this range in a subtropical or tropical environment serves as a habitat for Ranina ranina, but they must have ample sand for Ranina ranina to flourish, as covering themselves in sand is instrumental in their method of catching prey.

== Fishery ==
The species is commercially exploited over much of its range, but the largest fishery is in Australia, where the annual commercial catch an estimated at 3,592 tonnes (7,919,000 lb). In Queensland, only adults above 100 mm (3.9 in) carapace length may be landed. In the Philippines in 2008, prices for Ranina ranina were around 200–300 pesos per kilogram. Ranina ranina populations have been surveyed to avoid overfishing and are currently stable.

Although Ranina ranina is a target of commercial fishing operations, little is known about the species' biology, population dynamics and ecology. Attempts have been made to grow Ranina ranina in captivity, but have so far been met with little success.

== Culinary use ==
Ranina ranina is a regional specialty in some regions of the Philippines where it is known as curacha. It is generally eaten steamed as halabos, or cooked in coconut milk as ginataan. A notable variant of the latter is the curacha Alavar of Zamboanga City.

In Vietnam the species is named as "Huỳnh Đế crab", which literally means "emperor crab". The names refer to the fact that R. ranina is one of the favorite high-ranked cuisine of historical Vietnamese monarchs. It is the delicacy harvested in the provinces Bình Định and Quảng Ngãi, and is hailed "monarch of all the crab".
