= Calabaza =

Type of squash

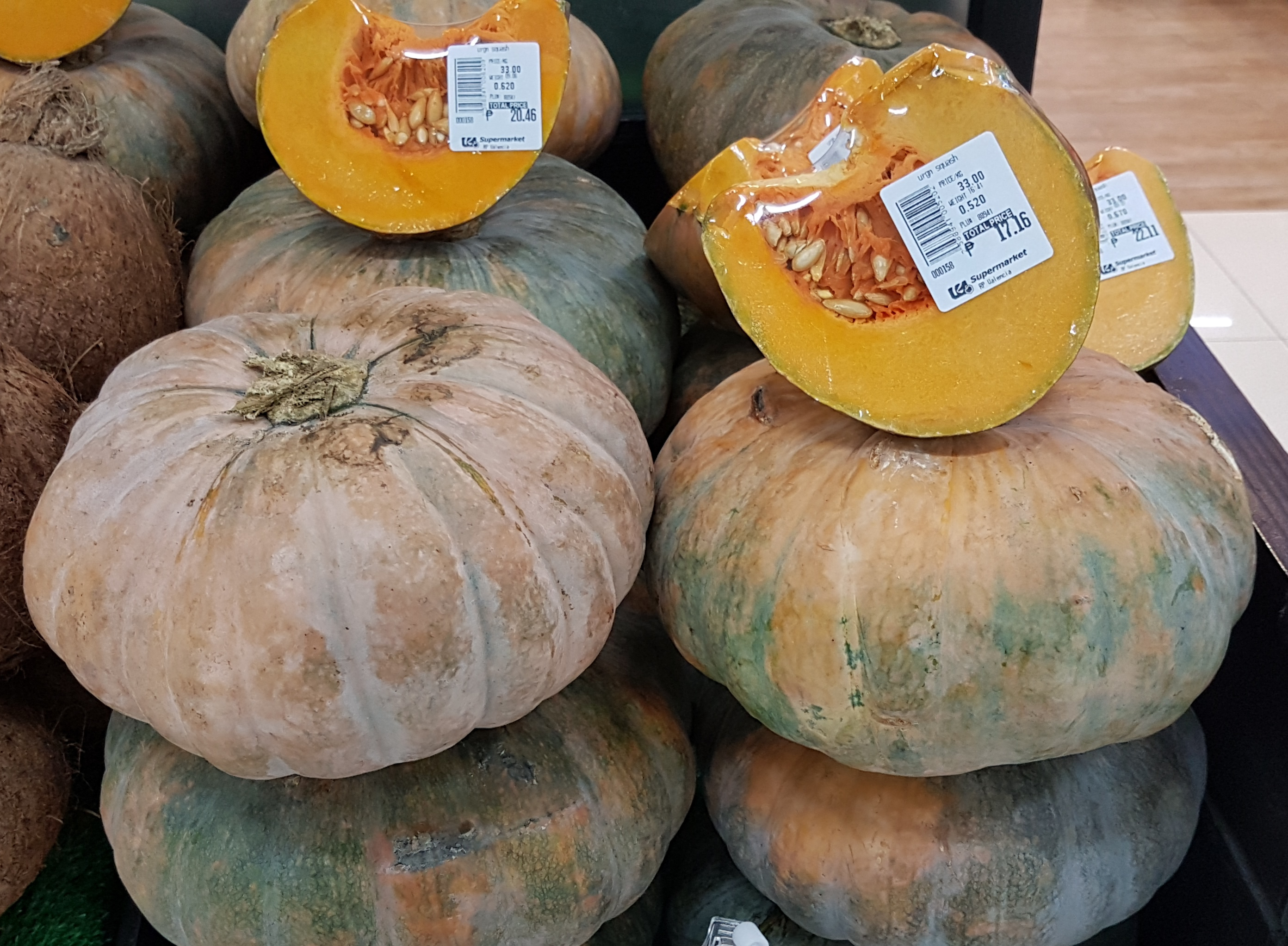
Calabaza fruits for sale in a supermarket in the Philippines

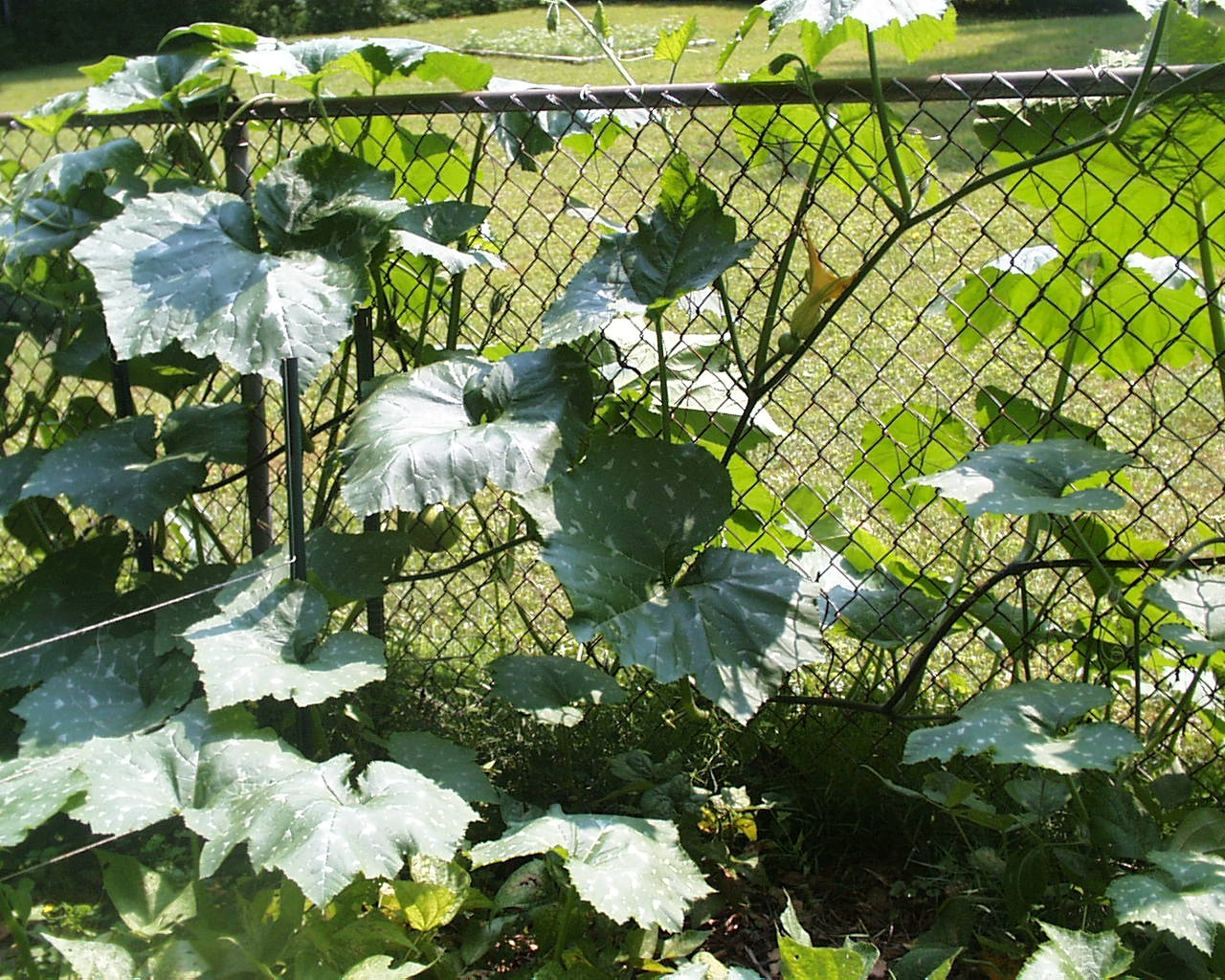
Calabaza vine

Calabaza is the generic name in the Spanish language for any type of winter squash. Within an English-language context it specifically refers to the West Indian pumpkin, a winter squash typically grown in the West Indies, tropical America, and the Philippines. Calabaza is the common name for Cucurbita moschata in Cuba, Florida, Puerto Rico, Mexico and the Philippines (where it is also spelled kalabasa). C. moschata is also known as ahuyama in Colombia, the Dominican Republic and Venezuela; ayote in Central America; zapallo in certain countries of South America; and "pumpkin", "squash", or "calabash" in English-speaking islands.

== Etymology ==
The French term calebasse, and hence the English "calabash", is based on the older Spanish. The Spanish word is of pre-Roman origin. It comes from the Iberian calapaccu, from -cal which means house or shell. It is a doublet of carapace and galapago.

== Cultivars ==
In North America, the Spanish word calabaza may refer to any of several species of squash of the genus Cucurbita. The term is most commonly used for cultivars of the species C. moschata, which is native to the Caribbean. The skin color typically varies from dark green to light yellow. The flesh can also vary in color, but most common is bright orange or yellow. Varieties differ somewhat in taste and texture, but are generally slightly sweet with a firm but soft texture. Cultivars of the species C. maxima may also use the term if they resemble the C. moschata cultivars, and widespread species C. foetidissima specifically identifies "calabaza" as one of its common names.

== Botanical description ==
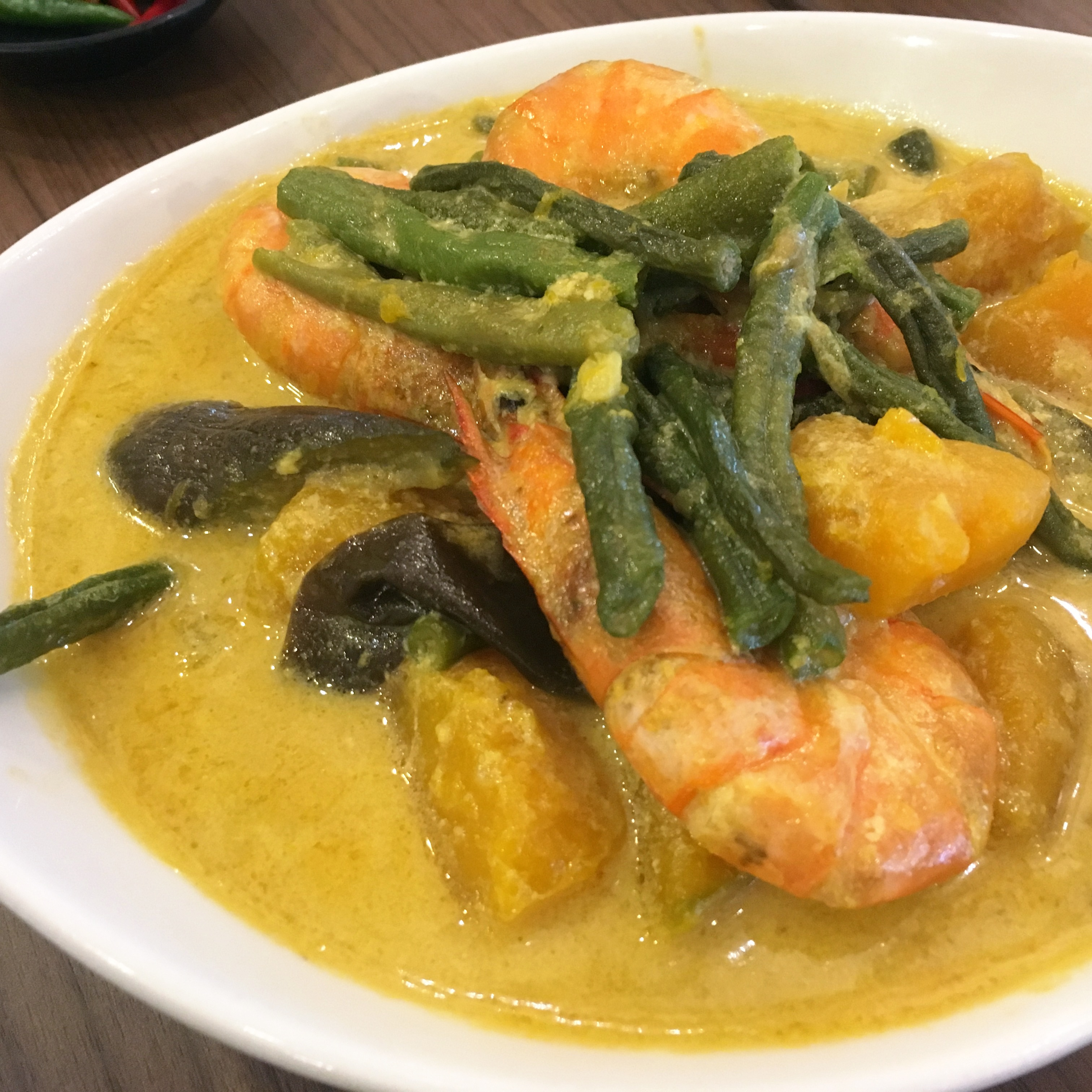
The Filipino dish ginataang kalabasa (calabaza with string beans and shrimp in coconut milk)

Calabaza plants are monoecious and are pollinated by insects like honeybees and bumblebees. The plants have long internodes and vines that are up to 15 metres (50 feet) from the crown of the fruit to the plant. Most plants have vine-type growth; however, there are some Cucurbita moschata that are recorded to have bush-type growth. They typically yield between two and fifteen fruits, but the bush types provide higher yields. The fruit may weigh 2 to 23 kilograms (5 to 50 pounds), and fruit shape varies from oval, spheroid, obovate, pear, oblate, to elliptic. Improved types tend to be spheroid, oblate or flat. The rind varies in color from a light to dark green when immature and a light orange to beige when mature, and can be smooth or warted. The inside flesh is green-yellow to orange in color and is about 3 to 8 centimetres (1 to 3 inches) thick.

== Uses ==
Calabaza is eaten many different ways, such as in stews, cakes, and candies. It can also be used in place of pumpkin varieties. The taste is smooth and somewhat sweet. Calabaza is a good source of beta-carotene, some of which can be converted into vitamin A.

Under Spanish colonial influence, C. moschata became established in the Philippines and is a staple vegetable used in a variety of dishes. It is known in Filipino as kalabasa, or in Philippine English as "squash" or "pumpkin".

The flower (flor de calabaza) is used as an ingredient in quesadillas, empanadas and other dishes in Mexican cuisine and New Mexican cuisine, and in pupusas in Salvadoran cuisine. The flowers (bulaklak ng kalabasa) are also commonly eaten stuffed (relyeno or relleno), or as ingredients in soups in Philippine cuisine, along with young leaves (talbos ng kalabasa).

The seeds, toasted and seasoned, known as pepitas, are a common snack.

In Indo-Carribean cuisine it is used for pumpkin takari or 'fry pumkin'.

== See also ==
- Kabocha
- Butternut squash
