= Pininyahang hipon =

Filipino dish

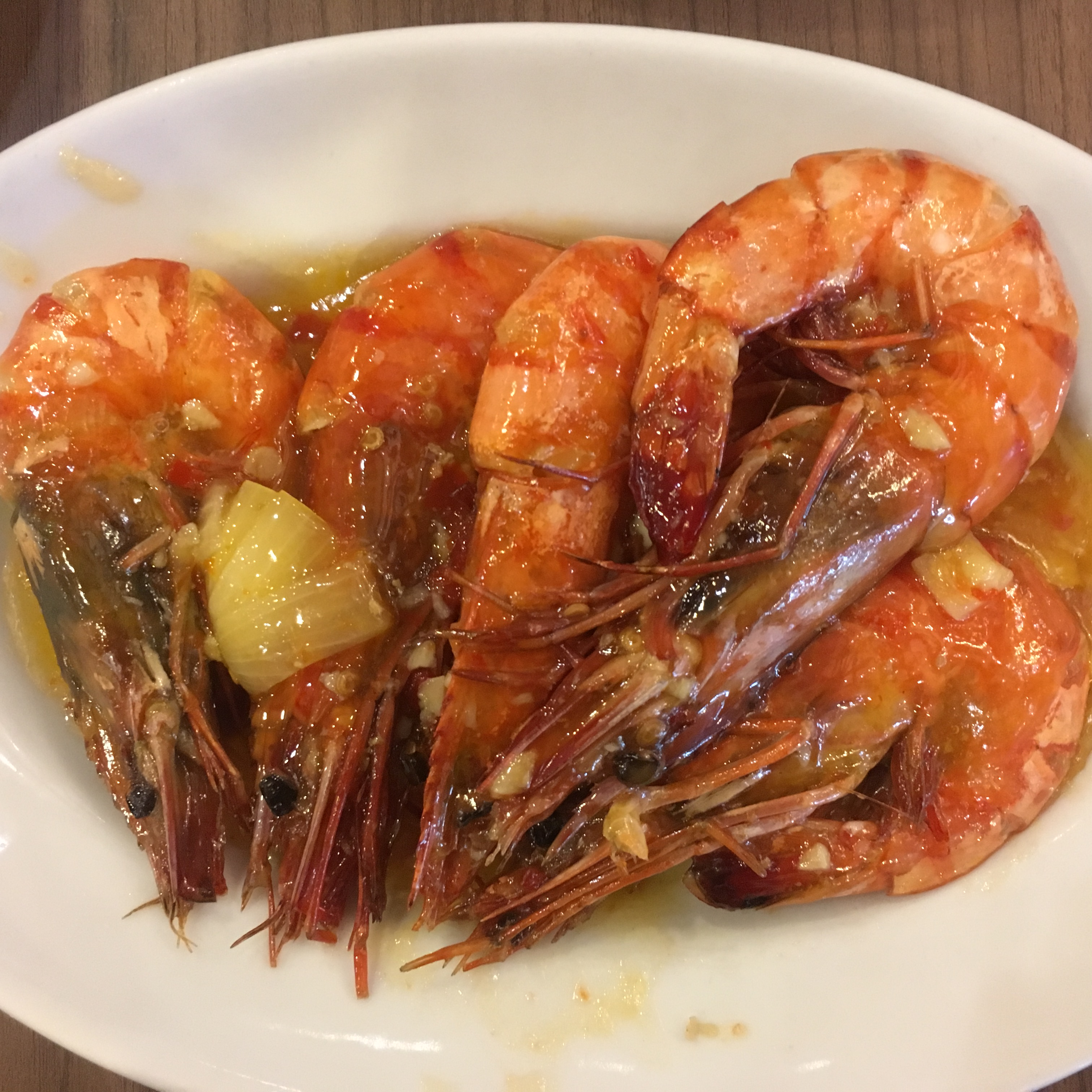
- Course: Main dish
- Place of origin: Philippines
- Serving temperature: Hot

Pininyahang hipon (lit. "shrimp with pineapples"), is a Filipino dish consisting of shrimp cooked in coconut milk, pineapples, tomatoes, onions, and various spices. It is a sweet variant of ginataang hipon (shrimp in coconut milk). It is commonly cooked with leftover shrimp from halabos na hipon dishes.

== See also ==
- List of shrimp dishes
- Pininyahang manok
