= Coconut cream =

Coconut ingredient

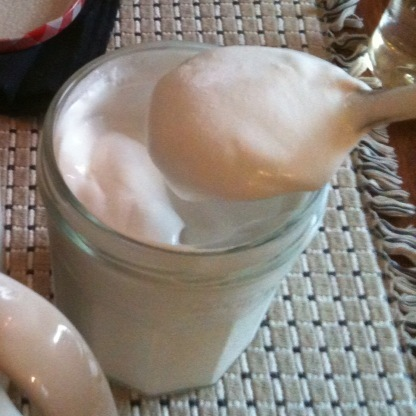
Coconut cream

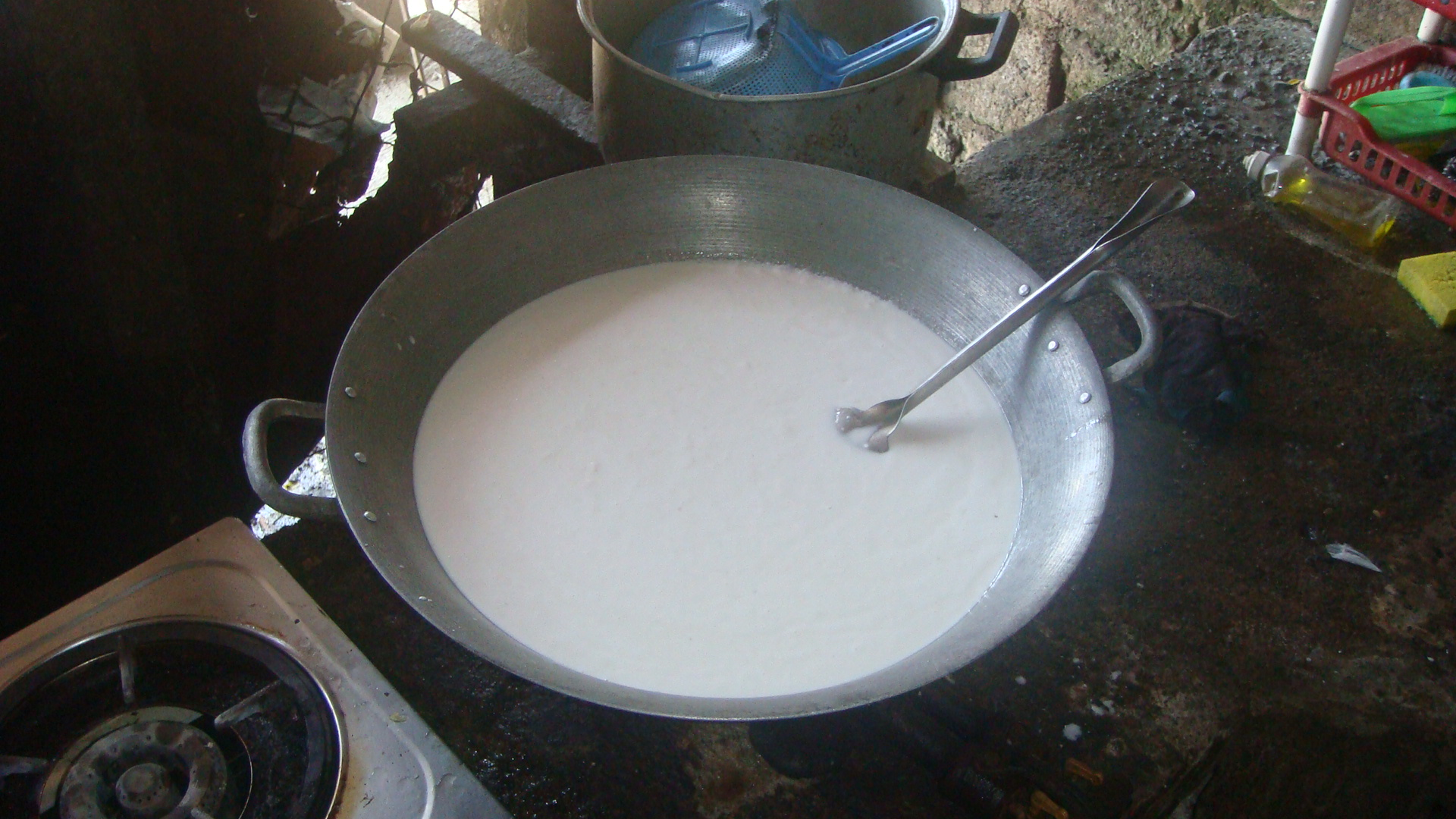
Coconut milk is a component of coconut cream

Coconut cream is similar to coconut milk, but is thicker due to a higher concentration of coconut and a lower amount of water in a ratio of about 4:1. Coconut cream is used as an ingredient in cooking, and has an unsweetened flavor.

Cream of coconut is a sweetened version of coconut cream used in desserts and beverages, such as the piña colada. Cream of coconut is a key ingredient in various desserts originating from Southeast Asian countries.

Creamed coconut (sometimes referred to as coconut butter) is a block made by pressing slightly dehydrated coconut flesh; it is sold as a waxy solid.

== See also ==
- Coconut
- Coconut water
