= Eaten alive =

Being eaten alive may refer to the act of being consumed while still living, or more colloquially to the act of overwhelming someone.

Eaten alive may also refer to:

== Film ==
- Eaten Alive, a 1976 American horror film directed by Tobe Hooper
- Eaten Alive!, a 1980 Italian horror film directed by Umberto Lenzi
- Eaten Alive (TV program), a 2014 American television nature documentary

== Food ==
- San-nakji, Korean octopus dish sometimes eaten live
- Drunken shrimp, Chinese shrimp dish sometimes eaten live
- Ikizukuri, live sashimi
- Odori ebi, Japanese live shrimp dish
- Yin Yang fish, Chinese live fish dish
- Eating live seafood or eating live animals in general

== History ==
- Damnatio ad bestias, the Roman practice of execution by wild animals such as lions
- Scaphism, an alleged ancient Persian execution method where a victim would be eaten alive by insects

== Music ==
- Eaten Alive (album), a 1985 album by American singer Diana Ross
- "Eaten Alive" (song), the title track off of Diana Ross' album
- Eaten Alive Tour, a series of performances by Diana Ross in support of the album of the same name
- The Eaten Alive Demos, a collection of demos for the Ross album by British-American musician Barry Gibb
