= Eating live animals =

Practice of eating animals that are still alive

- Youtube video of the preparation and eating of sannakji

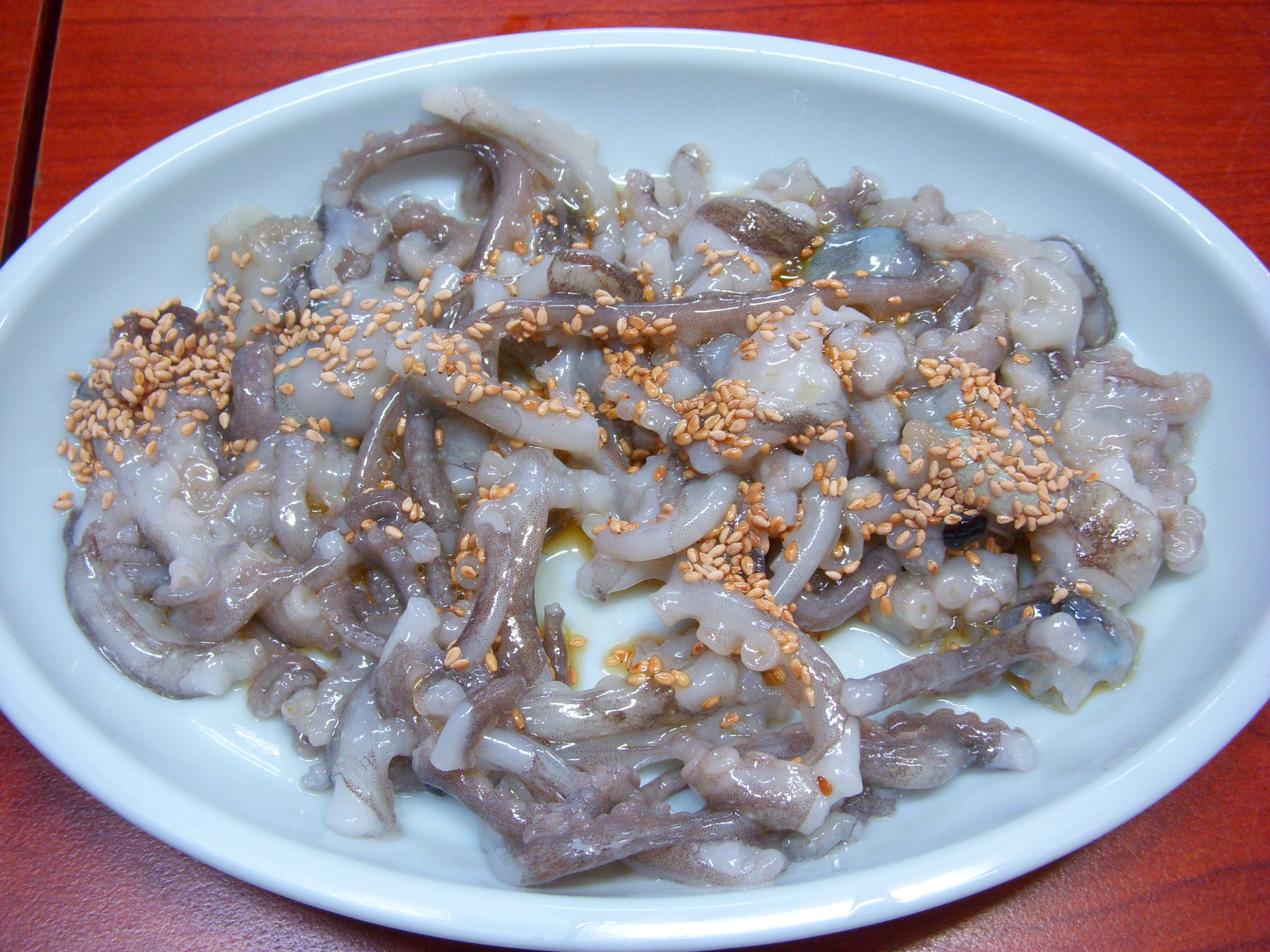
Live octopus that has been cut into small pieces and served (san-nakji), a popular delicacy in South Korea

Eating live animals is the practice of humans or other sentient species eating animals that are still alive. It is a traditional practice in many East Asian food cultures. Animals may also be eaten alive for shock value. Eating live animals, or parts of live animals, may be unlawful in certain jurisdictions under animal cruelty laws. A prohibition of the eating of live animals is one of the Noahide laws of Judaism.

== Practice ==
=== For shock value ===
Several television game shows such as Fear Factor, Survivor and I'm a Celebrity feature segments where contestants must eat live animals including spiders, cockroaches and grubs. On his show Man vs. Wild, host Bear Grylls is sometimes shown eating various insects alive. There have been calls to ban eating animals alive on these shows. A YouTube channel called "Food for Louis" shows Louis Cole eating live animals.

The swallowing of live goldfish was sometimes practiced within the United States.

=== Traditional food ===
==== Fish ====
In Japan, Ikizukuri ("prepared alive") is the preparation of sashimi ("pierced food") made from live seafood. The most popular sea animal used in ikizukuri is fish but octopus is typically the only species that is still moving on the plate.

Another fish dish invented by a Taiwanese chef from Chiayi, is called Yin Yang fish (also dead-and-alive fish) in which the fish's body (but not the head) is rapidly deep-fried and served while the head is still fresh and moving. It is prepared extremely quickly, with care not to damage the internal organs, so that the fish can remain alive for thirty minutes.

In an interview, celebrity chef Raymond Blanc stated that in Japan, he had eaten live eels. He was advised to add vinegar and sake, which made them jump around, and then swallowed them whole.

==== Frog ====
In 2007, a newspaper reported that a man from southeast China claimed that eating live frogs for a month cured his intestinal problems. He also eats live mice and rats.

In 2012, a video showing a woman in Japan eating a live frog was posted on YouTube and went viral. In the video, a live frog is seen stabbed alive, stripped of its skin, and its inedible innards removed to be served as fresh sashimi on an iced platter.

Andrew Zimmern of the Travel Channel's Bizarre Foods ate frog sashimi in a seafood restaurant called Asadachi in Shinjuku. Though most of the frog is served dead (and raw), the meal begins by eating the frog's fresh, still-beating heart.

==== Snake ====
Consuming the beating heart and blood of live snakes has been a reported practice among some locals and tourists in certain parts of Vietnam, particularly Le Mat village in Hanoi. The practice was documented on Gordon's Great Escape when celebrity chef Gordon Ramsay swallowed the beating heart of a cobra at a Ho Chi Minh eatery. It was also consumed by celebrity chef Anthony Bourdain in the same city. But these are considered adventurous foods according to the Vietnamese standard.

==== Octopus ====
In Korea, san-nakji is the preparation of live octopus that has been cut into small pieces or prepared whole, and served with its arms still squirming. The octopus from which the tentacles are cut is usually dead by the time of serving; however, the animal's highly innervated limbs continue to writhe due to continuing nerve activity.

==== Sea urchin ====
Sea urchins are prized as a delicacy in many places worldwide (particularly in Japan, France, South Korea, Chile, New Zealand, the Philippines, Italy, Spain, the Mediterranean, and North America) for their briny-flavoured gonads. The gonads are often eaten raw, such as in sushi (typically called uni). Some people prefer to eat them immediately after they are cut open. Scissors are often used to avoid the protective spines whilst cutting the animal open. The gonads do not move, even when taken from the live animal.

==== Shrimp ====
In China, drunken shrimp is a dish that can be served live, although it can also be prepared with dead shrimp. When served live, the shrimp, usually 10 per serving, are first doused in a strong liquor which makes them less likely to struggle while being swallowed and also creates a flavourful marinade. A plate is typically held over the bowl to prevent the shrimp from leaping out as they are much more active than when served as Odori ebi.

Odori ebi ("dancing shrimp") is a type of Japanese sashimi that contains young shrimp, usually only one individual per serving. The shrimp has its shell removed and sometimes its head as well. These can be deep fried and served alongside the rest of the shrimp, which is still moving its legs and antennae while being eaten. The shrimp dies only when chewed.

==== Oyster ====
Oysters are the most common animal eaten alive, as it is generally their state when served raw.

==== Ant ====
A chain of restaurants, based primarily in Copenhagen, serves a salad crawling with live ants. The ants are chilled so that they move slowly, and are supposed to taste like lemongrass.

==== Cockroach ====
Live cockroaches were eaten in a competition in Florida in 2012. One participant collapsed and died from asphyxia due to choking and aspiration of gastric contents.

==== Mites ====
Cheese mites are mites (for instance Tyrophagus casei or other species) that are used to produce such cheeses as Milbenkäse, Cantal and Mimolette. The action of the living mites on the surface of these cheeses contributes to the flavor and gives them a distinctive appearance.

==== Larva ====
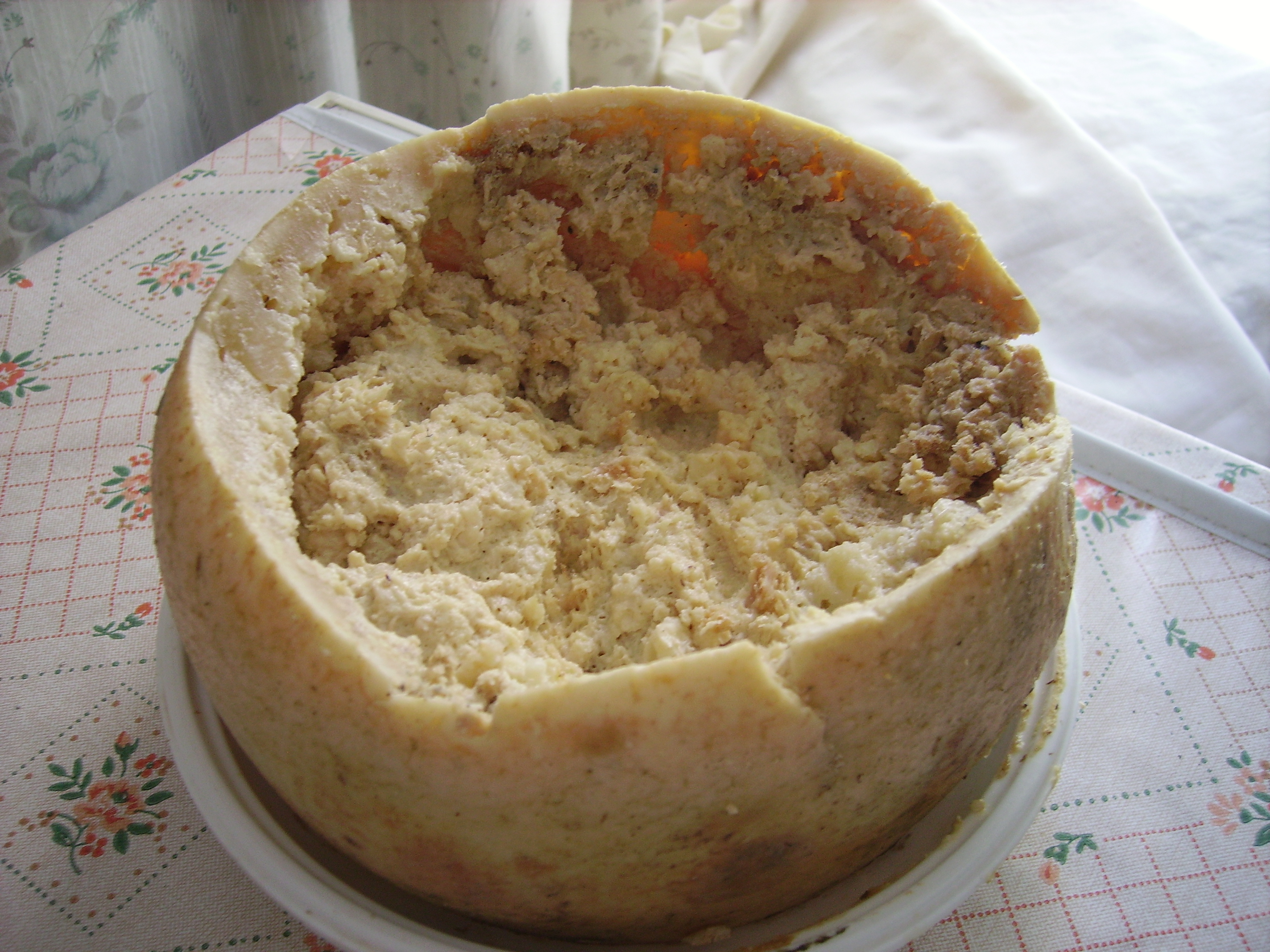
Casu marzu, a traditional Sardinian sheep milk cheese that contains insect larvae

One example of eating live larvae is the witchetty grub of Aboriginal Australian cuisine, which can be eaten alive and raw or cooked.

Casu marzu is a traditional Sardinian sheep milk cheese, notable for containing live insect larvae. It is found almost exclusively in Sardinia, Italy. Casu marzu goes beyond typical fermentation to a stage most would consider decomposition, brought about by the digestive action of the larvae of the cheese fly Piophila casei. These larvae are deliberately introduced to the cheese. The cheese received attention on Bizarre Foods with Andrew Zimmern. Zimmern described the taste of the cheese as "so ammoniated" that "...it scorches your tongue a bit." The cheese is known to leave an aftertaste for a duration of up to several hours. Similar milk cheeses notable for containing living insect larvae are produced in several Italian regions.

== Religious prohibitions ==
=== Judaism ===
According to the Talmud, the sixth Noahide Law (Hebrew: שבע מצוות בני נח, romanized: Sheva mitzvot B'nei Noach, lit. 'Seven Laws [of the] Children [of] Noah') sets out a moral and religious imperative not to eat of a live animal. The Tosefta contains more explicit language on the subject, stating not to eat "a limb torn from a living animal". However, Jewish law also states that this prohibition applies only to the meat of mammals and birds, and not to fish and insects.

As a Noahide Law, this law is said to apply to all the "children of Noah"—that is, all of humanity—as a requirement to ensure a place in the World to Come (Olam Ha-Ba). The laws of Kashrut, on the other hand, set out additional regulations which are binding upon Jews only.

== See also ==
- Eating live seafood
- Odorigui, Japanese term for consumption of live seafood while it is still moving
- Pain in animals
- Pain in invertebrates
- Goldfish swallowing, a school fad in 1930s American high schools and colleges
- Cruelty to animals
