= Dojō nabe =

Japanese hot pot dish

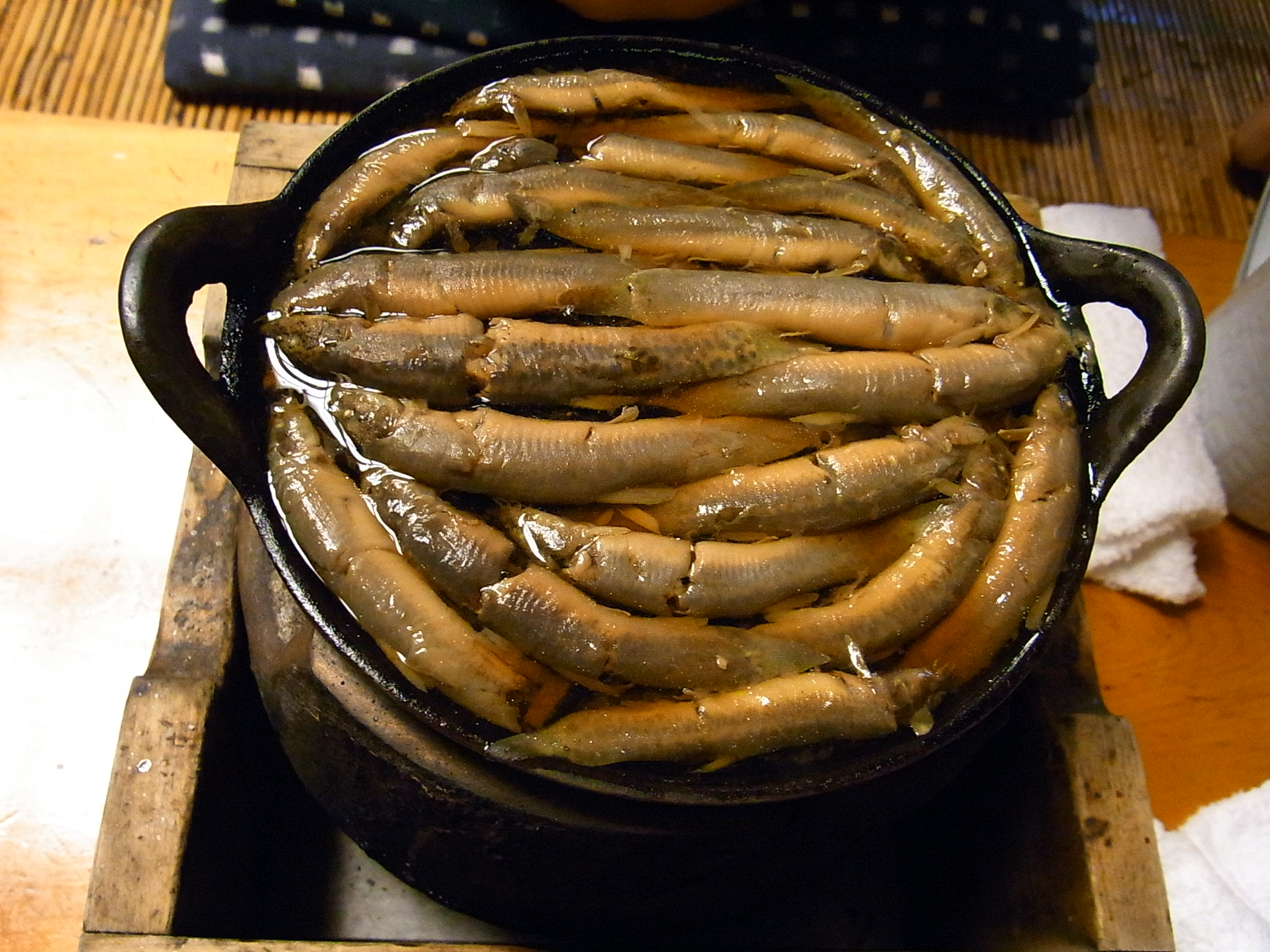
Dojō nabe

Dojo nabe (Japanese: 泥鰌鍋 or ドジョウ鍋; dojō nabe) is a Japanese nabemono dish. To prepare the dish, pond loaches are cooked in a hot pot. The freshwater fishes are either killed ahead of cooking or are first soaked in cold sake and then cooked alive.

== See also ==
- Odorigui, general term for dishes of moving, live seafood
- Ikizukuri, the preparation of sashimi from living animals
- Odori ebi, shrimp eaten alive in Japanese cuisine
- Drunken shrimp, shrimp eaten alive in Chinese cuisine
- Yin Yang fish, partially deep-fried fish eaten alive in Taiwanese cuisine
- Chueo-tang, Korean pond loach soup
- Sannakji, Korean live octopus dish
