= Paragonimiasis =

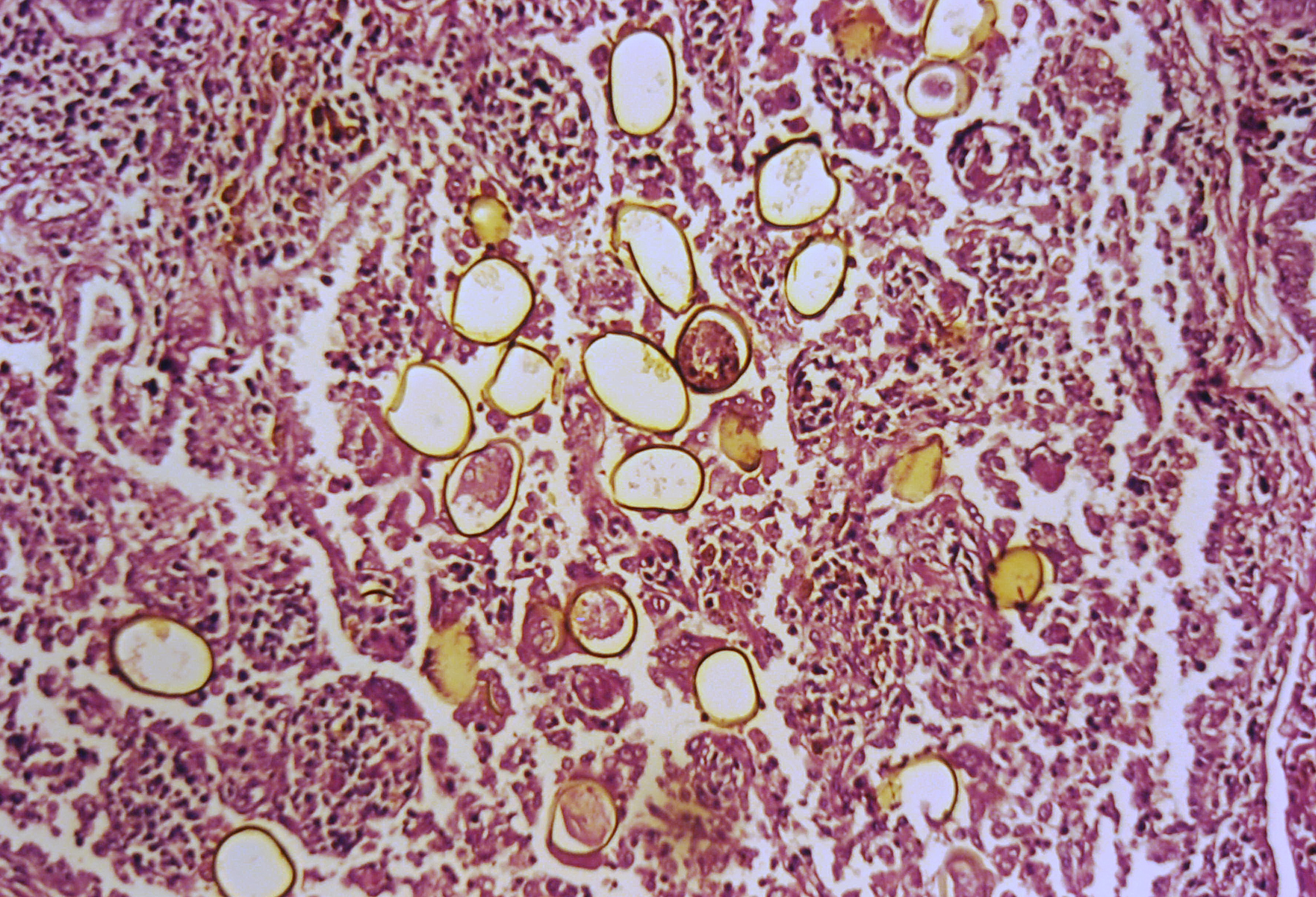
- Photomicrograph showing ova within lung parenchyma
- Specialty: Infectious diseases, helminthology
- Symptoms: Fever, malaise, cough, chest pain
- Complications: Seizures
- Duration: months or years
- Causes: Paragonimus flatworms
- Risk factors: Eating undercooked crabs and crawfish
- Diagnostic method: Blood test, CT scan, serologic test
- Differential diagnosis: Tuberculosis
- Prevention: Eating thoroughly cooked crustaceans
- Medication: Praziquantel, Triclabendazole
- Frequency: 23 million

Paragonimiasis is a food-borne parasitic disease caused by several species of lung flukes belonging to genus Paragonimus. Infection is acquired by eating crustaceans such as crabs and crayfishes which host the infective forms called metacercariae, or by eating raw or undercooked meat of mammals harboring the metacercariae from crustaceans.

More than 40 species of Paragonimus have been identified; 10 of these are known to cause disease in humans. The most common cause of human paragonimiasis is P. westermani, the oriental lung fluke.

About 22 million people are estimated to be affected yearly worldwide. It is particularly common in East Asia. Paragonimiasis is easily mistaken for other diseases with which it shares clinical symptoms, such as tuberculosis and lung cancer.

== Background ==
The first known human case was seen in 1879 in Taiwan. An autopsy was done, and adult trematodes were found in the lungs. The adult flukes are reddish-brown in color with an ovoid shape. They have two muscular suckers, the first an oral sucker located anteriorly and the second a ventral sucker located mid-body. The adult flukes can live up to 20 years. The eggs are golden brown and are asymmetrically ovoid. They have a very thick shell.

These trematodes have a complex life cycle with seven distinct phases involving intermediate hosts and humans. These seven phases are outlined as follows: eggs reach fresh water, where they develop into miracidia. These penetrate many species of aquatic snails (first intermediate host), where they go through three distinct stages: first sporocysts, then rediae, and finally cercariae, also referred to as larvae. These larvae are released into water and penetrate crabs, crayfish, and other crustaceans (second intermediate host). The cercariae situate themselves in the gills, liver, and muscles, where they further develop into metacercariae. When the parasite-filled crustacean is eaten, the metacercariae hatch in the intestine. These young worms penetrate the intestinal wall, peritoneum, the diaphragm, and the pleura, where they finally reach the lungs. Here they live in pairs and lay eggs that are coughed up in sputum to restart the cycle.

== Life cycle ==
Not all Paragonimus species infect humans. However, all of them target mammals as their final (definitive) hosts. In mammalian lung tissue, the adult flukes live as encapsulated pairs. As hermaphrodites, they produce and fertilise their own eggs that are released through the respiratory tract. The eggs are excreted into the environment either through the sputum or by being swallowed and passed out along with the faeces.

In the external environment, the eggs remain unembryonated until ideal conditions of temperature and humidity are encountered. Then, they embryonate and develop into ciliated larvae called miracidia. As the egg shells disintegrate, the motile miracidia hatch and swim to seek the first intermediate host, a snail, and penetrate its soft tissues. Each miracidium goes through several developmental stages inside the snail: firstly into a series of daughter cells called sporocysts and then into rediae, which give rise to many worm-like larvae called cercariae. The cercariae penetrate through the body of the snail, emerging into the water. Development in the snail takes about 9 to 13 weeks.

The cercariae then infect the second intermediate host, a crustacean such as a crab or crayfish, where they encyst and become metacercariae. Encystment occurs in the liver, gills, intestine, skeletal muscles, and sometimes in the heart. These cysts are the infective stage for the mammalian host. Freshwater crab species of the genera Potamiscus, Potamon, Paratelphusa, Eriocheir, Geothelphusa, Barytelphusa, crayfish species of genus Camberoides, and shrimps of the genera Acrohrachium and Caridina commonly serve as the secondary intermediate hosts. The secondary intermediate hosts are infected either by directly eating the snail or penetration of the body by free-swimming cercariae.

Human infection with P. westermani—the best understood species—occurs by eating inadequately cooked or pickled crab or crayfish that harbour metacercariae of the parasite. The metacercariae excyst in the duodenum, penetrate through the intestinal wall into the peritoneal cavity, then through the abdominal wall and diaphragm into the lungs, where they become encapsulated and develop into adults (7.5 to 12 mm by 4 to 6 mm). Unlike most other trematodes, after they migrate from the intestine, they remain in the peritoneal cavity until they find a suitable partner. Only then do the couples enter the lung tissues to form capsules. The flukes can also reach other organs and tissues, such as the brain and skeletal muscles. However, when this takes place, completion of the life cycles is not achieved because the eggs laid cannot exit these sites. Time from infection to laying of eggs is 65 to 90 days. Infections may persist for 20 years in humans. Animals such as pigs, dogs, and a variety of feline species can also harbor P. westermani. For other species, rodents and deer are also additional (paratenic) hosts. By consuming infected animals of these reservoir species, even animals and humans that do not eat crustaceans directly can become infected.

== Geographic distribution ==
There are more than 30 known species of Paragonimus. Species of Paragonimus are widely distributed in Asia, Africa, and North and South America. P. westermani is found in southeast Asia and Japan, while P. kellicotti is endemic to North America. P. africanus is found in Africa and P. mexicanus is found in central and South America. Just as the species names imply, paragonimiasis is more prominent in Asians, Africans and Hispanics because of their habitats and cultures. Prominence increases with age from older children to young adults then decreases with age. It is also higher among the female population. This is a very common parasite of crustacean-eating mammals.

== Symptoms and diagnosis ==
Paragonimiasis causes pneumonia with characteristic symptoms including prolonged cough, chest pain, shortness of breath, and hemoptysis. Owing to the diverse symptoms it presents, the disease is variously known as endemic haemoptysis, oriental lung fluke infection, pulmonary distomiasis, parasitical haemoptysis, and parasitare haemopte. Pulmonary paragonimiasis is the most common clinical manifestation, accounting for 76–90% of all infections. It has the classic symptoms of pneumonia. Extra-pulmonary infection is due to migration of the young worms away from the normal route to the lungs. In such a case, any other part of the body can be infected. Cutaneous paragonimiasis is common in children and is generally indicated by skin nodules that move from one place to another. Cerebral paragonimiasis is the most severe extra-pulmonary symptoms that affect the brain and leads to seizure, headache, visual disturbance, and motor and sensory disturbances.

The acute phase (invasion and migration) may be marked by diarrhea, abdominal pain, fever, cough, urticaria, hepatosplenomegaly, pulmonary abnormalities, and eosinophilia. During the chronic phase, pulmonary manifestations include cough, expectoration of discolored sputum containing clumps of eggs, hemoptysis, and chest radiographic abnormalities. Extrapulmonary locations of the adult worms result in more severe manifestations, especially when the brain is involved. Diagnosis is based on microscopic demonstration of eggs in stool or sputum, but these are not present until 2 to 3 months after infection. (Eggs are also occasionally encountered in effusion fluid or biopsy material.) Concentration techniques may be necessary in patients with light infections. Biopsy may allow diagnostic confirmation and species identification when an adult or developing fluke is recovered.

Diagnosis is made by microscopic examination of sputum and stool samples, and the presence of the eggs confirms the diagnosis. However, eggs are not always found. In such a case, serological tests based on antibody detection using ELISA are a better method. A more arduous method, like immunoblotting, is also used. For brain infection, radiological examinations including plain skull x-rays, brain CT, and MRI scans are used. A rapid antibody detection kit, dot-immunogold filtration assay (DIGFA), was developed for P. wertermani in China in 2005.

Misdiagnosis is a serious issue in paragonimiasis. It is commonly misdiagnosed as tuberculosis because it presents similar symptoms. In China, 69–89% of cases from 2009 to 2019 were misdiagnosed. It is also frequently misidentified as malignancy or chronic obstructive pulmonary disease.

== Treatment ==
The drug of choice to treat paragonimiasis is praziquantel, although bithionol may also be used. Triclabendazole is useful in P. uterobilateralis, P. mexicanus, and P. skrjabini infections but not in P. westermani infection.

== See also ==
- Drunken shrimp
- Eating live seafood
- Odori ebi
