= Katsu ika odori-don =

Japanese squid dish

Katsu ika odori-don (活いか踊り丼, dancing squid rice bowl) is a Japanese dish consisting of a fresh squid atop either rice or noodles. Upon pouring soy sauce on the squid, it squirms ("dances") as the muscles react to the sodium in the sauce, in a similar manner to how frog legs twitch when being seasoned. The dish is commonly served with salmon eggs and other toppings.

== Preparation and serving ==
Noodles or rice are cooked and placed in a bowl and topped with salmon eggs and other ingredients. Next, a live squid's head is removed, and its body placed on top of the dish. When served, the squid appears lifeless until soy sauce, or any other sodium-rich liquid, is applied. The sodium activates muscles which make the squid's arms wriggle momentarily. Occasionally, the movement is enough to escape the bowl. Afterward, the body is removed, sliced and placed on top of the dish.

== Origin ==
The dish, based on the traditional Japanese dish "ika-don", was renamed to "odori-don" when the sushi restaurant Ikkatei Tabiji in Japan's Hokkaido Prefecture began serving the squid whole, as opposed to slicing it as was previous prepared.

== "Dancing" ==
Although the squid seems to be momentarily alive, the phenomenon is a result of adding soy sauce, which contains sodium chloride. An increased concentration of sodium ions cause neurons adjacent to muscles in the tentacles to fire (see action potential). Stimulation of the muscles by neurons causes an increase in the calcium concentration in muscle cells which, together with adenosine triphosphate (ATP) left in the cells posthumously, results in muscle contraction that make it seem like the squid is "dancing".

== See also ==
- Sannakji
- Odorigui
