= Odori ebi =

Japanese sushi dish with live shrimp

- Place of origin: Japan
- Associated cuisine: Japanese
- Main ingredients: Shrimps
- Ingredients generally used: Sake
- Similar dishes: Drunken shrimp

Odori ebi (踊り海老/躍り海老, "dancing shrimp") is a sushi delicacy of Japan, and a form of sashimi. The sushi contains baby shrimp that are still alive and able to move their legs and antennae while being eaten. The meal is prepared quickly to keep the shrimp alive, and when it is eaten the shrimp are usually dunked into sake so as to intoxicate the shrimp, then into a special dipping sauce, and finally quickly chewed to kill it. The shrimp can be served either whole or shelled with the head removed; the head and shell are sometimes quickly deep fried and served on the side.

A similar salad dish is served in Thailand, under the name yum goong ten ("dancing shrimp").

Consuming uncooked shellfish may be a serious health hazard due to the risk of paragonimiasis.

== Preparation ==
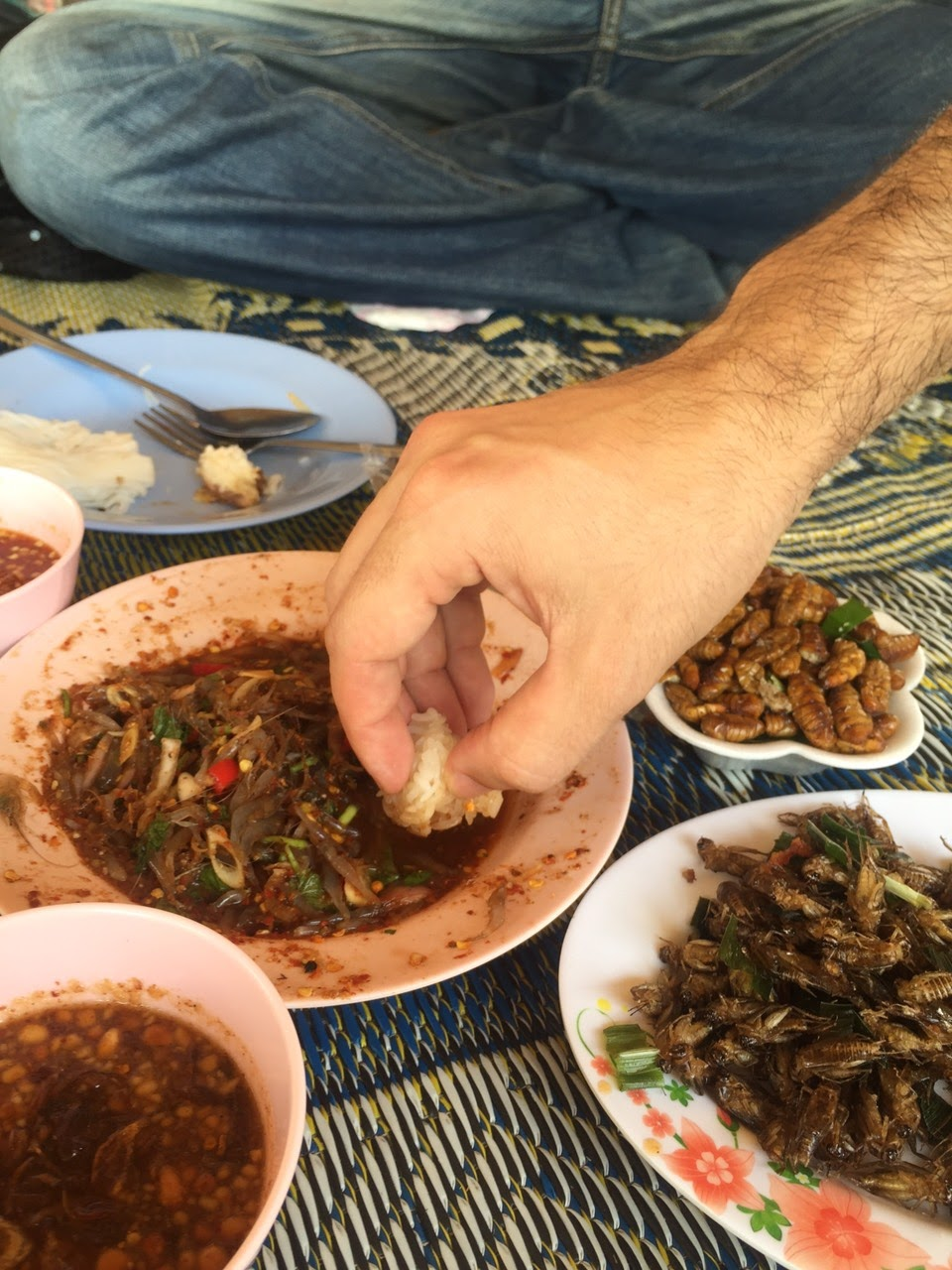
Goong ten in Thailand

To make odori ebi, prawns are taken from their aquarium and dipped in sake as an anesthetic. They are then quickly cleaned and cut so that they are still moving when served (hence the "dancing"). Sometimes, the head and shell are removed and deep-fried as a side dish. The dish is usually made with Kuruma prawns (Marsupenaeus japonicus), which are said to be in prime condition when their flesh is grey, the tail is bluish, and there is no fishy odor.

A similar Thai dish, yum goong ten, is a salad with live freshwater shrimp. The salad is made with chilies, onion, fish sauce, lemon juice, and cilantro. Once the shrimp are added on, the sauces cause them to move, or "dance". Often, a lid is placed on top of the salad to keep the shrimp from escaping.

In 2015, the Danish restaurant Noma served a "live" prawn dish covered in ants. The prawn were, in fact, killed with a spike shortly before being served, but were so recently dead that their muscles and antennae still twitched, giving the impression that they were alive.

== History ==
Odori ebi originated in the era before World War II, and typically involved Kuruma prawns. As these prawns could be expensive to harvest, Motosaku Fujinaga, an ichthyology student at Tokyo University, began raising captive prawns in 1933. This would be the first time that shrimp were raised in captivity, though Fujinaga did not see commercial success until the 1950s.

== Controversy ==
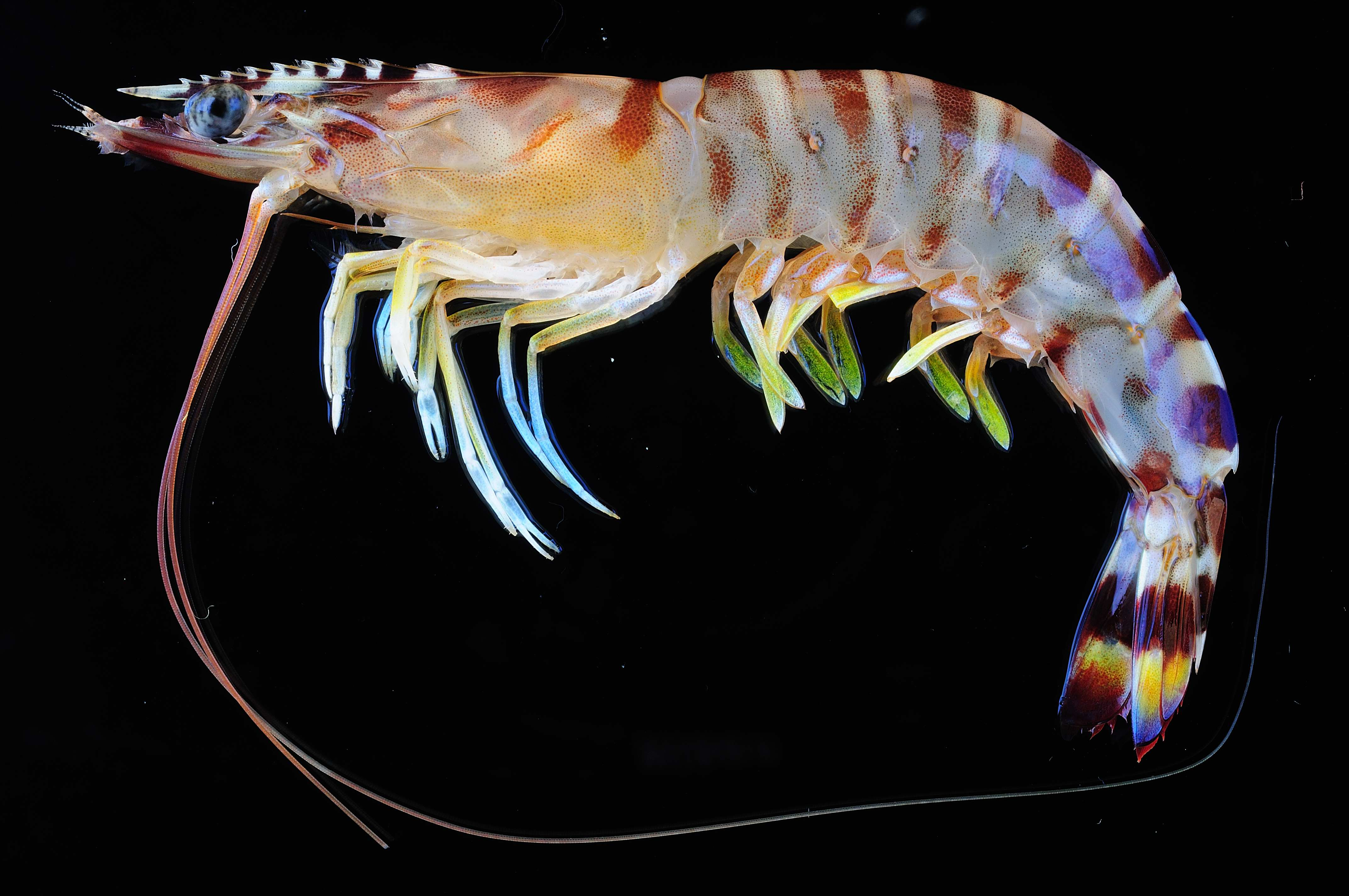
Marsupenaeus japonicus, or kuruma prawn, commonly used in odori ebi

The concept of eating live shrimp is controversial, especially in the west. In 2010, a sushi restaurant in Sacramento, California stopped serving the dish after a successful campaign by People for the Ethical Treatment of Animals, who opposed it based on evidence that shrimp can feel pain. Schifferstein, Lemke and Huisman write that this is a cultural difference, and that the "paradoxial" nature of one person being disgusted by it, and another being unbothered, comes down to how their respective cultures prepare food.

Some Thai Buddhists defend the practice, claiming that the eater becomes a vessel for the shrimp's spirit.

== In popular culture ==
A scene in the 1985 comedy Tampopo uses odori ebi as part of its "precise aesthetic of cruelty", in which a yakuza places the dying shrimp on his lover to sexually stimulate her.

== See also ==
- Drunken shrimp, Chinese equivalent dish
- Odorigui, general term for dishes of moving, live seafood
- Ikizukuri, the preparation of sashimi from living animals
- Dojō nabe, live preparation of pond loaches in a hot pot
- Yin Yang fish, partially deep-fried fish eaten alive in Taiwanese cuisine
- Chueo-tang, Korean pond loach soup
- Sannakji, Korean live octopus dish
