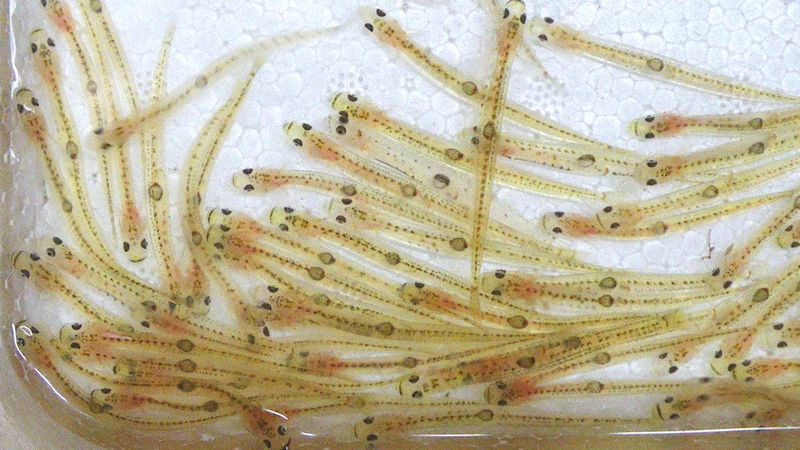

Conservation status
- Least Concern (IUCN 3.1)

Scientific classification
- Kingdom: Animalia
- Phylum: Chordata
- Class: Actinopterygii
- Order: Gobiiformes
- Family: Oxudercidae
- Subfamily: Gobionellinae
- Genus: Leucopsarion; Hilgendorf, 1880
- Species: L. petersii

Binomial name
- Leucopsarion petersii Hilgendorf, 1880

= Ice goby =

Species of fish

The ice goby (Leucopsarion petersii) is a species of goby in the subfamily Gobionellinae, and the only member of the monotypic genus Leucopsarion. It is native to the northwestern Pacific Ocean, where it occurs in China, Japan, and Korea. Its English language common name is ice goby, and in Japanese it is known as shiro-uo. In Japan, where it is a delicacy, it is also called shirouo no odorigui ("dancing icefish").

This goby has a thin, elongated, "eel-like" body up to 13 centimeters (5.1 in) in length. It exhibits neoteny, retaining a larval form even when a sexually mature adult. It lacks scales and has a swim bladder and a small pelvic fin; most gobies develop scales, lose their swim bladders, and grow longer pelvic fins as they mature into adulthood. The body of L. petersii is transparent, and the eggs may be visible through the body wall.

There are two lineages of this species, the Sea of Japan and Pacific Ocean lineages. They are related to the paths of the Kuroshio Current and its Sea of Japan branch, the Tsushima Current. Where they are sympatric, the lineages interbreed. Individuals of the Sea of Japan lineage are generally larger and have more vertebrae.

This goby feeds on marine plankton, including algae, when it lives in the ocean. It is anadromous, entering freshwater habitats such as rivers, where it spawns. It does not feed during this time, and it dies directly afterwards.

The ice goby is a valued food fish in South Korea and Japan, where it commands high prices. It is usually eaten raw, and often alive (see odorigui).

The generic name is a compound noun formed from the Greek leukos meaning "white" in reference to the pale, translucent body and opsarion meaning "fish eaten with bread" and which is equivalent to the Japanese name for this fish Shiri-uwo. The specific name honours Wilhelm C. H. Peters (1815-1883), a German explorer and naturalist, who put Hilgendorf's original description of this species forward for publication.
