= Odorigui =

Consumption of live, moving seafood in Japanese cuisine

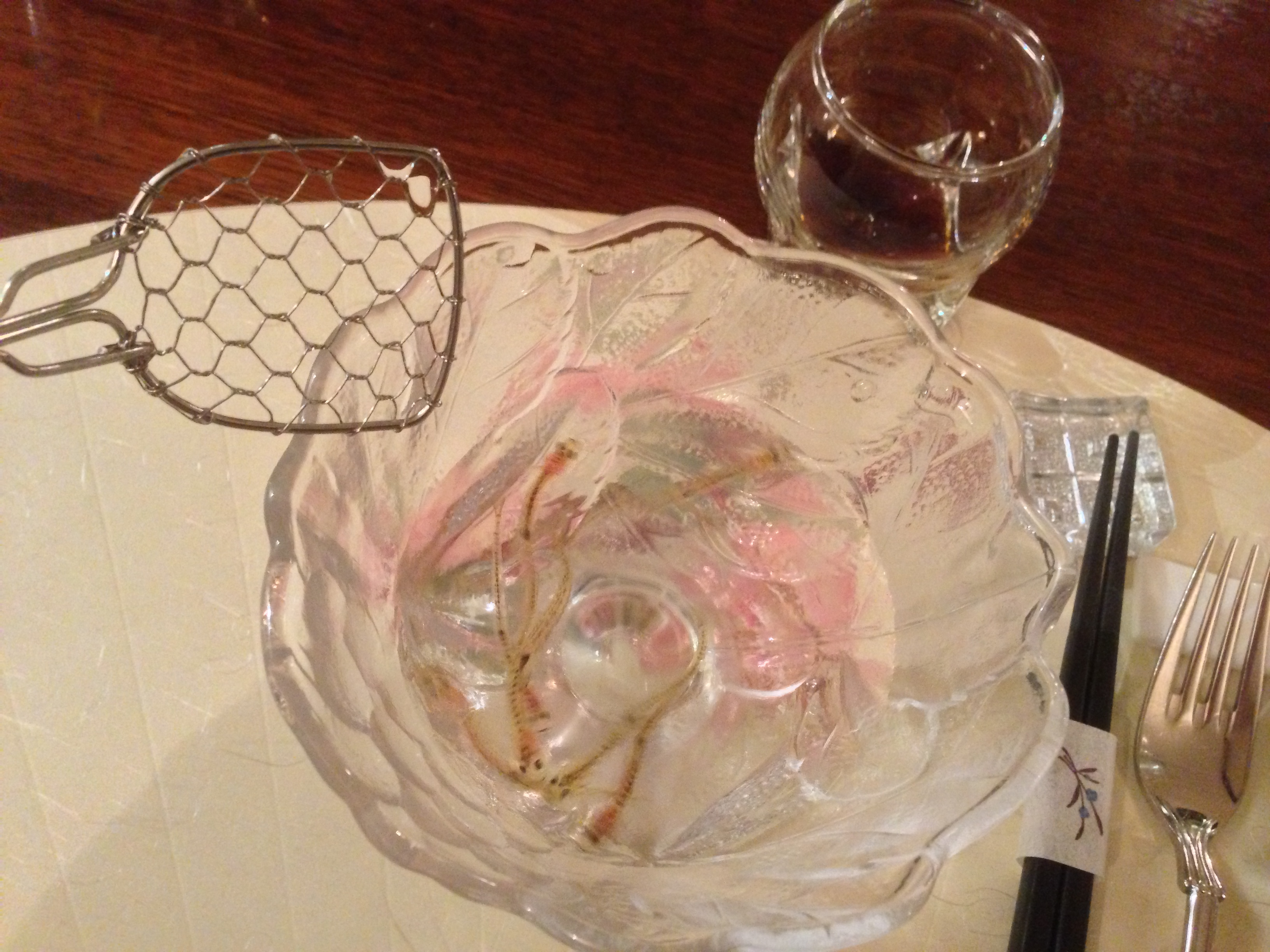
Odorigui of ice gobies in Japan in April 2013

Odorigui (踊り食い, literally "dancing eating") is a mode of seafood consumption in Japanese cuisine.

Odorigui refers to the consumption of live seafood while it is still moving, or the consumption of moving animal parts. Animals usually consumed in odorigui style include octopus, squids, ice gobies, and other similar animals. Consumption of live seafood without remarkable movements, such as sea urchins, is usually not included in odorigui.

== Examples ==
- Katsu ika odori-don (活いか踊り丼) lit. "living squid dancing rice bowl". In this dish, a mostly-complete squid is used, and its muscles twitch and move vigorously when soy sauce is poured over the rice.
- Shirouo-no-odorigui (素魚の踊り食い) goby fish dance while being eaten
- Odori ebi (踊り海老) dancing shrimp

== See also ==
- Ikizukuri, the preparation of sashimi from living animals
- Dojō nabe, live preparation of pond loaches in a hot pot
- Odori ebi, shrimp eaten alive in Japanese cuisine
- Drunken shrimp, shrimp eaten alive in Chinese cuisine
- Yin Yang fish, partially deep-fried fish eaten alive in Taiwanese cuisine
- Chueo-tang, Korean pond loach soup
- Sannakji, Korean live octopus dish
