= Lệ Mật =

Le Mat is a village in Viet Hung Ward, Long Bien District, about 7 km northeast of Hanoi city center (now belonging to Viet Hung Ward, Long Bien District, Hanoi City). The village is famous for its snake catching and specialty snake meat processing. Every year, on March 23 of the lunar calendar, people of the surrounding areas and visitors from everywhere visit Le Mat village.

== Traditional connection to snakes ==
The tradition of snake hunting and snake meat processing in the village is closely linked to the legend of a village tutelary god Phuc Ngoc Trung, from Le Mat village. The story is that: in the 11th century, the daughter of King Ly Than Tong sailed on the Thien Duc River (the Duong River today) and was captured by a snake-shaped monster. Though entourage was not large enough to save her, fortunately, a young fisherman named Hoang rushed into the battle and beheaded the monster. (An alternative version has the princess die, and the fisherman bravely retrieve her corpse). The brave young man refused all fame, gold and silver awarded by the king, merely asking permission to bring the villagers of Thang Long to the land west of Thang Long citadel. After being approved by the king, Le Mat people crossed the Nhi Ha river (Red river) to explore this area. He and the villagers set up 13 prosperous hamlets known as "Thap Tam Trai". Following his example, the people of Le Mat village, in addition to farmers, also develop snakes and snake raising. Currently, there are hundreds of snake households in the village, dozens of snake speciality restaurants and many cultural and artistic activities about snakes held annually. Le Mat is considered as a snake transaction center of the whole North, and a famous snake village in Vietnam and around the world.

== History ==
Le Mat village at the end of the Le dynasty under the Nguyen dynasty was a commune of Gia Thuy canton, Gia Lam district, Thuan An district, Kinh Bac town. In 1961, Viet Hung commune and the communes and towns in Gia Lam district were imported to Hanoi. In 2003, when a part of Gia Lam district was separated to establish Long Bien district, Viet Hung commune was changed to Viet Hung ward of Long Bien district. Le Mat is an ancient village named "Tru Mat", and was likely renamed after Lord Trinh Chu (Trinh Cuong) (1686 - 1729). Le Mat village once had two communal houses: Thuong temple worshipping Trang Trinh Nguyen Binh Khiem and Ha communal house, worshipping hero of Hoang family.

== Le Mat Village Festival ==
Le Mat village festival is an opportunity for every year the children and grandchildren to go to reclaim the land in Thang Long citadel (local people) to meet to confide and express their gratitude to the group. The village festival is held every year from March 20 to 24 of the lunar calendar, the main festival is on the 23rd of the third lunar month, worshiping the Imperial Citadel of Le Mat village. On the main festival, representatives of the descendants of the 13 western camps of Thang Long ancient team of 13 offered gifts from the capital to Le Mat village communal house to attend the festival. In the village festival, there is a unique snake dance, the snake made of bamboo roofing cloth symbolizes the sea monster that was defeated by the young man of Hoang. There are also contests for big and beautiful snakes, strange snakes, etc. to popularize the secrets of capturing snakes, raising snakes, exploiting venom, curing venomous snakes. Visitors attending the festival can enjoy specialities made from snake meat.
