= Shrimp and prawn as food =

Crustaceans used for culinary purposes

Raw shrimp (mixed species)
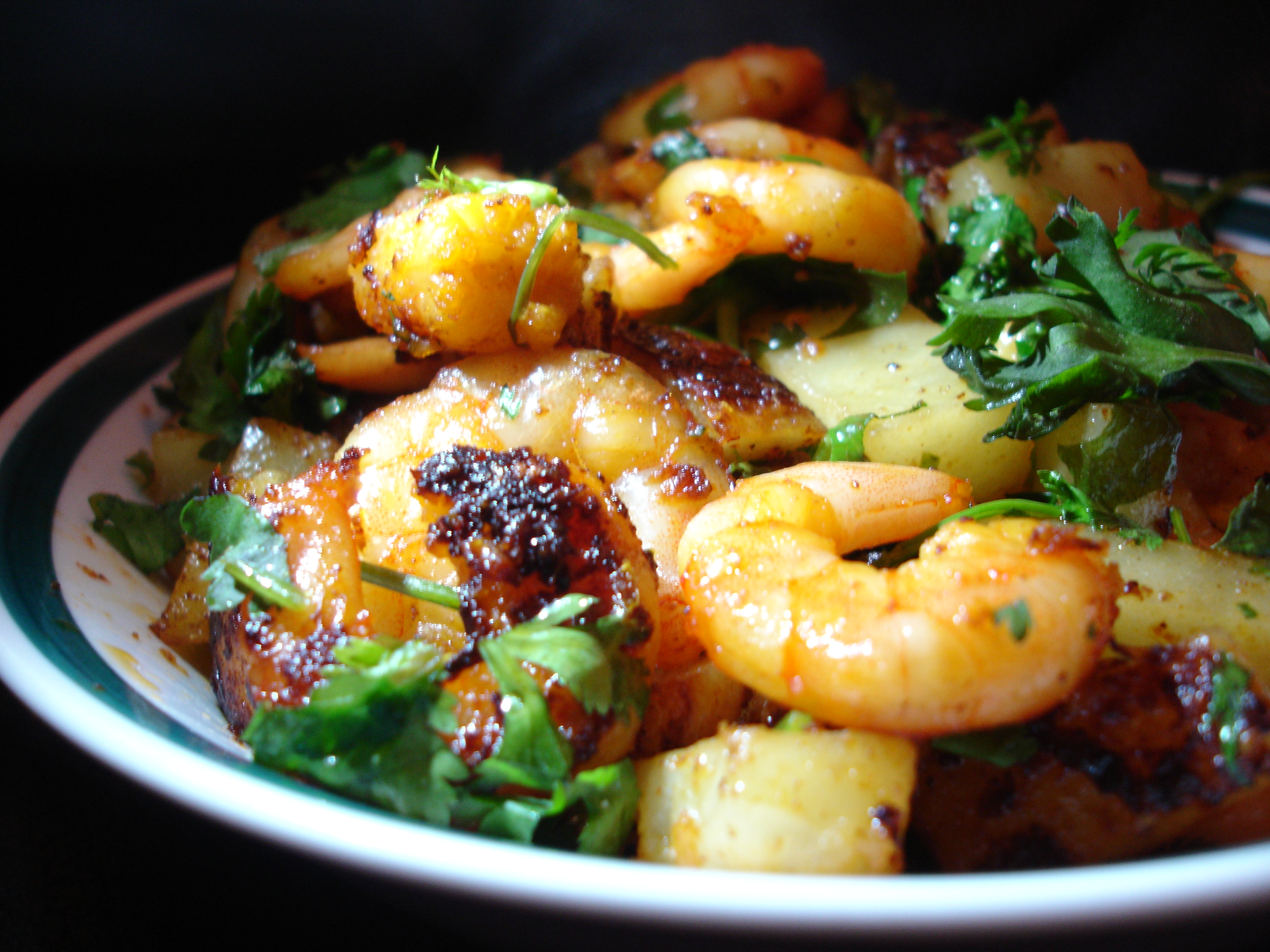
- Awadhi marinated king prawns

Nutritional value per 100 g (3.5 oz)
- Energy: 297 kJ (71 kcal)
- Carbohydrates: 0.91 g
- Fat: 1.01 g
- Saturated: 3.98 g
- Monounsaturated: 0.080 g
- Protein: 13.61 g
Vitamins and minerals
Vitamins	Quantity %DV^{†}
Vitamin A	180 IU
Vitamin D	0% 2 IU
Minerals	Quantity %DV^{†}
Calcium	4% 54 mg
Iron	1% 0.21 mg
Magnesium	5% 22 mg
Phosphorus	20% 244 mg
Potassium	4% 113 mg
Sodium	25% 566 mg
Zinc	9% 0.97 mg
- Other constituents: Quantity
- Water: 83.01 g
- Cholesterol: 0.0013 g
- Link to Full USDA Database Information
- ^{†}Percentages estimated using US recommendations for adults, except for potassium, which is estimated based on expert recommendation from the National Academies.

Shrimps and prawns are types of crustacean seafood that are consumed worldwide. Prawns and shrimps are crustacea and are very similar in appearance with the terms often used interchangeably in commercial farming and wild fisheries. A distinction was made in 1990s Indian aquaculture literature, which increasingly uses the term "prawn" only for the freshwater forms of palaemonids and "shrimp" for the marine penaeids that belong to different suborders of Decapoda. This has not been universally accepted.

In the United Kingdom, the word "prawn" is more common on menus than "shrimp", whereas the opposite is the case in North America. Also, the term "prawn" is loosely used for larger types, especially those that come 30 (or fewer) to the kilogram — such as "king prawns", yet sometimes known as "jumbo shrimp". In Britain, very small crustaceans with a brownish shell are called shrimps, and are used to make the traditional English dish of potted shrimps. Australia and some other Commonwealth nations follow this British usage to an even greater extent, using the word "prawn" almost exclusively. When Australian comedian Paul Hogan used the phrase, "I'll slip an extra shrimp on the barbie for you" in an American television advertisement, it was intended to make what he was saying easier for his American audience to understand, and was thus a deliberate distortion of what an Australian would typically say. The French term crevette is often encountered in restaurants.

All shellfish, including prawns and shrimps, are among the most common food allergens.

The Jewish dietary laws, kashrut forbid the eating of shellfish, including prawns and shrimps. Meanwhile, in Islamic dietary law, the Shafi'i, Maliki, Hanbali and Ja'fari schools allow the eating of shrimp, while the Hanafi school does not.

== Nutrition ==
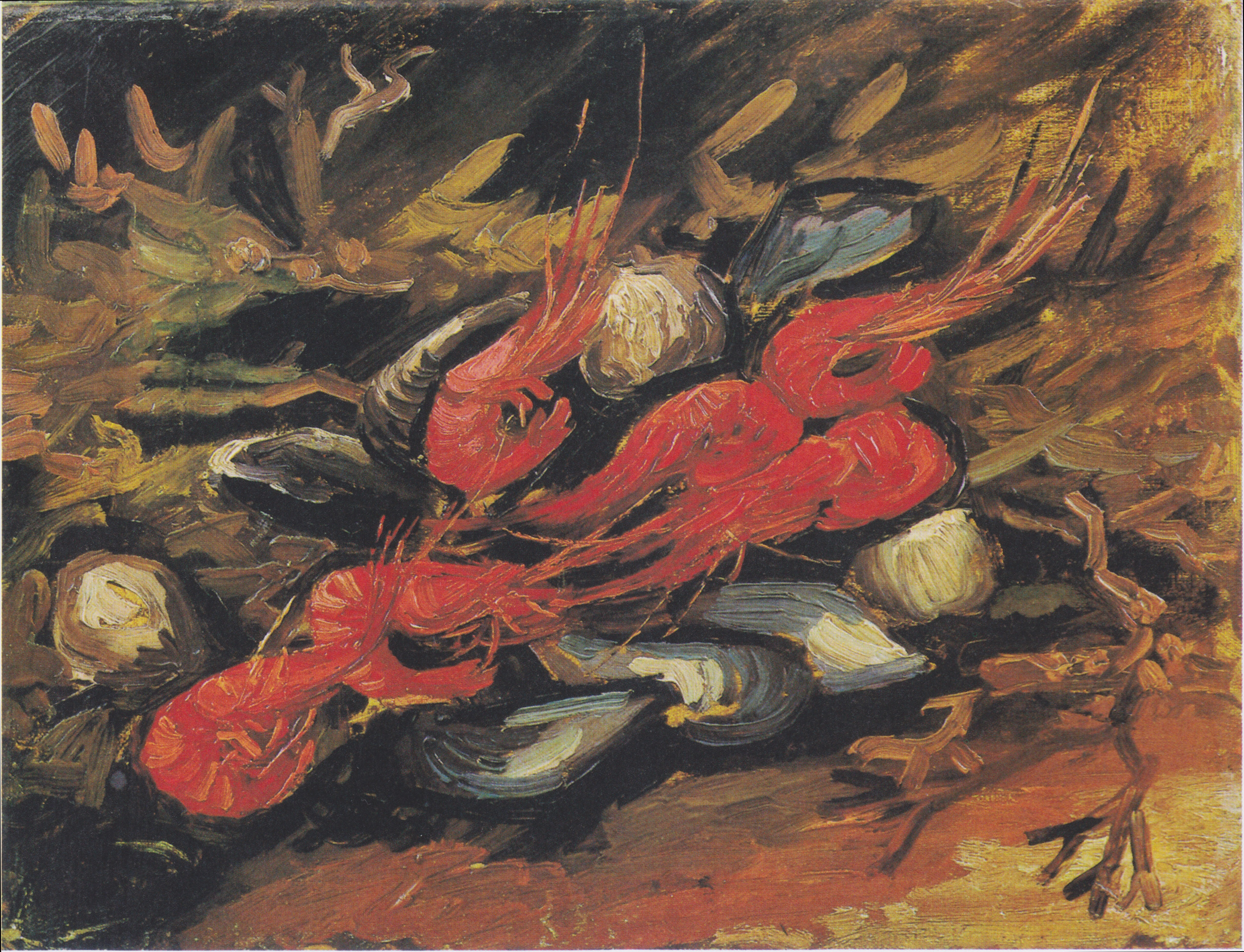
Mussels and shrimps, Vincent van Gogh (1886)

As with other seafood, crustacea are high in protein but low in food energy. A shrimp-based meal is also a significant source of cholesterol, from 122 mg to 251 mg per 100 g of shrimp, depending on the method of preparation. Shrimp consumption, however, is considered healthy for the circulatory system because the lack of significant levels of saturated fat in shrimp means that the high cholesterol content in shrimp actually improves the ratio of LDL to HDL cholesterol and lowers triglycerides.

Prawns are high in levels of omega-3s (generally beneficial) and low in levels of toxic mercury, with an FDA study in 2010 showing a level of 0.001 parts per million analysing only methylmercury.

== Preparation ==
Preparing for consumption the smaller shrimp is done just by shelling, whereas for the larger prawns usually involves removing the head, shell, tail, and "sand vein". A notable exception is drunken shrimp, a dish using freshwater shrimp that is often eaten alive, but immersed in ethanol to make consumption easier.

To shell a prawn, the tail is held while gently removing the shell around the body. The tail can be detached completely at this point, or left attached for presentation purposes. Although the head and shell are generally removed before consumption, they are edible when cooked. Much of the flavor of prawns comes from the shell, so it is preferable to cook them before shelling, otherwise by adding the shells to the cooking stock prior to straining or by flash cooking the shells in the pan to extract the "juices".

There's a million ways to cook shrimp... shrimp is the fruit of the sea. You can barbecue it, boil it, broil it, bake it, saute it. Dey's uh, shrimp-kabobs, shrimp creole, shrimp gumbo. Pan fried, deep fried, stir-fried. There's pineapple shrimp, lemon shrimp, coconut shrimp, pepper shrimp, shrimp soup, shrimp stew, shrimp salad, shrimp and potatoes, shrimp burger, shrimp sandwich...

— American soldier Benjamin Buford "Bubba" Blue, in the 1994 drama-comedy film Forrest Gump

Removing the "sand vein" (a euphemism for the digestive tract) is referred to as "deveining". This can be removed by making a shallow cut lengthwise down the outer curve of the prawn's body, allowing the dark ribbon-like gut to be removed with a pointed utensil. Special deveining tools are sometimes used, but knives, skewers, and even toothpicks can be used to devein. Alternatively, if the tail has been detached, the gut can be pinched at the tail end and pulled out completely with the fingers. On large prawns, the "blood vein" (a euphemism for the ventral nerve cord) along the inner curve of its body is typically removed as well. It is then rinsed under cold running water. Removing these "veins" is not essential, as it is not poisonous and is mostly tasteless. Deveining does slightly change the flavor and makes it more consistent. Shrimp also sometimes consume small amounts of sand and so the vein might be gritty.

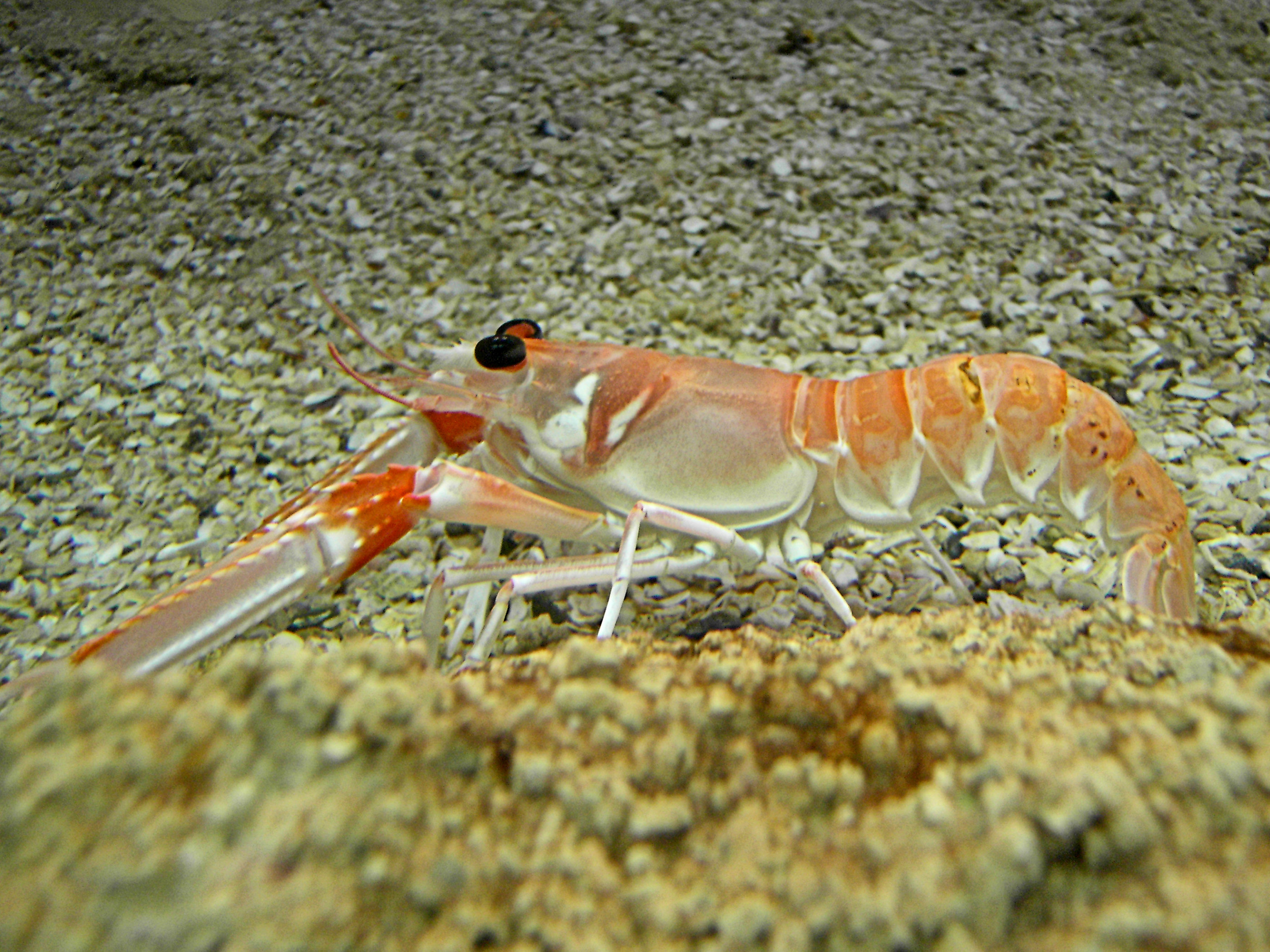
A Norway lobster, Dublin Bay prawn, or langoustine with eggs — the basis of scampi

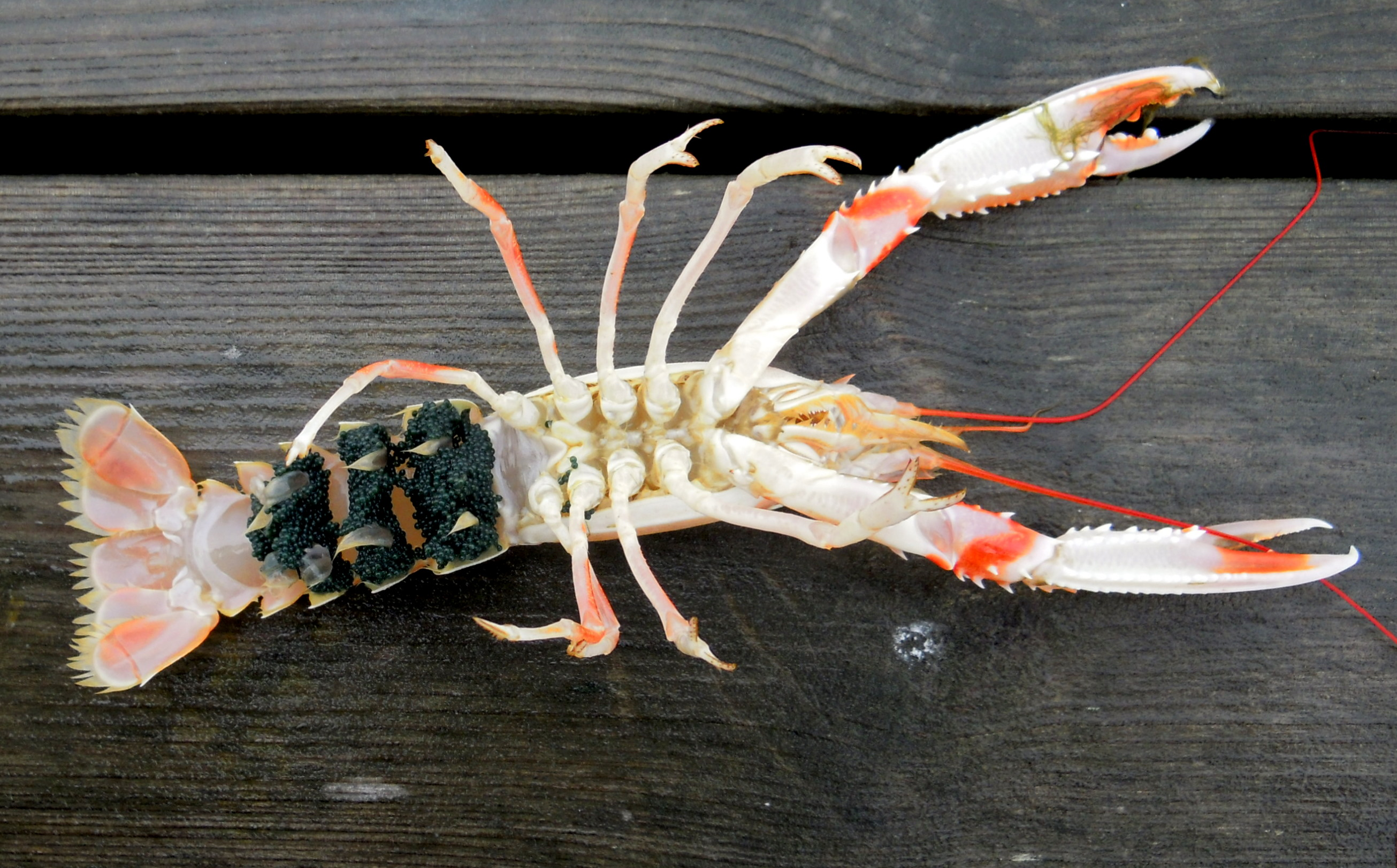
An adult female Norway lobster, Dublin Bay prawn, or langoustine with eggs

Recipes using shrimp form part of the cuisine of many cultures. Strictly speaking, dishes containing scampi should be made from the Norway lobster, also called Dublin Bay prawn or langoustine in French — a crustacean c.10 centimetres (4 inches) long, more closely related to the lobster than shrimp — though in some places it is quite common for other prawns to be used instead.

Shrimp and prawns are versatile ingredients. Common methods of preparation include baking, boiling, frying, grilling, and barbequing. They are as delicate as eggs with regard to cooking time. Either cook them quickly, at a high heat for a very short time or else at a low cooking temperature for a long time, or if mixed into a dish, then added close to the end of cooking. When they are overcooked, they have a tough and rubbery texture.

Wet shrimp is commonly used as a flavoring and as a soup base in many Asian cuisines with shrimp curry being very popular in South Asia and Southeast Asia. Other recipes include bagoong, okonomiyaki, and poon choi. In the subject of Japanese sushi, shrimp has long been valued as the "king of sushi-dane", as its composition can be either raw or cooked, and its latter preparation has often been considered a good introduction or choice for those unfamiliar to eating sushi, especially dishes involving raw fish. In North America, fried shrimp is popular, as is jambalaya in the southern States. Shrimp are also found in Latin American and Caribbean dishes such as enchiladas and coconut shrimp. In Europe, prawns and especially langoustines are very popular, forming a necessary ingredient in Italian cacciucco, Portuguese caldeirada, Spanish paella de marisco, and many other seafood dishes. Prawns are also consumed as salad, by frying, with rice, and as shrimp guvec — a dish baked in a clay pot — on the Mediterranean coast of Turkey.

Also, shrimps are fermented into shrimp paste and prawn sauce condiments in southeast Asia and China.

== Substitutes ==
Several alternatives have emerged, fostered by environmental and welfare concerns regarding the fishing and farming of shrimps. Plant-based alternatives often have soy or seitan as a main ingredient. They may also use konjac for the texture, and various other ingredients like seaweed.

== Marketing ==
Shrimp are marketed and commercialized with several issues in mind. Most shrimp are sold frozen and marketed based on their categorization of presentation, grading, colour and uniformity.

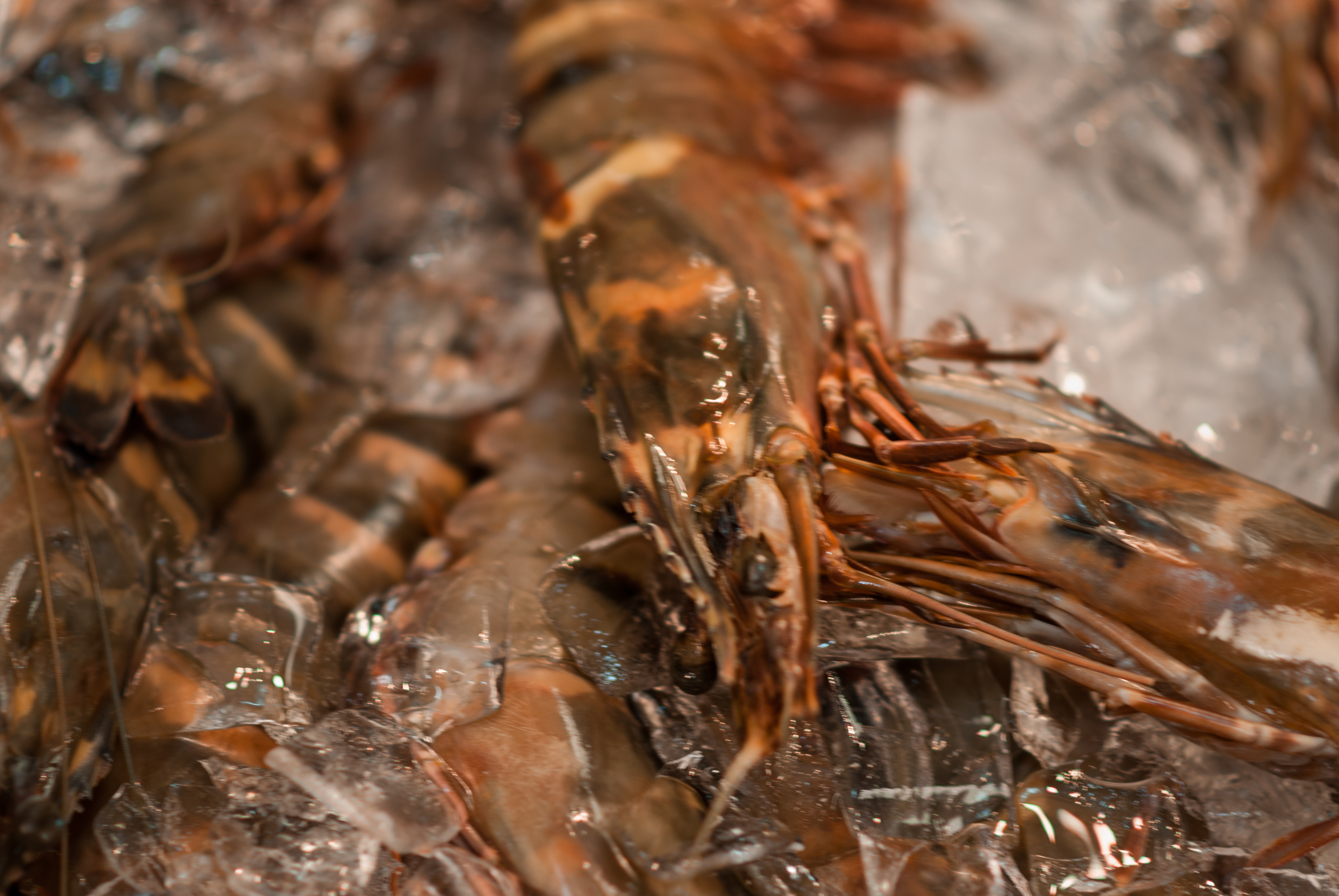
Shrimp chilled with ice in a market

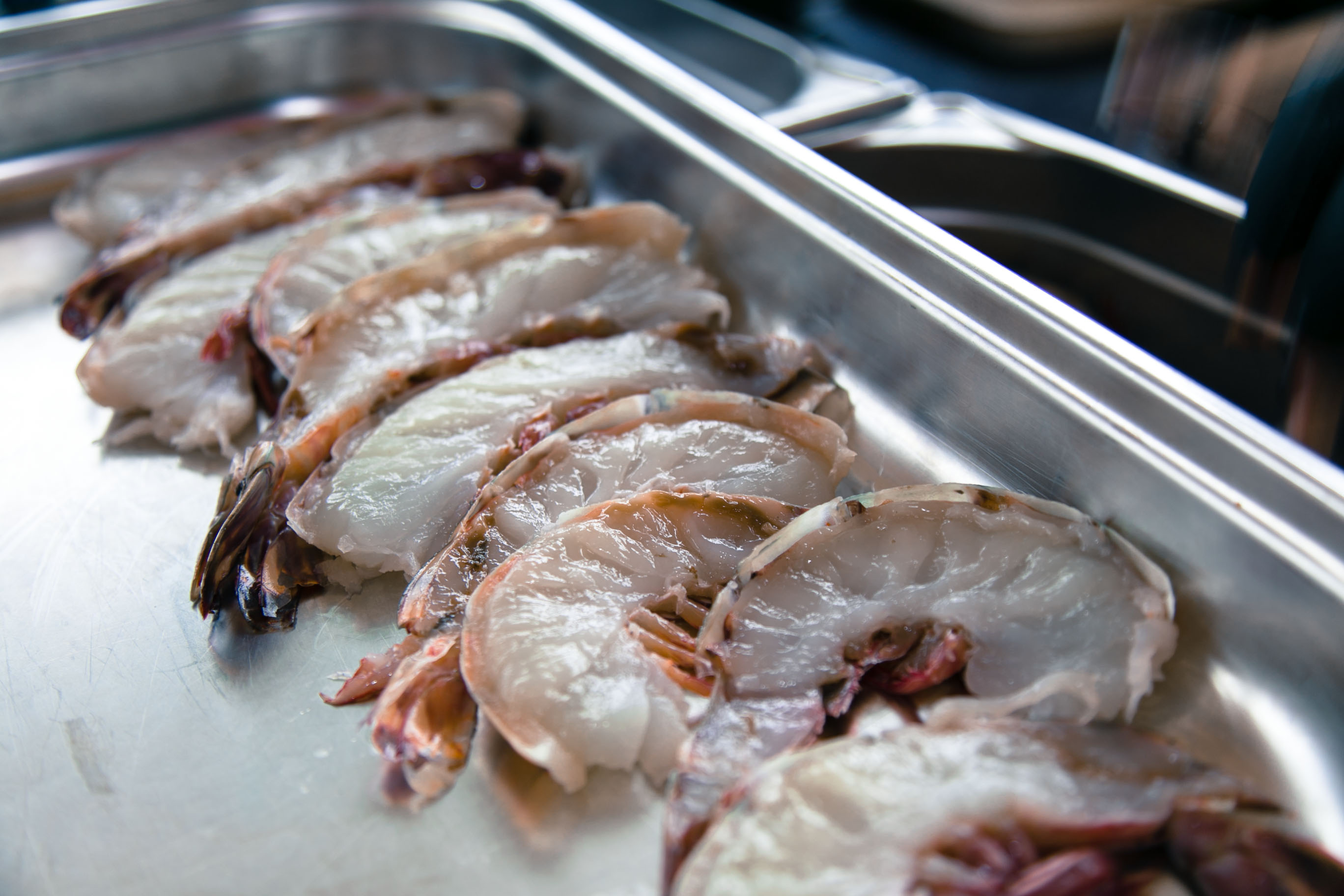
Split raw prawns

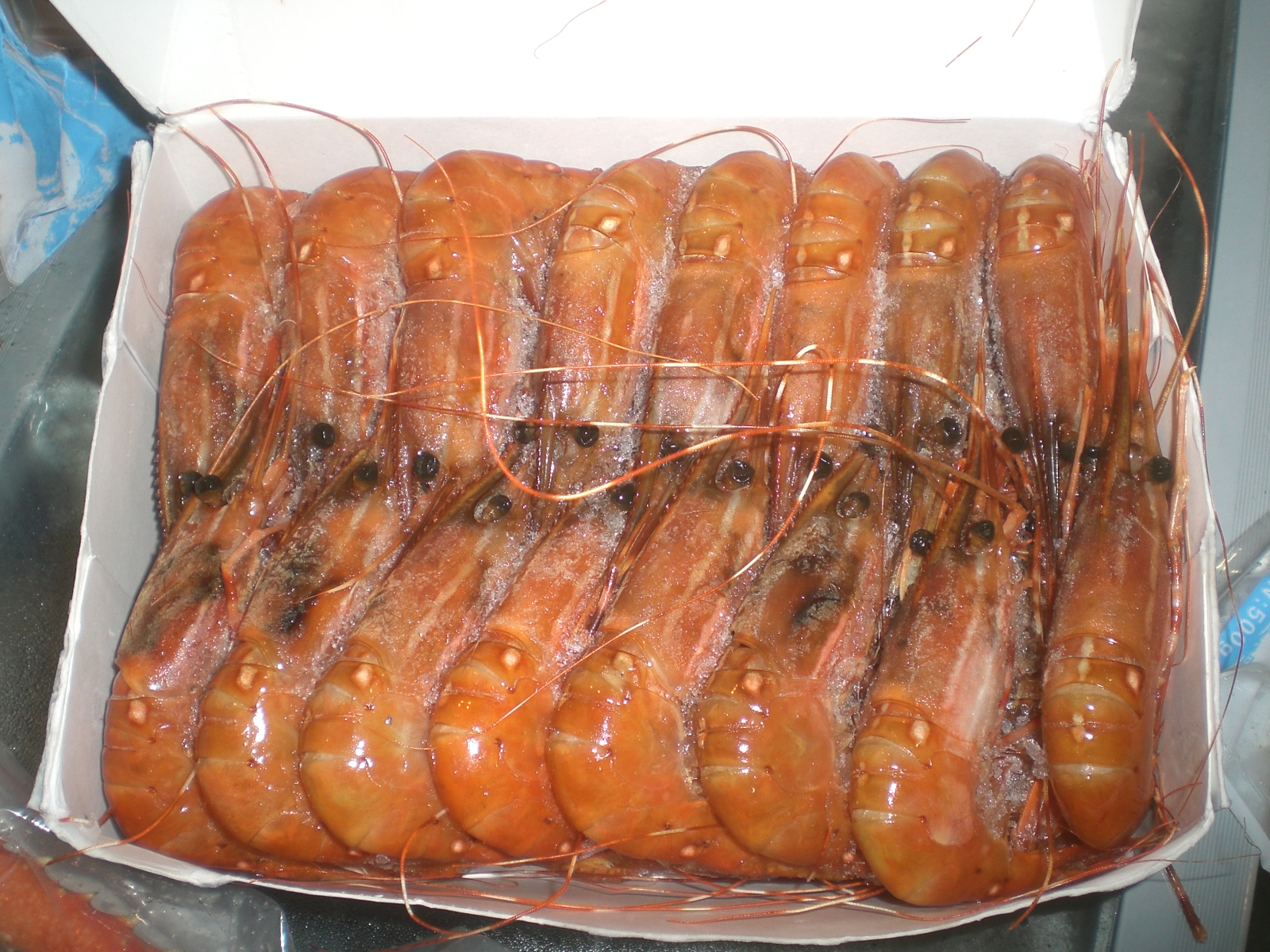
Frozen prawns

== Prawn dishes ==
Many various dishes are prepared using shrimp as a primary ingredient. Ebiko, or shrimp roe, sometimes translated as "shrimp flakes", is used as an ingredient in the preparation of sushi. There also exist popcorn shrimp, garlic butter shrimp, and breaded or battered deep-fried small shrimp.

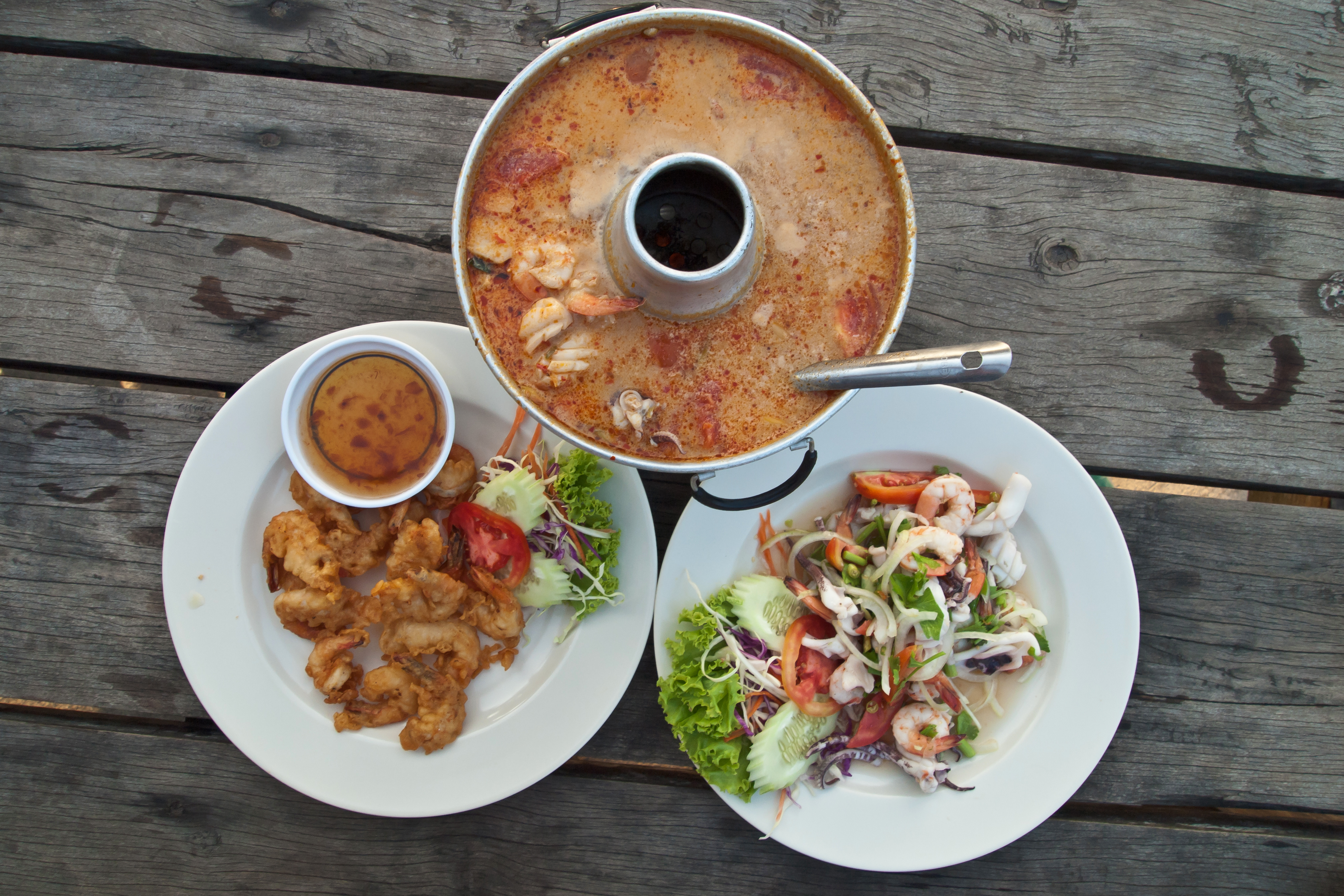
Thai seafood set: shrimp soup, shrimp salad and deep-fried shrimp

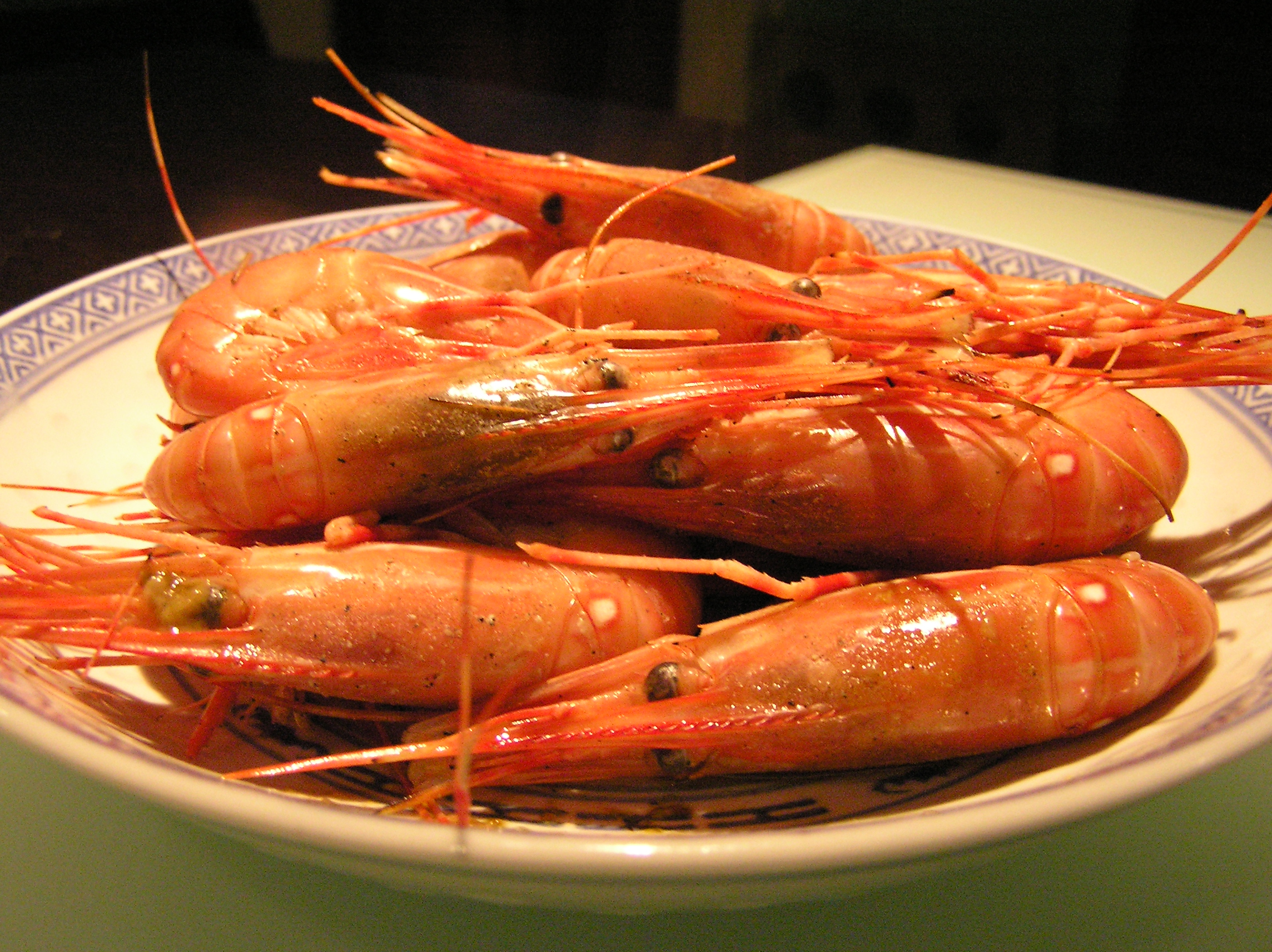
Drunken shrimp

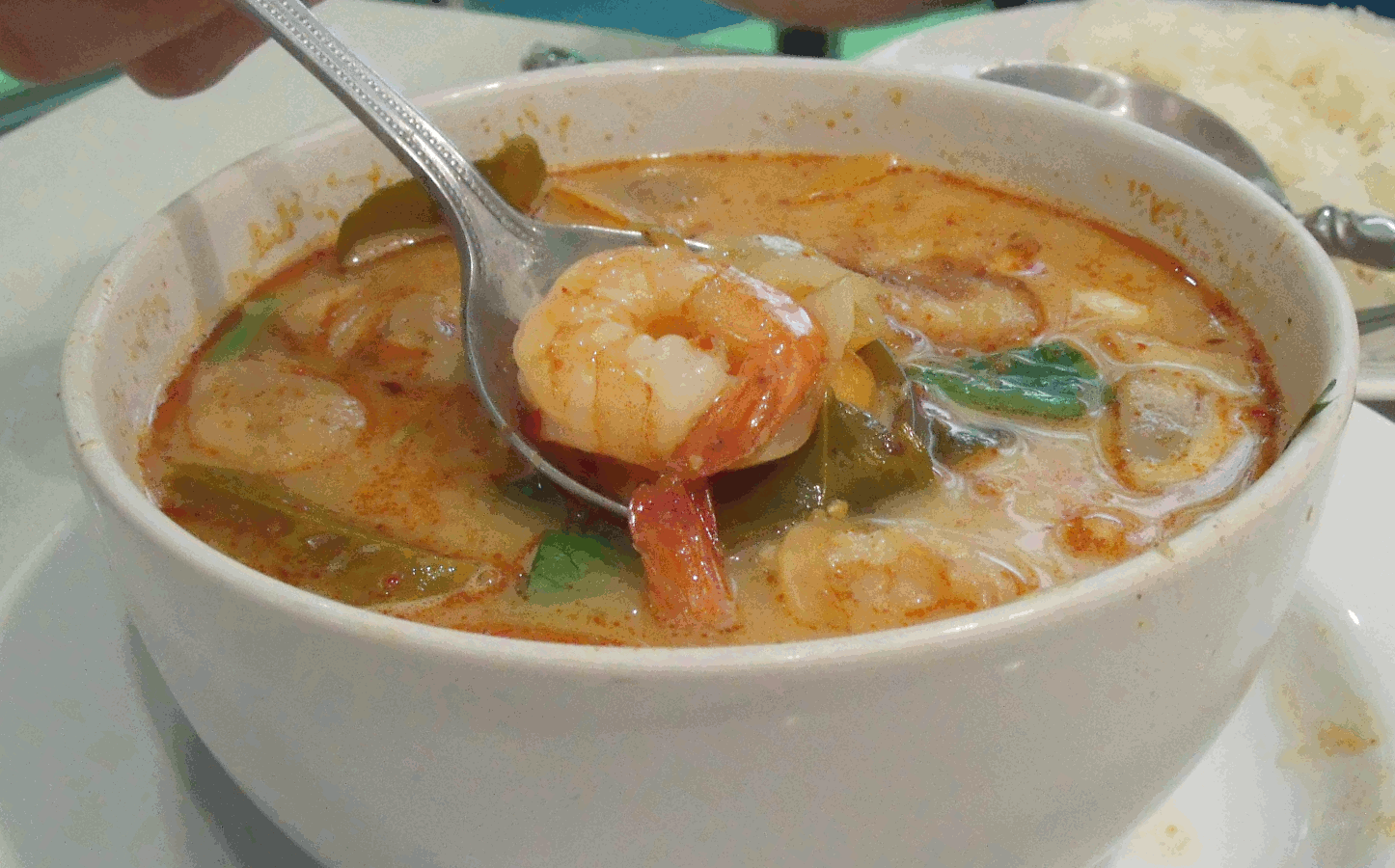
Tom yum goong, a Thai prawn soup

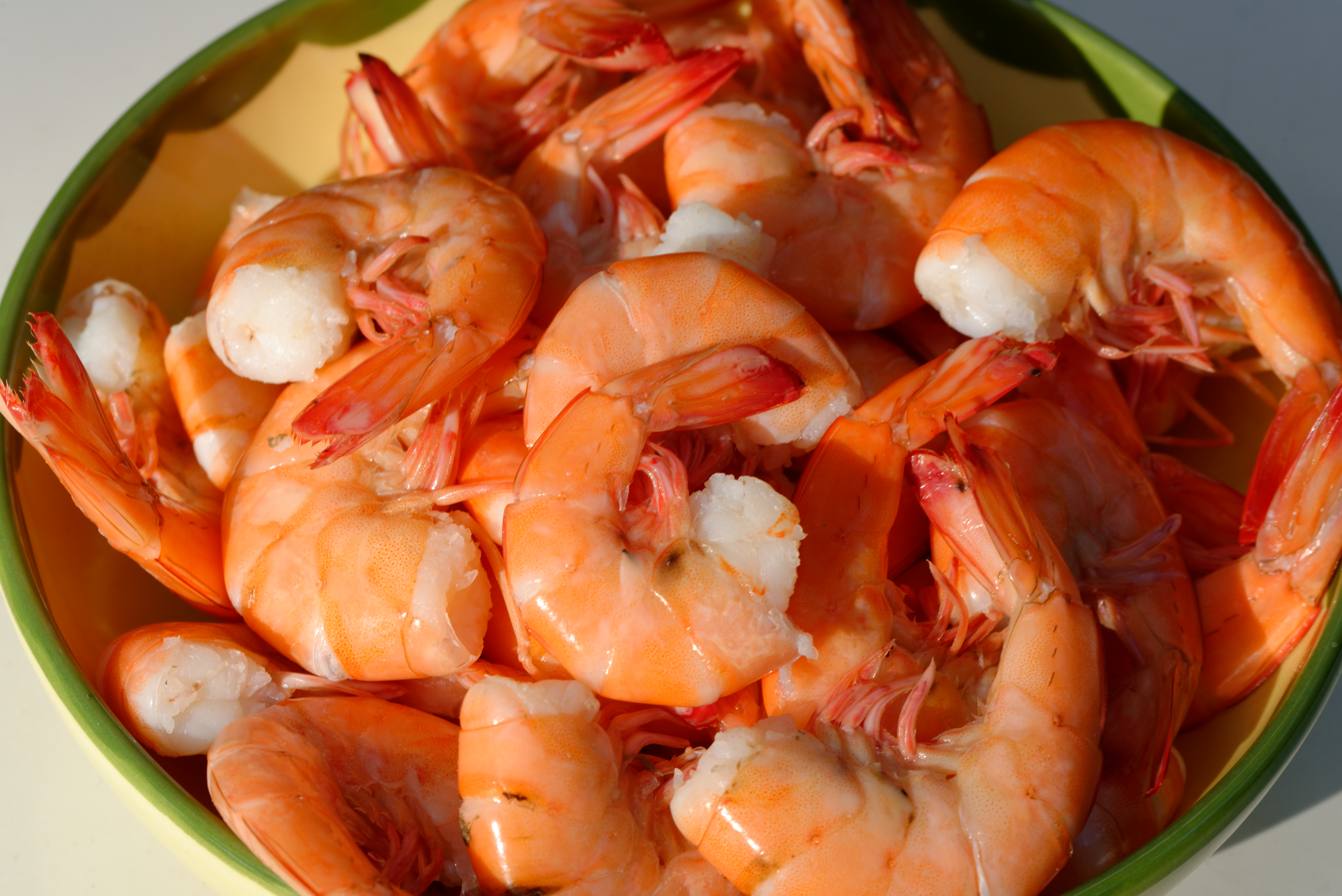
A bowl of boiled prawns

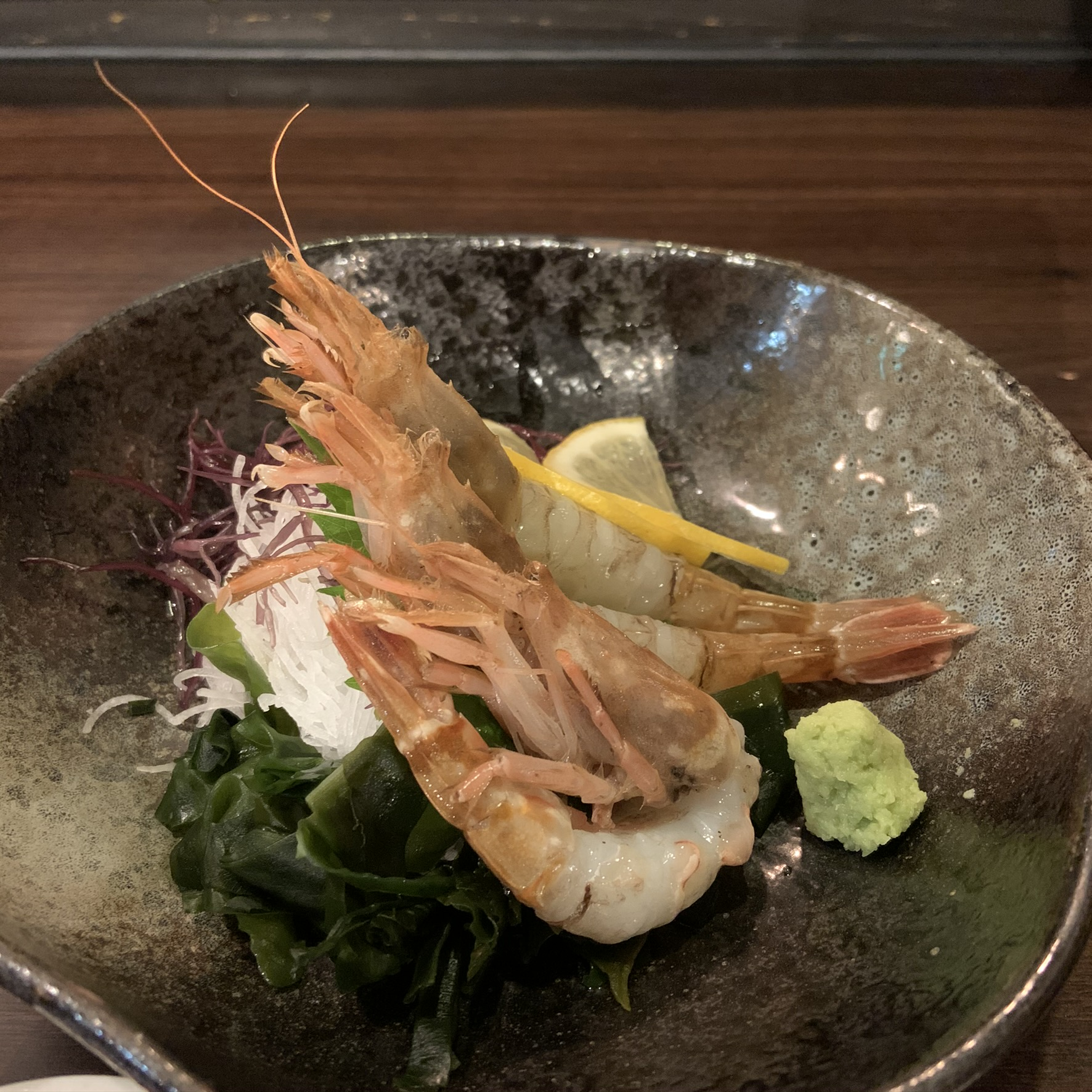
Sashimi

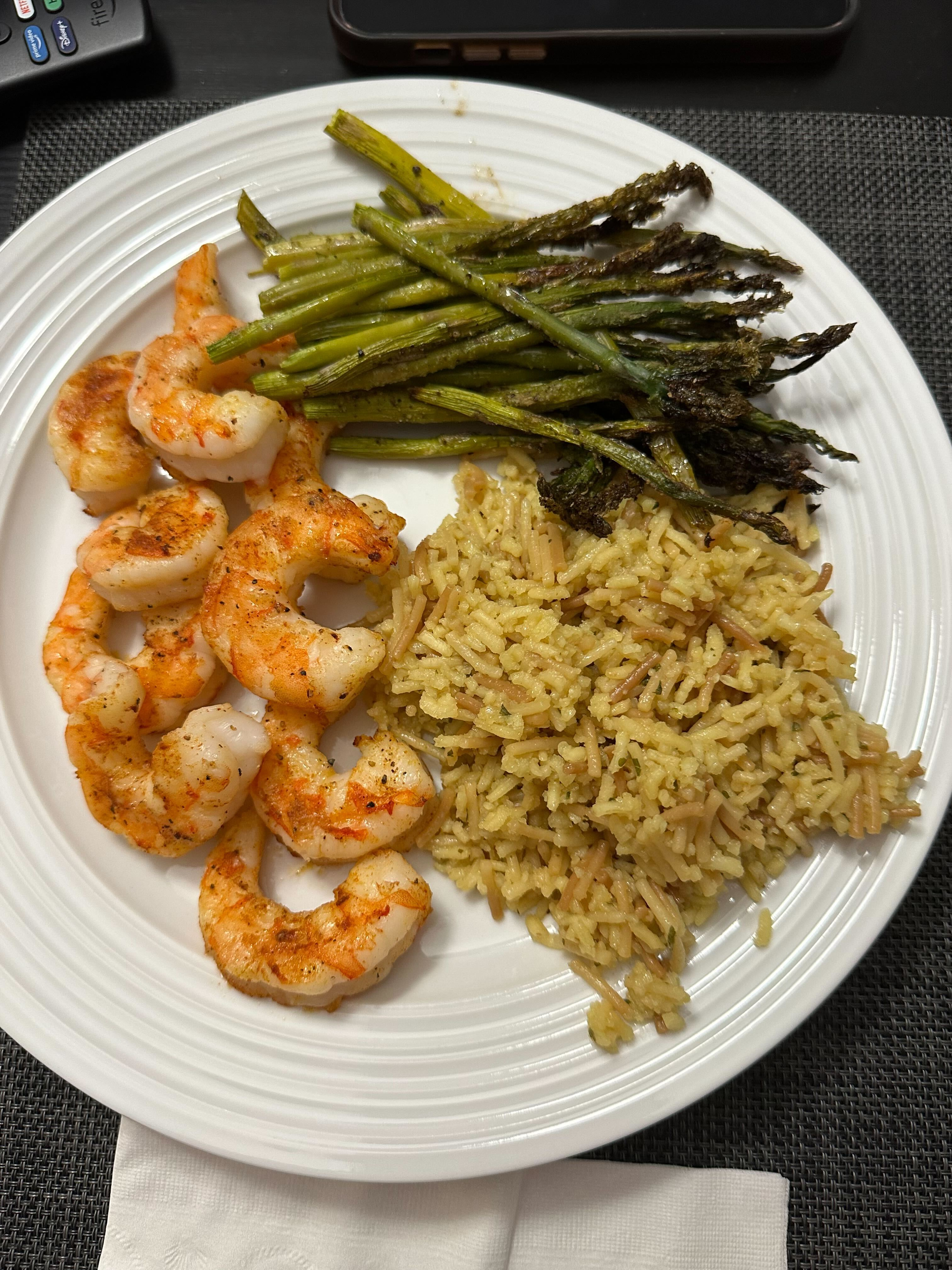
Air-fried shrimp with rice and asparagus

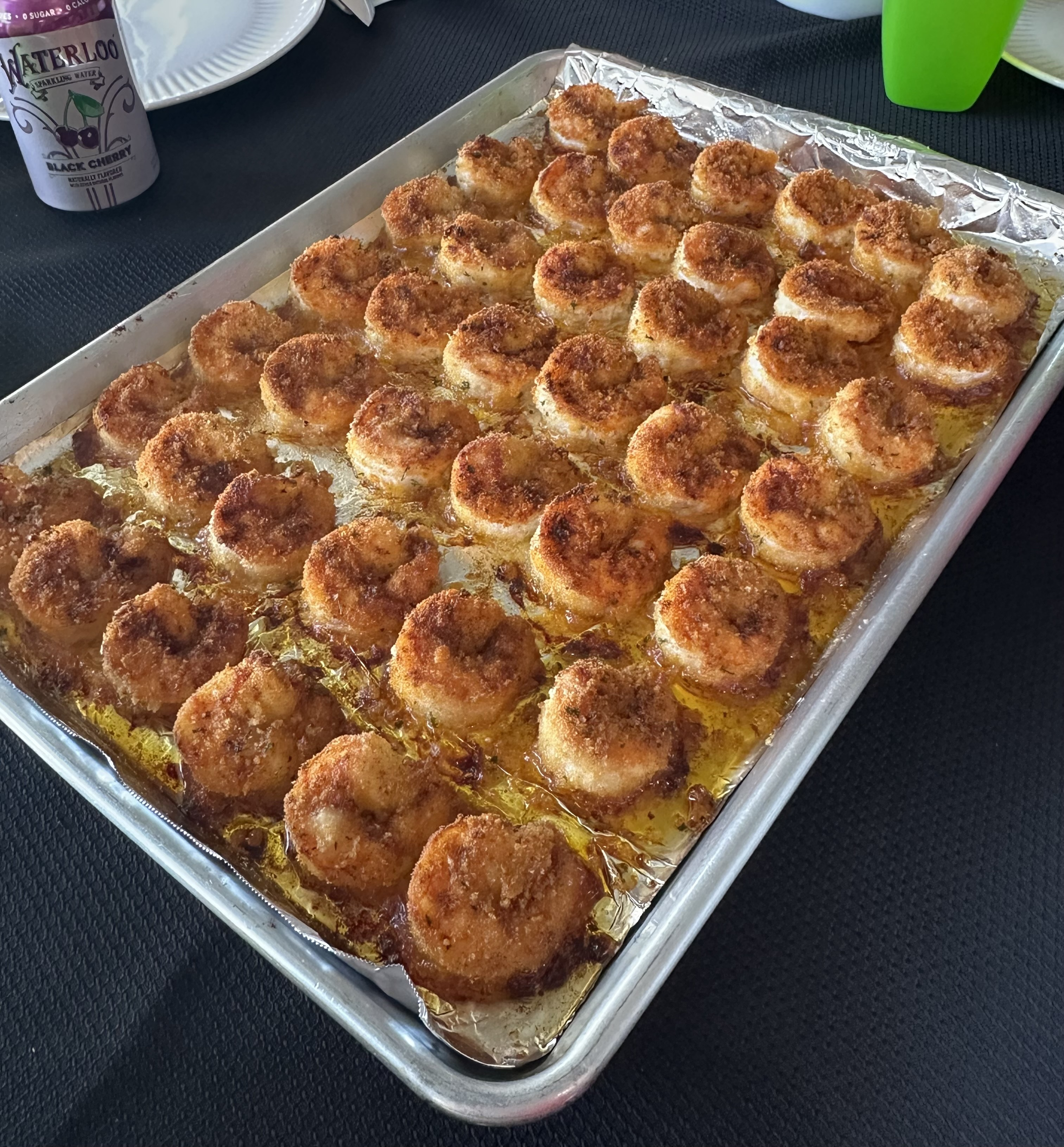
Tray of shrimp oreganata

== Fraud ==
=== Gel-injection adulteration ===
There is a growing food fraud concern in Asia–Pacific where non-food grade gels are injected into shrimp and prawns to increase their weight and visual appeal. Three grams of carboxymethyl cellulose (CMC) can be used to make 50 kilograms of gel, which can be used for one tonne of shrimp. In 2022, Cambodia seized 7 tons of shrimp that had been injected with CMC gel.

=== Laboratory testing ===
To combat food fraud, NIST offers Standard Reference Materials: Wild-caught Shrimp (RM 8258) and Aquacultured Shrimp (RM 8259) for testing.

== See also ==
External videos
- Peeling and Deveining Shrimp - YouTube

- Crayfish as food
- Culinary name
- Eating live seafood
- Fish as food
- Pain in crustaceans
- Seafood
- Shrimp fishery
