= Drunken shrimp =

Chinese shrimp dish

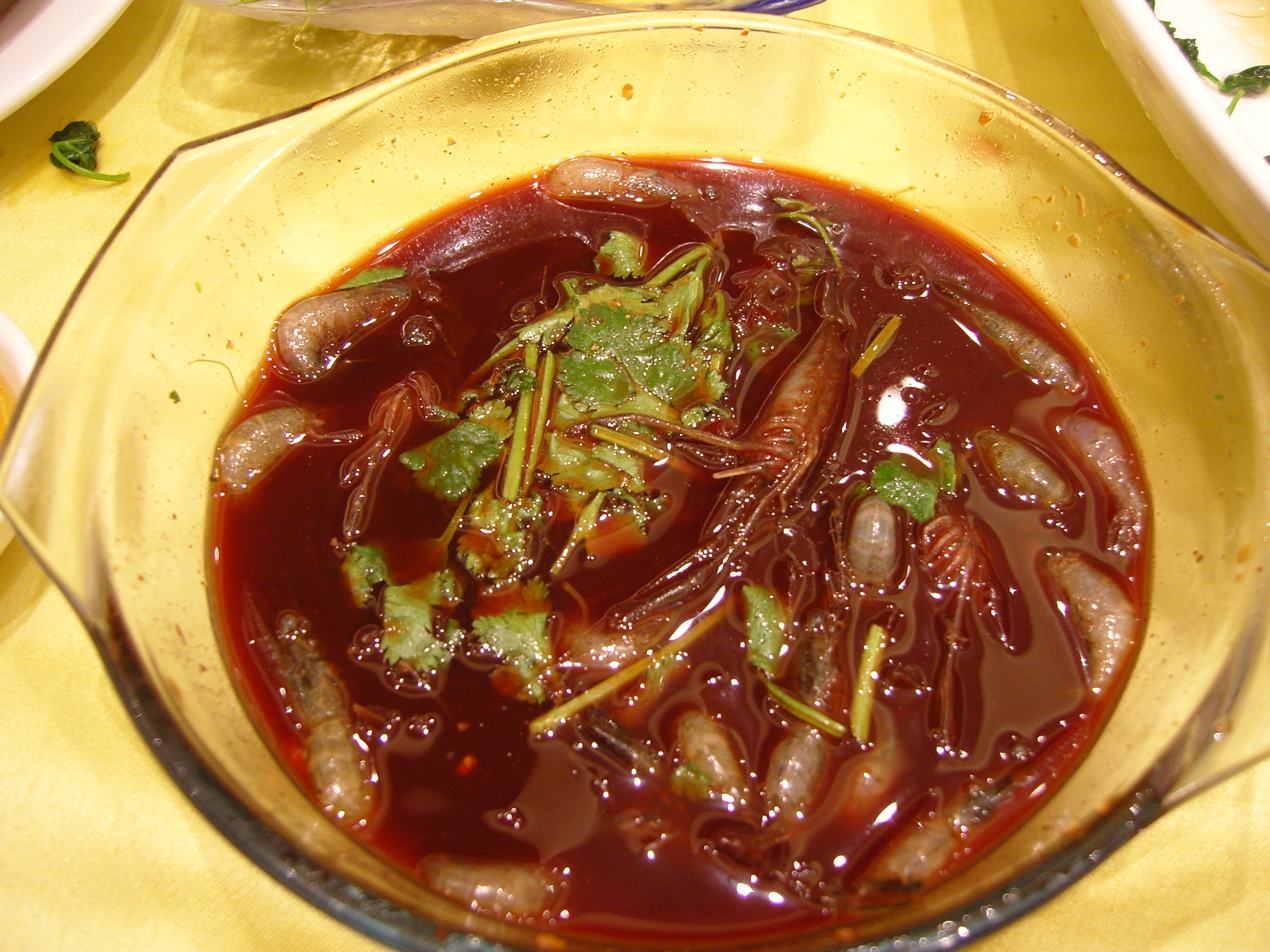
- Drunken shrimp eaten alive
- Place of origin: China
- Associated cuisine: Chinese
- Main ingredients: Prawns, alcohol
- Similar dishes: Odori ebi

Drunken shrimp (simplified Chinese: 醉虾; traditional Chinese: 醉蝦; pinyin: zuìxiā), also known as drunken prawns, is a popular dish in parts of China based on freshwater shrimp eaten cooked or raw. The shrimp are immersed in liquor to make consumption easier, thus the name "drunken". Different parts of China have different recipes for the dish. For example, the shrimp are sometimes soaked in alcohol and then cooked in boiling water rather than served live, and in other recipes cooked shrimp are marinated in alcohol after they are boiled. Another version is based on shrimp that are submerged in a bowl of rice wine. The rice wine forces the shrimp to expel their wastes; the shrimp are then eaten, generally after their movement has ceased.

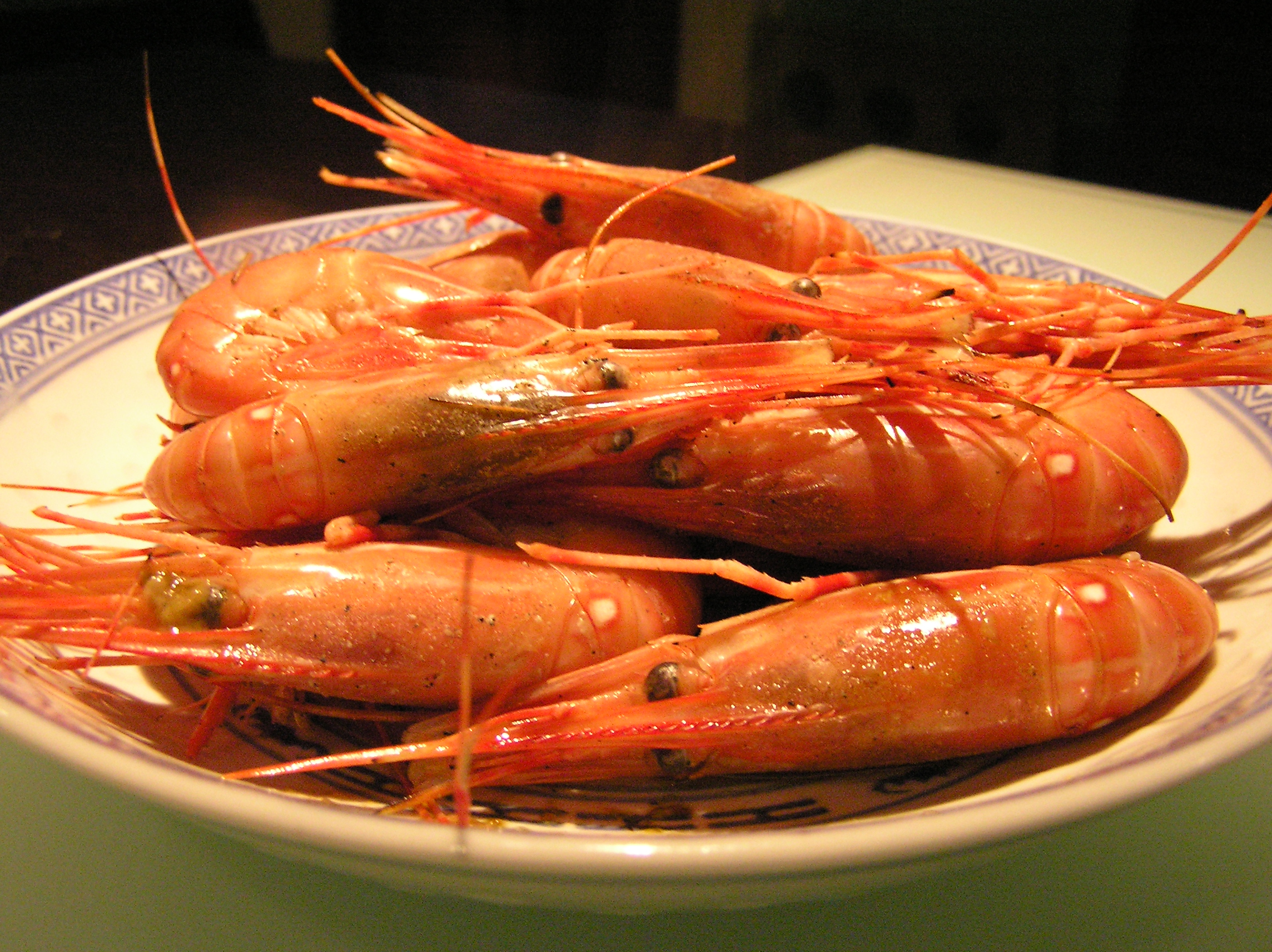
Half-cooked drunken shrimp

Consuming uncooked freshwater shrimps may be a serious health hazard due to the risk of paragonimiasis.

== See also ==
- Odori ebi, Japanese equivalent to drunken shrimp
- Odorigui, general term for dishes of moving, live seafood
- Ikizukuri, the preparation of sashimi from living animals
- Sannakji, Korean live octopus dish

== Sources ==
- Chinese Home-Style Cooking, Foreign Languages Press, Beijing, 7th Printing, 2005, pp. 127. (ISBN 7-119-00407-7)
