= Eating live seafood =

Human consumption of live aquatic organisms

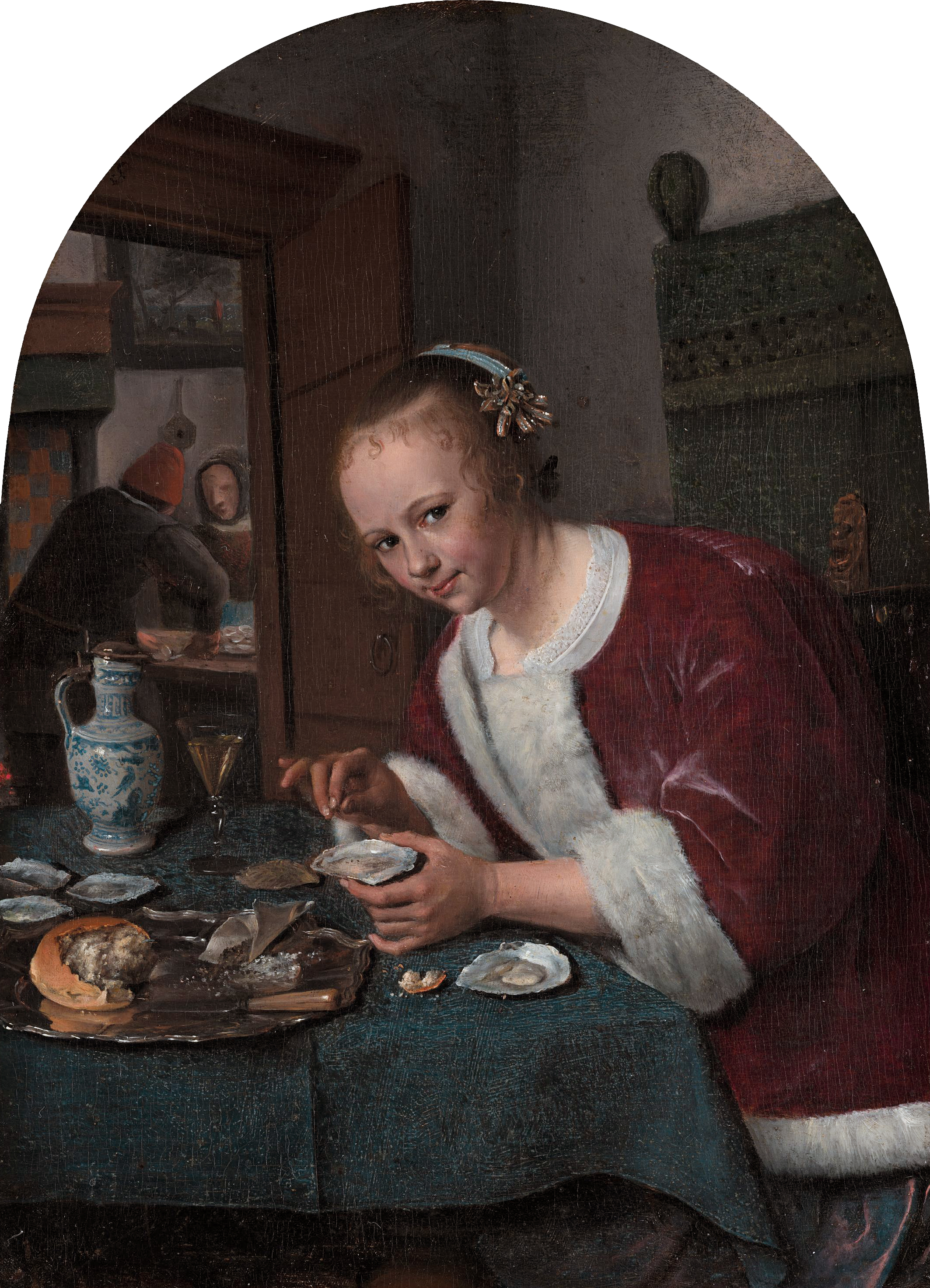
Girl Eating Oysters, circa 1658 by Jan Steen

The practice of eating live seafood, such as fish, crab, oysters, baby shrimp, or baby octopus, is widespread. Oysters are typically eaten live. The view that oysters are acceptable to eat, even by strict ethical criteria, was propounded in the seminal 1975 text Animal Liberation, by philosopher Peter Singer. However, subsequent editions have reversed this position (advocating against eating oysters). Singer has stated that he has "gone back and forth on this over the years", and as of 2010 states that "while you could give them the benefit of the doubt, you could also say that unless some new evidence of a capacity for pain emerges, the doubt is so slight that there is no good reason for avoiding eating sustainably produced oysters".

== Live seafood dishes ==
Location	Name	Image	Description	Video
China	Drunken shrimp		Drunken shrimp is a popular dish in parts of China. It is based on fresh-water shrimp that are placed in a strong liquor, baijiu, and then eaten, often while they are alive. Modified recipes are used in different parts of China. For example, the drunken shrimp can be cooked in boiling water instead of serving them while they are still live. In other recipes, the shrimp are boiled first and then marinated in alcohol.	Drunken Shrimp on YouTube
Japan	Ikizukuri		Ikizukuri, lit. "prepared alive", also called Ikezukuri is the preparation of sashimi made from live seafood. Fish such as tuna, mackerel, bream and salmon is usually used, but sometimes inkfish like octopus or shellfish like shrimp and lobster are used instead. The practice is controversial, and ikizukuri is outlawed in Australia and Germany.	
Japan	Odori ebi		Odori ebi, lit. "dancing shrimp", is a sashimi delicacy in Japan. It includes live baby pink shrimp, usually dunked in Japanese rice wine, wriggling their legs and waving their antenna as they are eaten. The meal is prepared rapidly and quickly served to ensure the shrimp are still alive. Dancing shrimp are also eaten in Thailand, where they are known as Goong Ten, กุ้งเต้น.	Eating live "dancing shrimp" in Thailand on YouTube
Korea	San-nakji		Sannakji is a type of hoe, or raw dish, in Korea. It consists of usually dead but seemingly alive Octopus minor (nakji, sometimes translated as "baby octopus" due to the species' small size), cut into small pieces and immediately served, with a light sesame oil seasoning. The dish is eaten while the pieces are still squirming on the plate.	Eating Live Octopus in Korea – Sannakji on YouTube
Taiwan	Yin Yang fish		Yin Yang fish, or dead-and-alive fish, originated in Taiwan. It is a dish which consists of a deep-fried whole fish (usually carp) that remains alive after cooking. The fish's body is cooked while its head is wrapped in a wet cloth to keep it breathing. The fish is then covered in sauce and served live on a plate. Some chefs say they prepare the fish this way to demonstrate its freshness to the customer. Preparation of this dish is now banned in Taiwan, Australia and Germany.	Eating A Deep Fried Fish That's Still Alive – Huffington Post
Widespread	Live oyster		Oysters are often eaten live.	
Widespread	Live lobster		Nephrops norvegicus is eaten alive in the Faroe Islands.	I eat a live lobster in Japan on YouTube

== Controversy ==
Octopuses are eaten alive in several countries around the world, including the United States. Animal welfare groups have objected to this practice on the basis that octopuses can experience pain. In support of this, since September 2010, octopuses being used for scientific purposes in the European Union are protected by EU Directive 2010/63/EU "as there is scientific evidence of their ability to experience pain, suffering, distress and lasting harm." In the United Kingdom, this means that octopuses used for scientific purposes must be killed humanely, according to prescribed methods (known as "Schedule 1 methods of euthanasia").

London resident Louis Cole ran a YouTube channel in which he ate live seafood. The Guardian commented on the ethical issues raised by the behaviour of Cole that: "It seems objectively less cruel to kill a scorpion instantly than to rear chickens in battery cages or pigs in the most miserable pork farms".

== Health issues ==
In India, the government provides support for an annual fish medicine festival in Hyderabad, where asthma patients are given a live sardine to eat which is supposed to cure their asthma.

Improperly handled food, uncooked food, raw fish consumption and water contamination can transmit parasitic infections. Parasitic infections are common worldwide, although they are major health concerns in tropical countries.

Infection by the fish tapeworm Diphyllobothrium latum is seen in countries where people eat raw or undercooked freshwater fish.

== See also ==
- Eating live animals
- Eating raw fish
- Ethics of eating meat
- Goldfish swallowing
- Monkey brains (cuisine)
- Odorigui, Japanese term for consumption of live seafood while it is still moving
- Pain in crustaceans
- Pain in fish
- Pain in invertebrates
