= Louis Cole (YouTuber) =

Filmmaker and YouTube personality (born 1983)

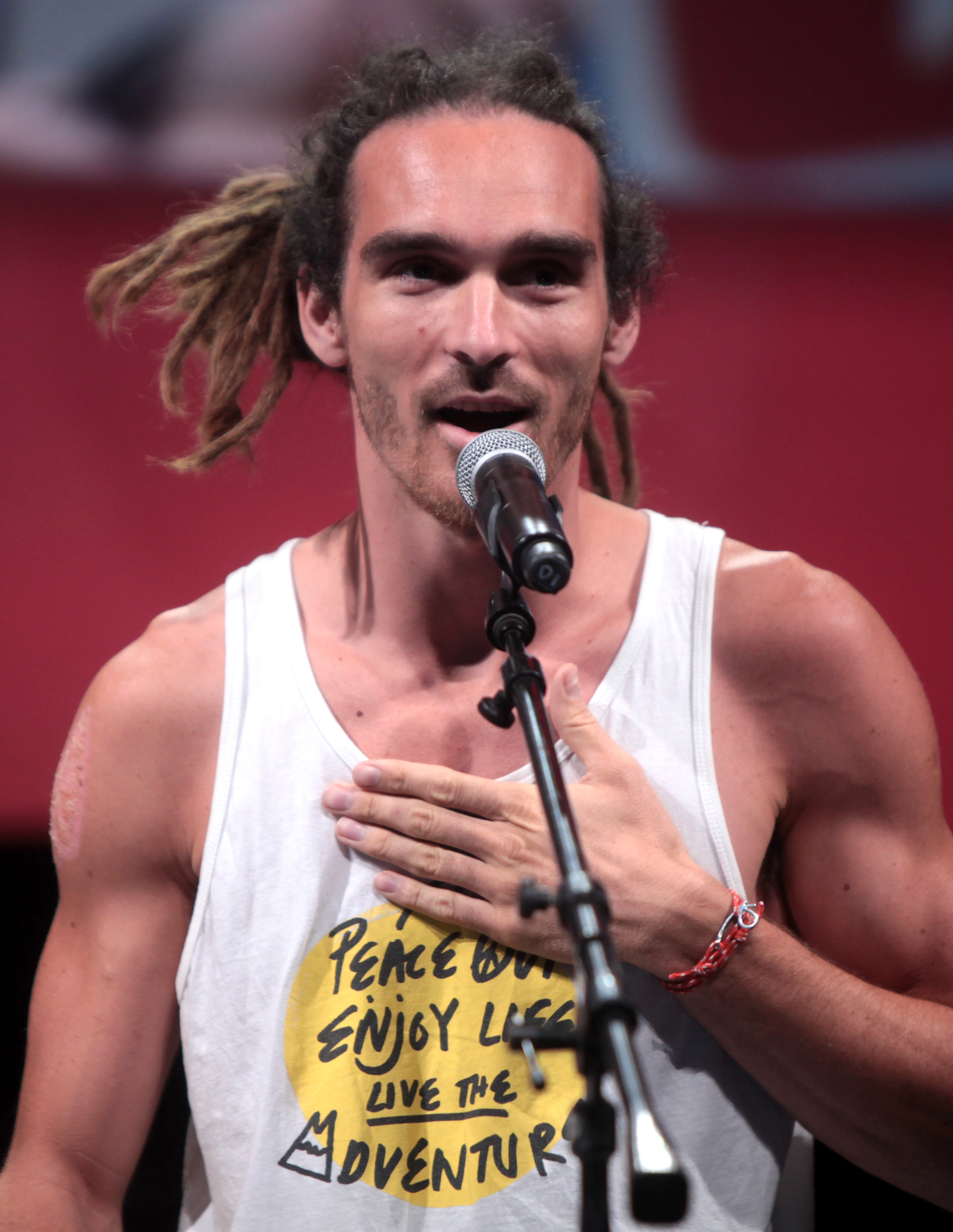
- Cole in June 2014
- Born: 28 April 1983 (age 43); Epsom, England
- Occupation: YouTuber
- Spouse: Raya Encheva (m. 2022)
- Children: 2

YouTube information
- Channel: Louis
- Years active: 2011–present
- Genre: Vlogging
- Subscribers: 1.98 million
- Views: 344 million
- Last updated: 19 June 2026

Louis John Cole (born 28 April 1983), better known by his usernames FoodForLouis and FunForLouis, is an English YouTuber. He became known for posting a daily vlog on his channel FunForLouis, which documented his life and global travels. He became more widely known for his eating stunts on his other channel FoodForLouis, but has since taken these videos down to focus on the positive message of FunForLouis. He was named a top travel influencer by Forbes in 2017.

== Early life ==
Louis John Cole was born in Epsom on 28 April 1983. As a child, he appeared with his family on an episode of the interior design makeover series Homefront.

== Career ==
In 2007, Cole purchased and renovated a double-decker bus, equipping it as a mobile centre to help homeless youth with music and video game facilities. The Boombus project now receives funding from local council wards.

Cole started to post daily vlogs on to his channel FunForLouis on December 31, 2012
(13 years ago). Discovery signed Cole to its Digital Seeker Network in 2015.

In 2019, Cole restarted his FoodForLouis as a Vegan cooking channel. He created a social media travel management agency brand based on his slogan Live The Adventure, often referred to as LTA. Find The Nomads was a clothing company founded by Cole, Steve Booker and Jake Evans. It was started on 9 May 2014 and was dissolved on 28 June 2016.

Beyond Borders involved flying to 22 cities with his friend and pilot Juan-Peter "JP" Schulze over a period of 60–90 days. The journey began in Kern Valley, California, US, on 21 August 2017. The journey has been concluded and the film documenting the trip can be found on discovery+

In 2016, Cole co-founded The Solvey Project with Dave Erasmus with the aim of funding social entrepreneurs. The two presented on stage at "Social Progress - What Works?" in Reykjavík with Icelandic Prime Minister Sigurður Ingi Jóhannsson.

On 22 March 2017, Cole announced on his YouTube channel that he is starting a Kickstarter campaign to fund Beyond Borders - A Film Celebrating Unity, a documentary about flying around the world with JP. The £100,000 goal was reached before the kickstarter ended with a total amount of £111,563 raised by 1,666 backers. The film was released in 2021 on Discovery+.

== Controversies ==
=== 2012 ===
In April 2012, Cole posted a video of himself to his YouTube channel FoodForLouis that showed him eating a live goldfish. This caused the RSPCA to prepare a case against him under the Animal Welfare Act 2006. Since he had previously only eaten invertebrates, the fish was the first incident in which he may have broken the law. He denied that it caused unnecessary suffering and claimed that the RSPCA was "wasting its time" in pursuing the case. Despite this, the case was settled with Cole admitting his guilt and receiving a caution, thus avoiding a trial and a possible criminal record. He has received death threats from some animal rights activists.

Cole has eaten a rabbit and pigeon found as roadkill, a frog, a raw heart, locusts, maggots, ragworms, and scorpions. He has claimed that his videos are not cruel and that he kills the animals quickly to avoid any unnecessary suffering, and argues that viewers' disgust is based on ignorance of or bias against other culinary cultures.

=== 2016 ===
In January 2016, while driving in New Zealand with his girlfriend (now wife) Raya, Cole was pulled over for speeding 41 km/h over the speed limit. While the officer caught him travelling at 141 km/h (87 mph), he used discretion to officially register it as 139 km/h. Since he was registered under 40 km/h over the limit, Cole received a NZD$400 fine instead of automatic loss of licence under New Zealand law. The story made national headlines in New Zealand.

In August 2016, Cole was criticized for visiting North Korea and making a vlog about it. He was accused of promoting North Korea and his videos were described as propaganda for the North Korean regime. He has stated that he disagrees with the ideology of the regime and that the content was not funded by the North Korean government.

== Personal life ==
Cole married Raya Encheva, a Bulgarian vegan YouTuber, in 2022. They have two children together, and split their time between Brighton and the Costa Rican district of San Mateo.
