= San-nakji =

Raw octopus dish in Korean cuisine

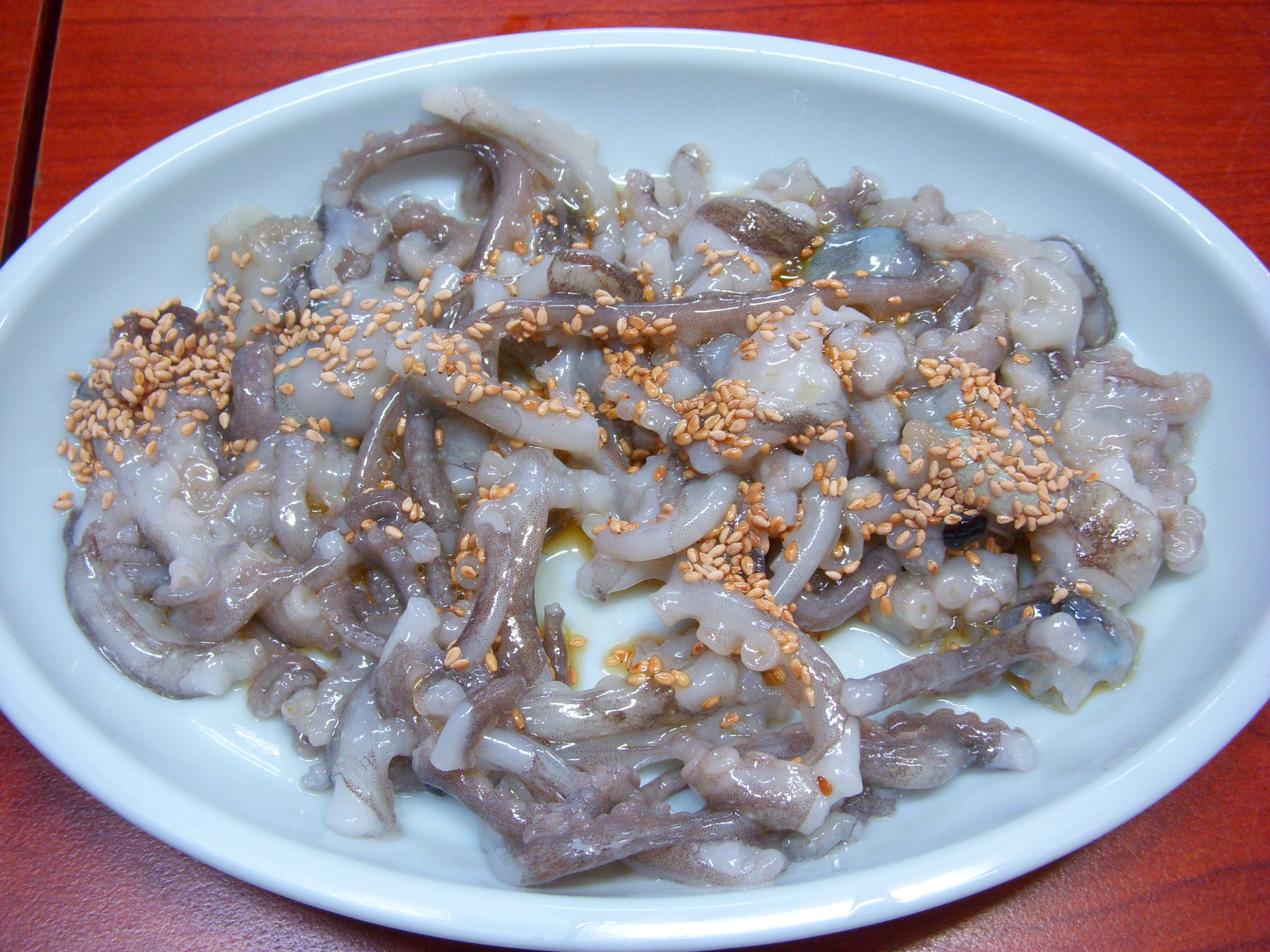
- Type: Hoe
- Place of origin: Korea
- Associated cuisine: Korean cuisine
- Main ingredients: Long arm octopus

Korean name
- Hangul: 산낙지
- RR: sannakji
- MR: sannakchi
- IPA: [saːn.nak̚.t͈ɕi]

Video of San-nakji

San-nakji (Korean: 산낙지) is a variety of hoe (raw dish) made with long arm octopus (Octopus minor), a small octopus species called nakji in Korean and is sometimes translated into "baby octopus" due to its relatively small size compared to the giant octopus (Enteroctopus dofleini). The octopus is most commonly killed before being cut into small pieces and served, with the nerve activity in the octopus's tentacles making the pieces move posthumously on the plate while served.

The octopus's highly complex nervous system, with two-thirds of its neurons localised in the nerve cords of its arms, lets the octopus show a variety of reflex actions that persist even when they have no input from the brain. Less commonly, a live octopus is eaten whole. The dish is sprinkled with sesame oil and toasted sesame seeds. Animal rights activists, including People for the Ethical Treatment of Animals (PETA), have protested the dish as animal cruelty, arguing that octopuses feel pain, while proponents contend that the octopus is killed before being served and that the tentacles' movement is only residual nerve activity.

== Language difference ==
Vocabularies in the two Koreas differ on nakji: South Koreans call Octopus minor, a small kind of octopus (often mistranslated as "baby octopus") nakji, while North Koreans call a squid nakji (nakchi in McCune–Reischauer romanization).

== Safety ==
Consuming sannakji can be dangerous especially for diners who are intoxicated. Octopuses' limbs contain neurons, where the extremities continue to move and the suction cups along its tentacles maintain their gripping power that might attach to one's throat, even after getting detached from the body and doused with sesame oil, which presents a potentially fatal choking hazard.

A 2018 forensic study of two choking deaths identified alcohol intoxication (blood alcohol concentration 0.140%) and pre-existing cardiovascular disease (cerebral infarction and angina pectoris) as contributing risk factors, with the octopus's suction cups found lodged in the epiglottis and laryngeal inlet. In October 2023, an 82-year-old man in Gwangju choked to death after a piece of san-nakji became lodged in his throat, suffering cardiac arrest before first responders could revive him.

A 2010 study of Octopuses from Korea's west coast found that heavy metals including cadmium, copper, and zinc accumulate primarily in the internal organs, with copper reaching mean concentrations of 354.8 mg/kg (dry weight) due to hemocyanin in octopus blood; however, the study concluded that consumption should have no adverse effects on humans based on FAO/WHO provisional tolerable weekly intake standards.

== Prevalence ==
Sannakji is served in Korean restaurants that serve sliced raw fish, but it also can be found at bars as a snack to accompany alcoholic beverages, such as soju.

== See also ==
- Drunken shrimp, shrimp sometimes eaten alive in Chinese cuisine
- Ikizukuri, the preparation of sashimi from living animals
- Odori ebi, shrimp eaten alive in Japanese cuisine, and odorigui, the general practice involving seafood
