= Ikizukuri =

Preparing sashimi from live seafood

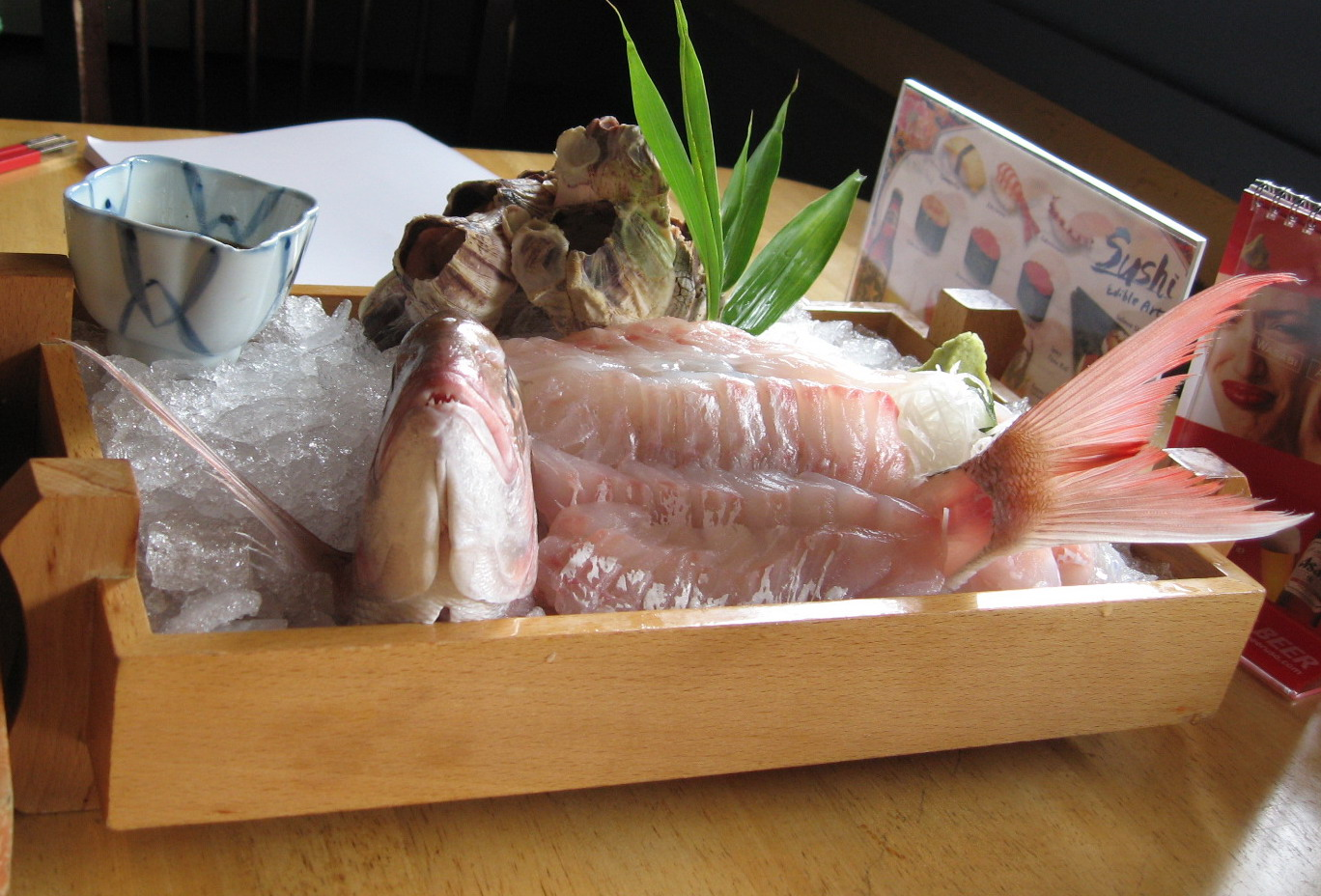
Fish served as ikizukuri

Ikizukuri (生き作り), also known as ikezukuri (活け造り) (roughly translated as "prepared alive"), is the preparing of sashimi (raw fish) from live seafood. In this Japanese culinary technique, the most popular sea animal used is fish, but octopus, shrimp, and lobster may also be used. The practice is controversial owing to concerns about the animal's suffering, as it is seemingly alive when served.

Freshly served ikizukuri

== Preparation and serving ==
The restaurant may have one or several tanks of live sea animals for a customer to choose from. There are different styles in which a chef may serve the dish. The most common way is to serve it on a plate, with the filleted meat, skin still attached, assembled on top of the skeleton. The beating heart may be visible.

Ikizukuri is usually chopped using the ike jime technique, in which the least possible number of cuts (usually three) are used. It is believed that this is more humane, which in turn leads to a better flavor, as a fish in pain would release more lactic acid. They are usually presented with the head still whole so that customers are able to see the continuing gill movements.

=== Frog ===
Frogs can also be served in this manner. The frog is sliced in half, with one half skinned, and its legs are removed. The inedible parts may be put on an iced platter, as part of the display, then simmered in soup. The meat is tender, as frogs have fine muscle fibre. Frog ikizukuri may be prepared in front of the diner.

== Popularity ==
Ikizukuri is not popular with the general Japanese public, for whom eating live animals is seen as disgusting. The dish is also expensive, further keeping it niche. Food writer John Ashburne theorized that the appeal of ikizukuri is that it can be used as a way to flaunt power and wealth. Some restaurants may serve ikizukuri as a publicity stunt, in order to get television attention.

Reportedly, ikizukuri was a favorite dish of Kim Jong-Il, who was introduced to it by his Japanese-born personal chef, Kenji Fujimoto.

== Legality ==
The practice is banned in Australia and Germany. The state of New York introduced legislation to ban the dish in 2025.

== See also ==
- Eating live seafood
- Pain in fish
- Pain in crustaceans
- Odorigui, the consumption of live seafood while it is still moving
- Yin Yang fish
- Swimming to Sea
