= List of shrimp dishes =

External videos
- Eating live "dancing shrimp" in Thailand

This is a list of notable shrimp dishes. It includes dishes that use shrimp as a primary ingredient. Many different dishes are prepared using shrimp.

== Shrimp dishes ==
Name	Image	Origin	Description
Aguachile		Mexico	A dish composed of raw shrimp marinated in a broth seasoned with chili peppers, lime juice, and red onion.
Awadhi prawns		India	King prawns marinated with chili powder, turmeric, salt, lime juice, ginger, and garlic, then fried and garnished with coriander leaves
Bagoong alamang		Philippines	A condiment made of partially or completely fermented shrimp fry and salt. The fermentation process also results in fish sauce called patis.
Balchão		India	A spicy seafood dish made from fish or prawns in a dark red and fiery tangy sauce. Balchão is almost like pickling and can be made days in advance without reheating. The traditional balchão uses a paste made from dried shrimp known as galmbo in Konkani. Many people leave out the dried shrimp paste as this lends a fairly strong fishy flavour to the dish. Is often bottled and can be eaten as a side dish.
Biyaring		Philippines	A type of kinilaw. Made with live small shrimp marinated in a mixture of vinegar and acidic citrus juices.
Cahuamanta		Mexico	Usually prepared as soup, containing manta ray, shrimp and vegetables. Can also be prepared as tacos.
Camaron rebosado		Philippines	Deep-fried battered shrimp served with sweet and sour sauce.
Chingri Malai Curry		India Bangladesh	A popular Bengali curry made from tiger prawns (bagda chingri) and king prawns (golda chingri) and coconut milk and flavoured with spices.
Cincalok		Malaysia	Made of fermented small shrimp or krill, usually served as a condiment together with chillis, shallots and lime juice. It is a fish paste, similar to bagoong alamang in the Philippines.
Coconut shrimp (crunchy)			Shrimps coated with a flaked coconut and bread crumb mix, and then deep fried.
Daab chingri		India Bangladesh	A Bengali prawn curry, cooked and served in a green coconut shell.The interior ingredients are large prawns, butter or ghee or mustard oil, onions, turmeric powder, chopped green chilli, garlic paste and ginger paste. On top are various spices. The curry is cooked and served in a green coconut shell.
Dancing shrimp		Japan; Thailand	Odori ebi, lit. "dancing shrimp", is a sashimi delicacy in Japan. It includes live baby pink shrimp wriggling their legs and waving their antennae as they are eaten. The meal is prepared rapidly and quickly served to ensure the shrimp are still alive. In a parallel to the drunken shrimp below, dancing shrimp are usually dunked in sake. Dancing shrimp are also eaten in Thailand, where they are known as Goong Ten, กุ้งเต้น.
Dobin mushi		Japan	Traditional seafood broth, steamed and served in a dobin tea pot with shrimp, chicken, soy sauce, lime, and matsutake mushroom.
Drunken shrimp		China	External videos: Drunken Shrimp – YouTube; A popular dish in parts of China, based on fresh-water shrimp that are placed in a strong liquor, baijiu, and then eaten, often while they are alive. Modified recipes are used in different parts of China. For example, the drunken shrimp can be cooked in boiling water instead of serving them while they are still live. In other recipes, the shrimp are boiled first and then marinated in alcohol.
Dynamite roll		Canada	A Western-style sushi, common in Western Canada. Usually contains a piece of prawn tempura and masago (capelin roe), with vegetables like radish sprouts, avocado and/or cucumber, as well as Japanese mayonnaise.
Ebi furai		Japan	Straightened and breaded deep fried prawn, a popular ingredient of bento.
Ebinigirizushi		Japan	Hand-pressed sushi, consists of an oblong mound of sushi rice that the chef presses between the palms of the hands to form an oval-shaped ball, and a peeled and boiled shrimp or ebi as neta (topping) draped over the rice ball.
Ebitempura		Japan	A popular part of tempura set, battered and deep fried shrimp (ebi) with typical fluffy and crisp structure.
Gambas al ajillo		Spain	A type of tapas dish featuring shrimp, garlic and olive oil
Ginataang kalabasa		Philippines	A type of ginataan soup made with calabaza, green beans, and shrimp
Seafood gumbo		United States	Gumbo is a stew or soup that probably originated in southern Louisiana during the 18th century. Seafood gumbo typically consists of a strongly-flavored stock, shrimp and crabmeat, sometimes oyster, a thickener, and seasoning vegetables, which can include celery, bell peppers, and onions (a trio known in Cajun cuisine as the "holy trinity"). Gumbo is often categorized by the type of thickener used: the African vegetable okra, the Choctaw spice filé powder (dried and ground sassafras leaves), or roux, the French base made of flour and fat.
Halabos na hipon		Philippines	Freshly caught shrimp that is boiled in little water and salt. The modern way of cooking it is adding a little soda like Sprite to add a sweetish flavor.
Prawn noodles		China; Malaysia; Singapore	A noodle soup dish based on prawns. A stock is made using dried shrimp, plucked heads of prawns, white pepper, garlic and other spices. More prawns are added, together with egg noodles and bean sprouts, and possibly pork or fish. This forms a richly flavoured dark soup which is topped with fried shallots and spring onion. Traditionally, lard is added to the soup, but this is now less common due to health concerns. The dish is usually served with freshly cut red chili slices in a light soy sauce and lime. Hae mee literally means "prawn noodles".
Har gow		China	A dumpling served in dim sum, sometimes called a "shrimp bonnet" for its pleated shape. Traditionally, should have at least seven and preferably ten or more pleats imprinted on its wrapper. The wrappers are made with boiling water, to which wheat starch, tapioca starch, oil and a small amount of salt are added. The filling contains shrimp, cooked pork fat, bamboo shoots, scallions, cornstarch, sesame oil, soy sauce, sugar, and other seasonings. The pouch-shaped dumpling is then steamed in a bamboo basket until translucent. Listed at number 34 on World's 50 most delicious foods readers' poll compiled by CNN Go in 2011.
Tainan shrimp rice		Taiwan	An iconic Taiwanese delicacy featuring small, fresh fire-shrimp stir-fried with oyster sauce, mirin and lard, served over rice that has been cooked in a savory, aromatic broth.
Kaeng som		Thailand	A sour and spicy shrimp curry or soup with vegetables, with a characteristic sour taste which comes from tamarind. A paste called nam phrik kaeng som which includes shrimp paste, shallots, and sometimes red chili peppers forms the base for the curry. The curry is usually sweetened with palm sugar and served with steamed rice. Fish that keep their consistency after boiling, such as the common snakehead, can be used instead of shrimp. Another variant uses fish eggs. Kaeng som is .
Longjing prawns		China	Live shrimp are coated with egg white and moistened starch, fried in lard at a medium-low temperature for 15 seconds, removed from the oil and drained when jade-white in colour, and then quickly stir-fried over extreme heat with boiling water infused with Longjing tea, tea leaves and Shaoxing wine. This dish consists primarily of white and green colours; the colours are elegant and the flavour is light and fragrant. It is also known as shrimp stir-fried with Dragon Well tea, and is a specialty of Hangzhou in the Zhejiang Province.
Mie goreng udang		Chinese Indonesian	A variant of Indonesian mie goreng (fried noodle) with shrimp.
Moon shrimp cake		Taiwan	A popular Taiwanese dish made from pounded shrimps, garlic, and pork fat spread on a circular spring roll wrapper. Another wrapper is placed over the top and the cake is panfried and served with sweet chili sauce.
Nasi goreng udang		Indonesia	A variant of Indonesian nasi goreng (fried rice) with shrimp.
Nilasing na hipon		Philippines	Shrimp marinated in alcohol, coated in batter, and then fried. The name translates to "drunken shrimp", but it is unrelated to the Chinese dish.
Okoy		Philippines	Deep fried unshelled shrimp pancakes in a batter made from glutinous rice and calabaza
Pineapple shrimp balls		Taiwan	A popular Taiwanese dish made from large shrimp that are peeled, battered, and deep-fried until crisp. These are mixed with pineapple chunks and coated with mayonnaise.
Pininyahang hipon		Philippines	Shrimp in a sweet pineapple and coconut milk sauce.
Popcorn shrimp		United States	Fritter of small shrimps eaten as a finger food.
Potted shrimps		Lancaster	Traditional Lancastrian dish made with brown shrimp flavoured with mace. The dish consists of brown shrimp in mace-flavoured butter, which has set in a small pot. Cayenne pepper and nutmeg may also be included. It is traditionally eaten with bread. The butter acts as a preservative. Potted shrimp was a favourite dish of Ian Fleming who passed on his predeliction for the delicacy to his famous fictional creation James Bond. Fleming reputedly used to eat the dish at Scotts Restaurant on Mount Street in London where it is still served to this day.
Prawn cracker		—	A deep fried cracker and popular snack food, usually based on shrimp and other ingredients that give the taste. Globally widespread, but most prevalent in Southeast Asia.
Prawn cocktail		Great Britain; North America	Shelled prawns in a pink sauce based on mayonnaise and tomato, served in a glass. It was the most popular hors d'œuvre in Great Britain from the 1960s to the late 1980s. In North America the sauce is red, essentially ketchup plus horseradish.
Prawn roll		Australia	Take away, typically sold from stalls or small shops on the side of highways or in restaurants in areas of Australia where prawn fishing is a major industry. Home made or available commercially, usually deep frozen. Typically made with a soft white roll approximately six inches (15 cm) long, stuffed with a dozen or more peeled prawns, lettuce and a thousand island or cocktail style sauce. Cay be eaten cold, deep fried, or coated in tempura batter and deep fried.
Prawn soup		Global	Soup dish prepared using freshwater or saltwater prawns as a primary ingredient. Several varieties of the dish exist in various areas of the world.
Rempeyek udang		Indonesia	A deep-fried savoury cracker made from flour (usually rice flour) with shrimp bound or coated by crispy flour batter.
Saeujeot		Korea	A variety of jeotgal, salted and fermented food made with small shrimp. It is the most consumed jeotgal along with myeolchijeot (salted anchovy jeot) in South Korea, mostly used as an ingredient in kimchi and dipping pastes. The shrimp used for making saeujeot are called jeotsaeu (젓새우) and are smaller and have thinner shells than with ordinary shrimp. The quality of saeujeot largely depends on the freshness of the shrimp. In warm weather, fishermen may immediately add salt for preliminary preservation.
Sambal shrimp		Indonesia	Also known as udang balado, it is made of shrimp cooked in rich, hot and spicy balado or sambal chili pepper sauce. Commonly known in Minangkabau cuisine of West Sumatra.
Sarsa na uyang		Philippines	A dish made from pounded freshwater shrimp, shredded coconut, chilis, ginger, peppercorns and other spices wrapped in coconut leaves and boiled in coconut milk.
Sate udang		Indonesia	Indonesian shrimp satay that uses large shrimps, shelled and cleaned and often with the tails off and lightly grilled. Some recipes call for a marinade of thick coconut milk with sambal (chili paste), powdered Laos (galangal root), ground kemiri (candlenut, one can substitute macadamia nuts in a pinch), minced shallots and pressed garlic.
Sesame shrimp		China	A syncretic dish, commonly found in Chinese restaurants throughout the English-speaking world. The dish is similar to General Tso's chicken but sweet rather than spicy. Battered shrimp is deep-fried, then dressed with a translucent, reddish-brown, semi-thick, sauce made from corn starch, vinegar, wine or Sake, chicken broth, and sugar. Typically served with broccoli and topped with toasted sesame seeds. Chopped almonds may be substituted for the sesame seeds, to produce "almond shrimp".
Shrimp cocktail		Las Vegas	The Golden Gate was the first to serve this fifty cent shrimp cocktail in 1959, now a Las Vegas cliché. Called the "Original Shrimp Cocktail" on the menu, it is a favorite of both locals and tourists. The original Shrimp Cocktail consists of a regular-sized sundae glass filled with small salad shrimp and topped with a dollop of cocktail sauce. In 1991, the price was raised from 50¢ to 99¢ and in 2008 to $1.99. The glass is not padded with lettuce or other fillers, which is often cited as the reason for the Original Shrimp Cocktail's popularity.
Shrimp Creole		Creole	Cooked shrimp in a mixture of whole or diced tomatoes, onion, celery and bell pepper, spiced with Tabasco sauce or another hot pepper sauce and/or cayenne-based seasoning, and served over steamed or boiled white rice. The shrimp may be cooked in the mixture or cooked separately and added at the end. Creole-type dishes combine the qualities of a gumbo and a jambalaya. They are typically thicker and spicier than a gumbo, and the rice is prepared separately and used as a bed for the creole mixture, rather than cooked in the same pot as with a jambalaya. Creole dishes also do not contain broth or roux; instead, the creole mixture is simmered to its desired degree of thickness.
Shrimp curry		India	A typical dish of the Indo-Portuguese cuisine of Goa, Daman and Diu
Shrimp DeJonghe		Chicago	A casserole of whole peeled shrimp blanketed in soft, garlicky, sherry-laced bread crumbs. It can be served as an appetizer or a main course. It has the oldest pedigree of Chicagoan cuisine, having originated in the late 19th or early 20th century at DeJonghe's Hotel and Restaurant.
Shrimp roe noodles		China	A variety of Chinese noodle popular in Hong Kong. One of the special characteristic that distinguish this noodle from the many other varieties of Chinese noodle is the salty shrimp roe forming tiny black spots on strips of the noodles. The noodle is made of wheat flour, salt, tapioca flour, monosodium glutamate (MSG), and shrimp roe. It comes in a palm-sized hard noodle bundle. Because this noodle has some taste of its own, the most common method of cooking is directly boiling the noodles. Soy sauce or additional flavorings can still be added. Depending on the noodle brand, the black dots may disappear after cooking.
Shrimp toast		China	A Chinese dim sum dish which originated over 100 years ago in Canton. Made from small triangles of bread, brushed with egg and coated with minced shrimp and water chestnuts, then cooked by baking or deep frying. It is now a common appetizer around the world. A common variant in the United Kingdom and Australia is "sesame prawn toast", which involves sprinkling sesame seeds before the baking or deep frying process.
Shrimp paste		Southeast Asia	Also known as terasi, belachan, and kapi, is a paste made from fermented ground shrimp mixed with salt. It is commonly used as cooking ingredient to add taste and aroma, especially essential for sambal (chili paste).
Sinigang na hipon		Philippines	A variant of sinigang made with shrimp in a sour broth (usually tamarind-based)
Siomay udang		Chinese Indonesian	A variant of siomay, a type of Chinese-influenced dumpling with shrimp.
Tenmusu		Japan	A rice ball snack (onigiri) topped with a shrimp fritter.
Toast Skagen		Sweden	A popular Swedish appetizer made of toasted bread topped with mix mainly made of shrimp and mayonnaise. Usually garnished with fish roe, dill and lemon.
Tom yum goong		Thailand	Sour and spicy Thai prawn soup prepared with a clear and light broth, spices and shrimp.
Udang telur asin		Indonesia	Fried shrimp coated with ground salted egg.
Vatapá		Brazil	Made from bread, shrimp, coconut milk, and finely ground peanuts and palm oil mashed into a creamy paste. This food is very popular in the North and Northeast, but it is more typical in the northeastern state of Bahia where it is commonly eaten with acarajé, although Vatapá is often eaten with white rice in other regions of Brazil.
White boiled shrimp		China	A type of night dish. Made with shrimp in boiling water and served with the shells. The shrimp is eaten with soy sauce. When finished, people wash their hands in a bowl of warm tea and lemon.

=== Unsorted ===
- Drunken shrimp
- Karides güveç
- Prawn Rougaille
- Prawn soup
- Shrimp in fish sauce

== See also ==
- Fried shrimp: various kinds of fried shrimp
- List of seafood dishes
- Lists of prepared foods
