= Fried shrimp =

Type of food

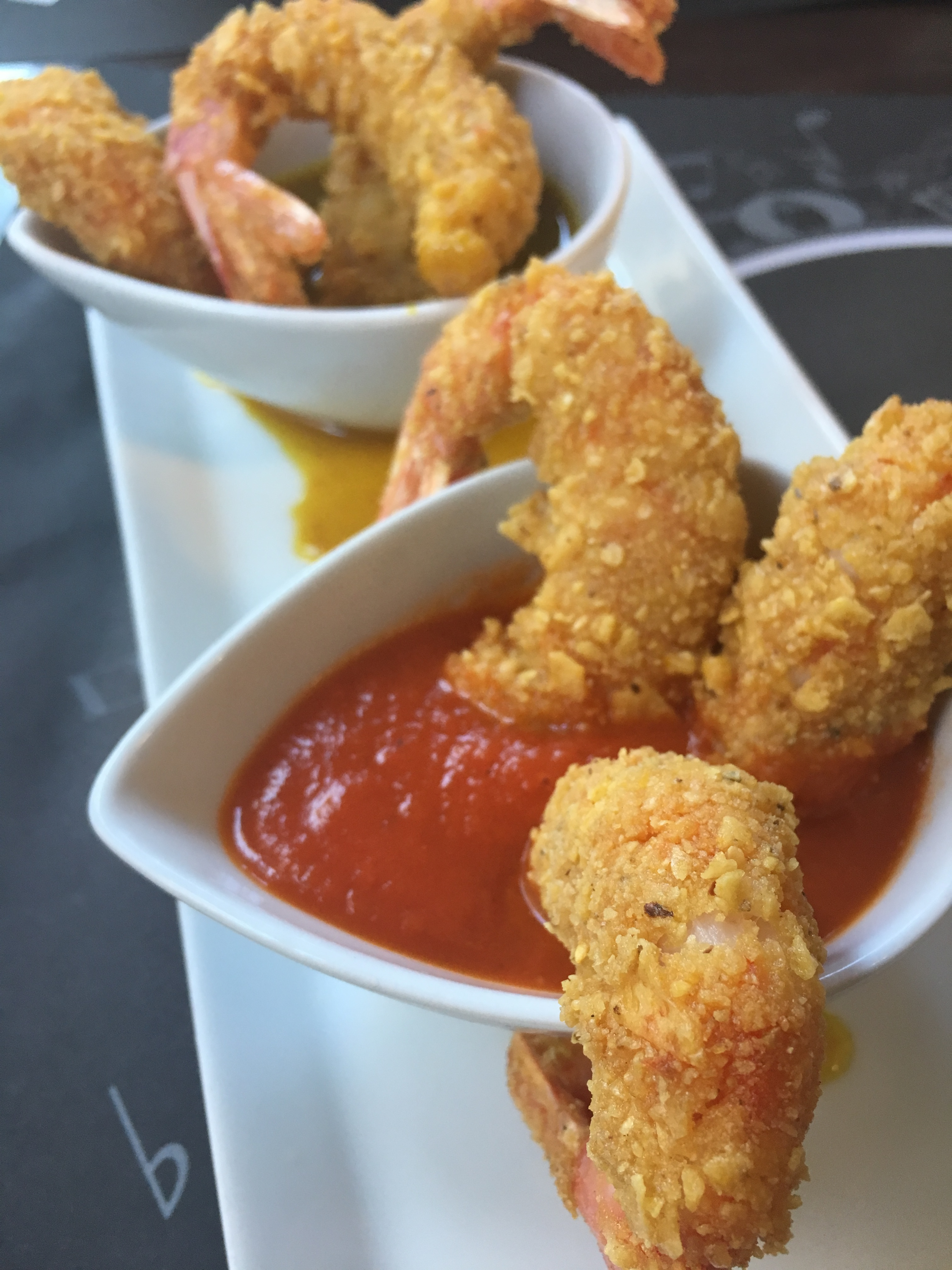
Fried shrimp

Fried shrimp is a seafood dish consisting of shrimp that is battered or breaded and then deep-fried or pan-fried. It is served in various cuisines around the world. The dish can be prepared using different coatings, such as seasoned flour, cornmeal, panko, or tempura batter.

== Popcorn shrimp ==
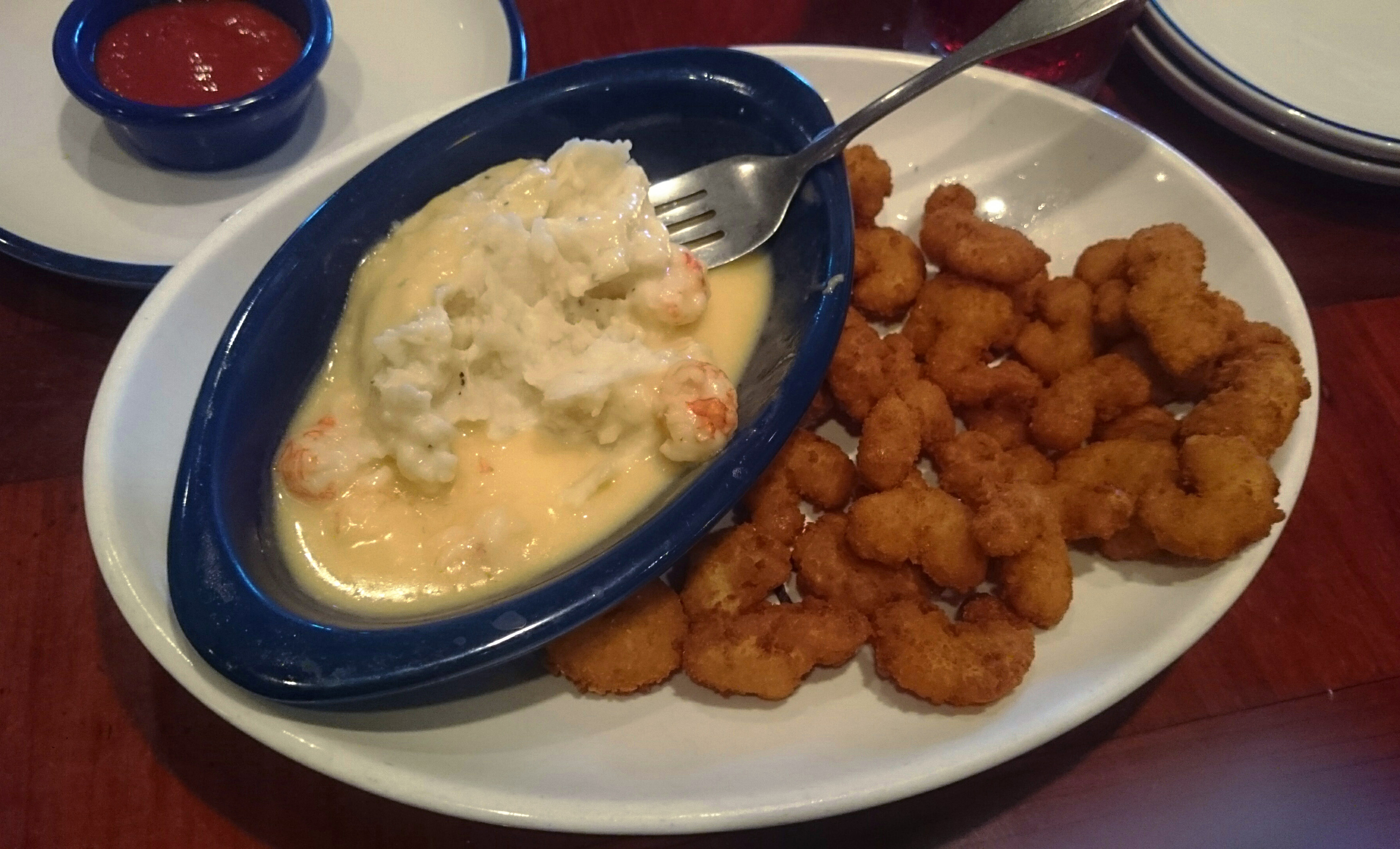
Popcorn shrimp on the right half of the plate

Popcorn shrimp is the name of several small shrimp fritters. Cajun popcorn is a similar dish of peeled and spiced crayfish-tail fritters, in which shrimp could also be used as a substitute for crayfish.

== Coconut shrimp ==
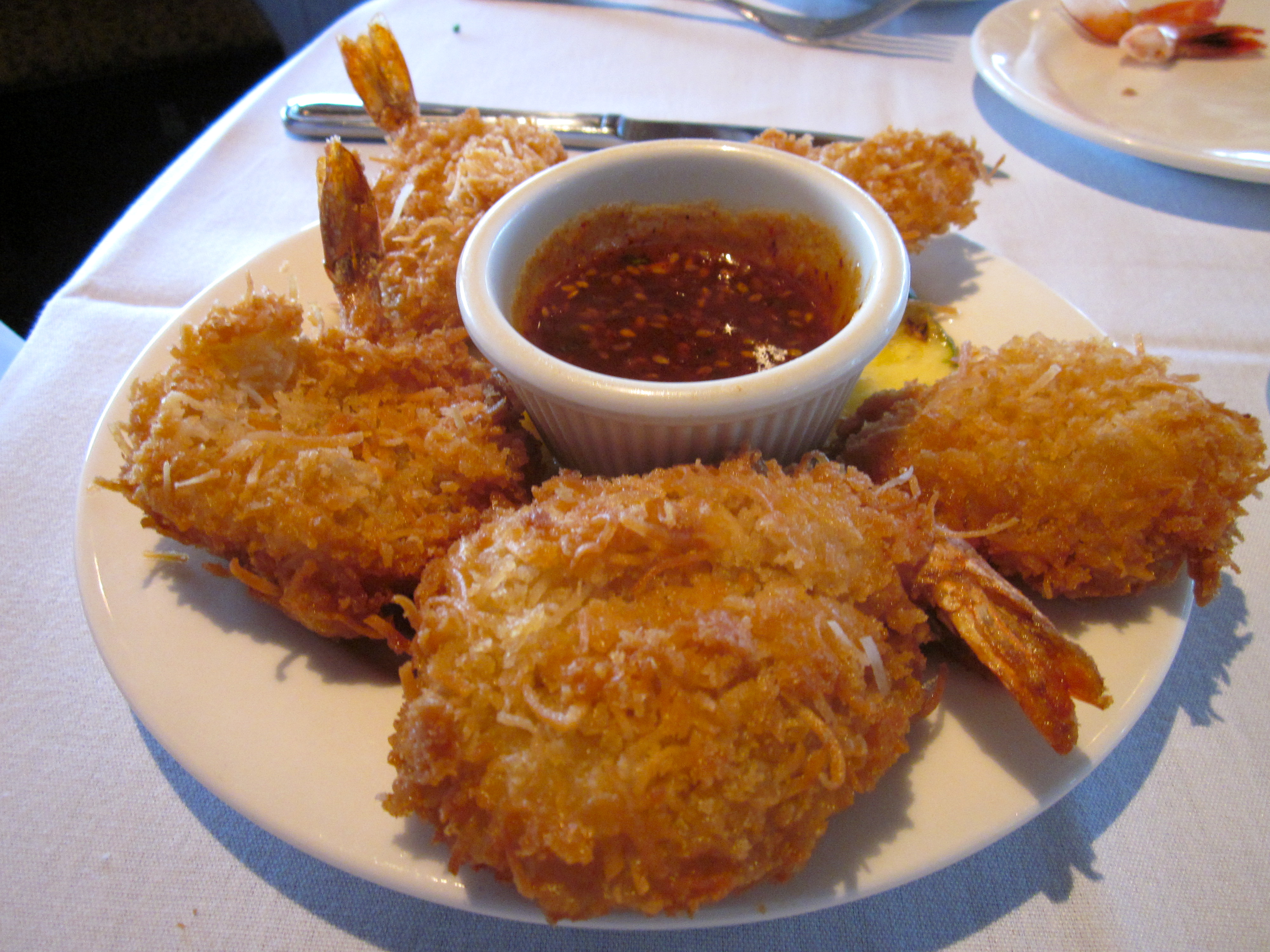
Coconut shrimp with a sweet chili sauce

Crunchy varieties of coconut shrimp dishes are prepared with peeled shrimp dipped in batter, coated with grated coconut, and deep-fried.

== Internationally ==
=== Japan ===
There are two popular deep-fried prawn dishes in Japan, ebi tempura and ebi furai. The difference is that tempura is battered, never breaded, while breaded deep-fries are called furais. Prawn cookings in Japan typically employ a straightening technique, by making several incisions on its belly side, then bend the prawn backwards to form straight prawns which they consider more appealing.

==== Ebi tempura ====
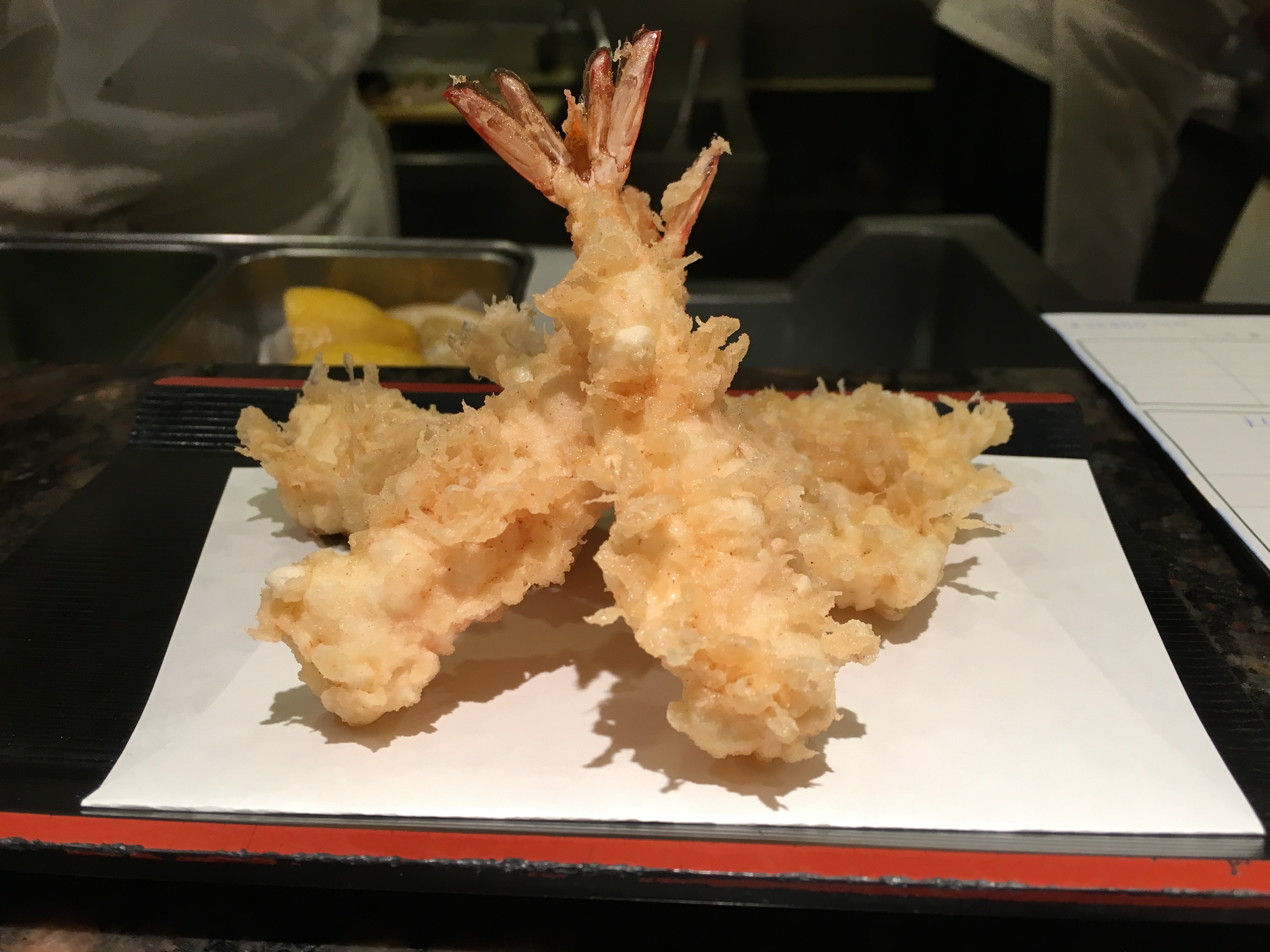
Japanese ebi tempura

Ebi tempura (海老天ぷら) or ebiten is tempura of prawns, with a light fluffy coat. It is served as a main dish, with soy-based dipping sauce or salt. It can also be made into other dishes such as:

- Over noodles: tensoba and tempura udon, but dishes with these names do not necessarily contain prawns. They may be tempura of other ingredients.
- On a bowl of steamed rice: tendon (tempura donburi). In one version, the tempura is dipped in a sauce before serving. This sauce is considerably thicker and sweeter than regular tempura dipping sauce.
- Tenmusu: a rice ball snack (onigiri) topped with a shrimp fritter.

==== Ebi furai ====
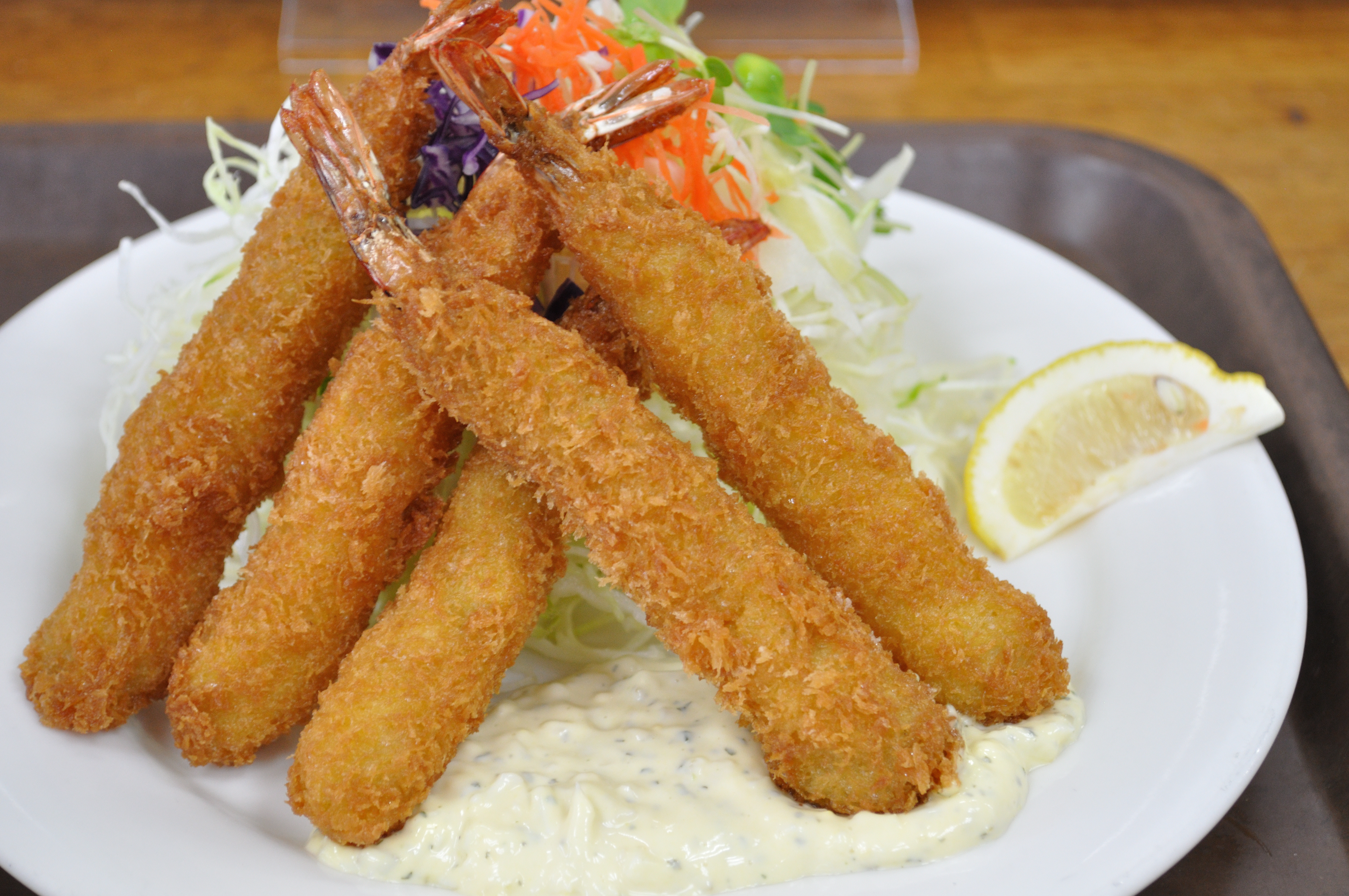
Japanese ebi furai

Ebi furai (海老フライ or エビフライ) is a breaded and deep-fried prawn dish, dark and with a crunchy texture.

Traditionally kuruma ebi was used, but many stores have started using cheaper black tiger shrimp. It is thought that ebi furai was created around 1900 along with similar dishes such as tonkatsu in the Western-food restaurants of Tokyo.

Ebi furai is a popular ingredient of Japanese bento, and ebi furai bentō (海老フライ弁当 or エビフライ弁当) is a common menu item in bentō products.

Ebi furai became a specialty of the city of Nagoya due to a joke made by a popular Japanese tarento (celebrity) Tamori in the 1980s. He mocked Nagoya dialect by theorizing that Nagoyans would call ebi furai as ebi furyaa. Whilst this is false, it made people elsewhere to associate Nagoya with "ebi furyaa". Restaurants in Nagoya took the opportunity by offering inventions such as dishes actually named ebi furyaa, and a visual hybrid with the pride of Nagoya: the Golden shachi.

==== Other Japanese foods ====
Ebi katsu is breaded and deep-fried surimi (paste) of shrimp meat. It differs from ebi furai, which is a whole prawn.

Shrimp kakiage is a kind of tempura, airy, bulky and crunchy, made from a batch of chopped prawns or small whole shrimps, such as sakura shrimp.

=== Korea ===
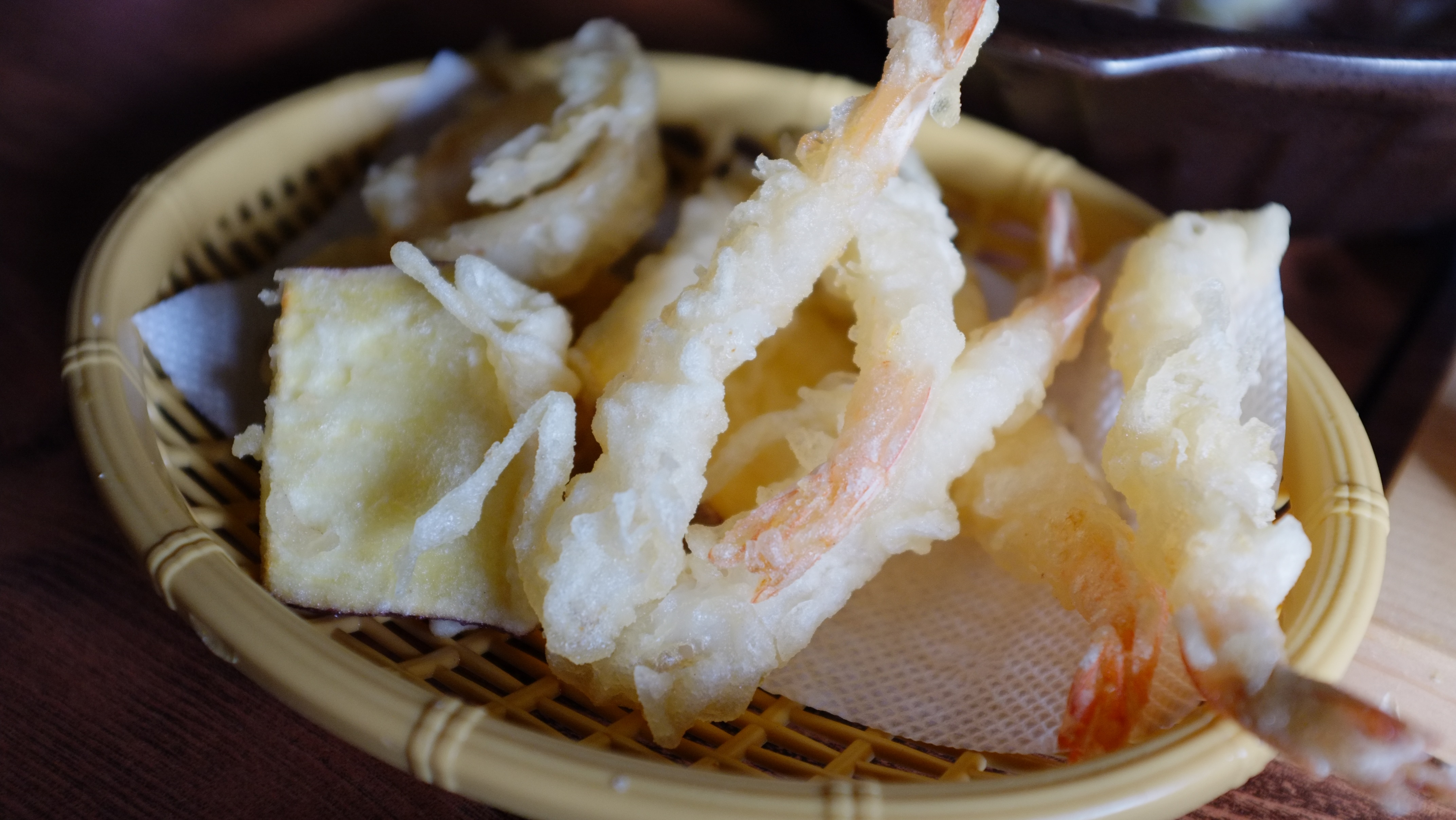
Saeu-twigim (fried shrimps) on a sokuri

In Korean cuisine, fried shrimp is known as saeu-twigim (새우튀김). Along with ojingeo-twigim (fried squid) and other twigims, it is a common street food and a bunsikjip (snack bar) item. It is also a common anju (food accompanying alcoholic drinks) for beer.

=== Philippines ===
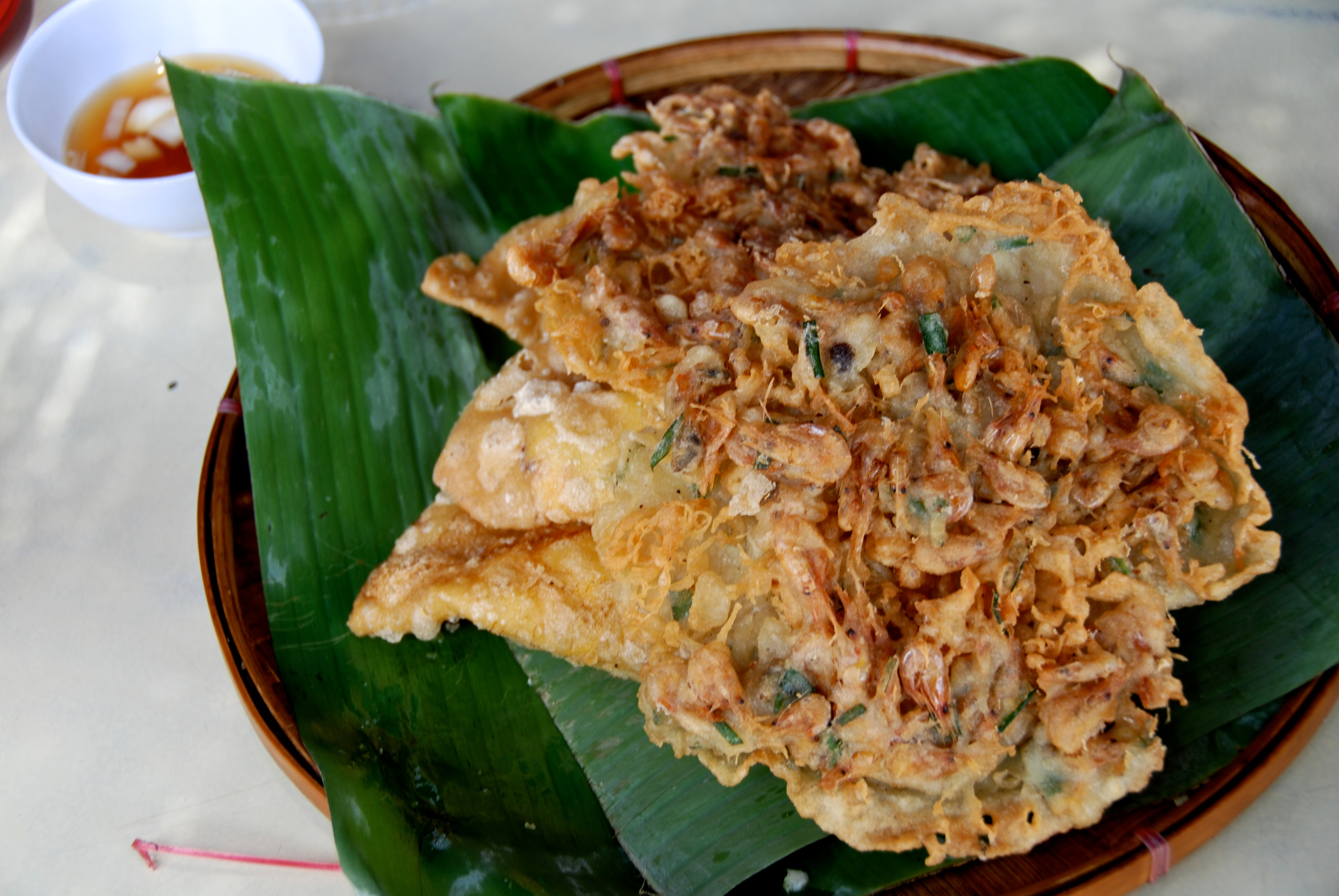
Okoy made from small unshelled shrimp

Fried shrimp dishes in Philippine cuisine include camaron rebosado (battered shrimp), okoy (battered shrimp pancakes), halabos na hipon (fried or boiled shrimp cooked in its own juices or carbonated soda), and nilasing na hipon (battered shrimp marinated in alcohol), among others.

Camaron rebosado is a deep-fried battered shrimp typically served with sweet and sour sauce. It is made by peeling large shrimp and marinating it in a mixture of calamansi juice, salt, and black pepper. It is then coated with a batter made from egg, flour, and corn starch before deep frying.

Okoy is another native Filipino deep-fried dish that typically use small unshelled shrimp. The batter is uniquely traditionally made from galapong (ground soaked glutinous rice), mixed with calabaza, sweet potatoes, or cassava and various vegetables like carrots, onions, and green papaya. It is deep-fried into flat crispy pancakes and traditionally served with a vinegar-based dipping sauce.

== See also ==
- List of deep fried foods
- List of Philippine dishes
- List of seafood dishes
- List of shrimp dishes
- Dishes containing fried shrimp
  - Po' boy - sandwich originally from Louisiana
