= Popcorn shrimp =

Shrimp fritter finger food

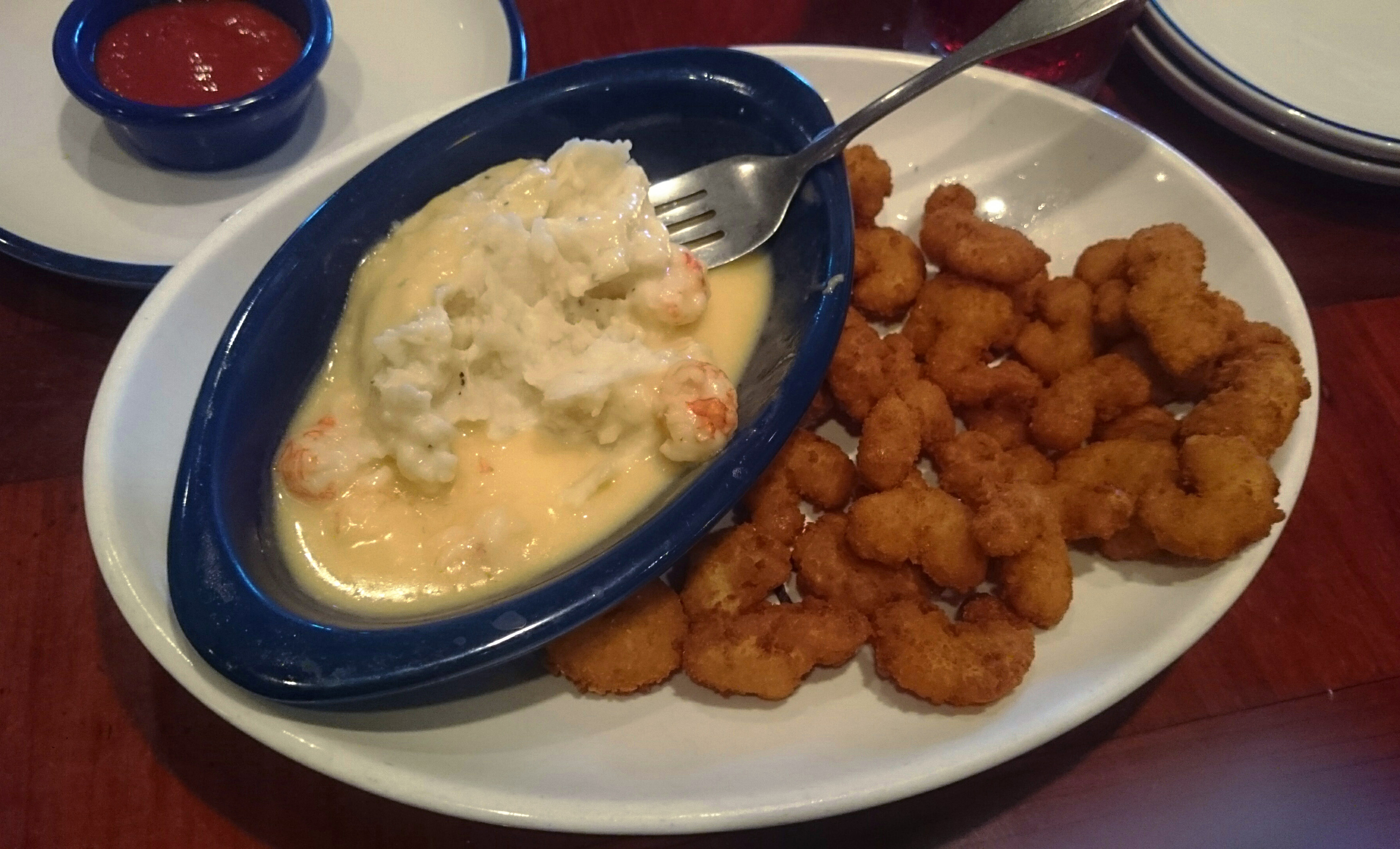
Popcorn shrimp on the right half of the plate

Popcorn shrimp is the name of several small shrimp fritter dishes, so called because they are finger foods eaten like popcorn.

In 1974, the American restaurant chain Red Lobster introduced a menu item called "popcorn shrimp", a fritter of small shrimp meat, which they still offer as of 2025.

Other restaurants were also serving menu items named "popcorn shrimp" as early as 1975.

In 1986, General Mills, the owner of Red Lobster at the time, applied to register the trademark "popcorn shrimp" with the United States Patent and Trademark Office, stating they had been using it since 1977. It took two years to be granted, but then General Mills cancelled it the following year.

Some sources suggest that popcorn shrimp originated as a Louisiana cuisine, and chef Paul Prudhomme made it famous. However, at least for the name, what Prudhomme invented was Cajun popcorn, which he put on the menu of the restaurant he worked, sometime later than 1975. Prudhomme published a recipe of Cajun popcorn in his cookbook in 1984. It is fritter of crayfish, made by dipping peeled crayfish tails in a batter of eggs, milk, corn flour, wheat flour, and spices, then deep-fryed, and served with sherry wine sauce. He added that shrimp can be used as a substitute for crayfish. Eventually, "popcorn shrimp" became associated with Prudhomme. Apart from names, neither Red Lobster's home page nor Prudhomme's book mention the origin of their dishes.

Today as of 2021 in the US, the words "popcorn shrimp" has no live trademark registration for foods, and over 20 companies sell packaged foods by that name.

Variations of popcorn shrimp span from heavily breaded styles, to light tempura-style.

== See also ==
- Fried shrimp
- List of shrimp dishes
- Popcorn chicken: small, bite-sized pieces of breaded fried chicken
