= Nilasing na hipon =

Filipino dish

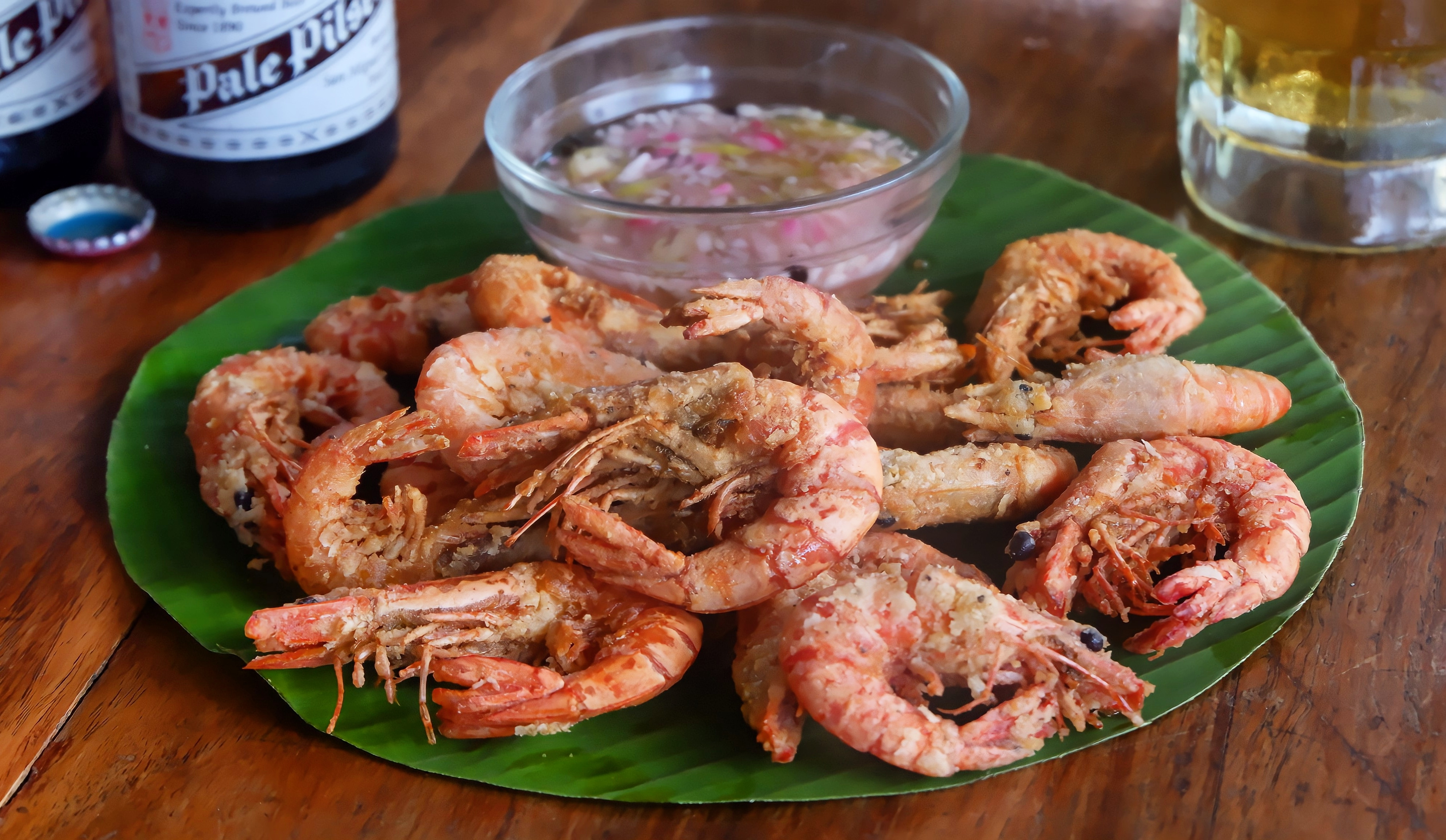
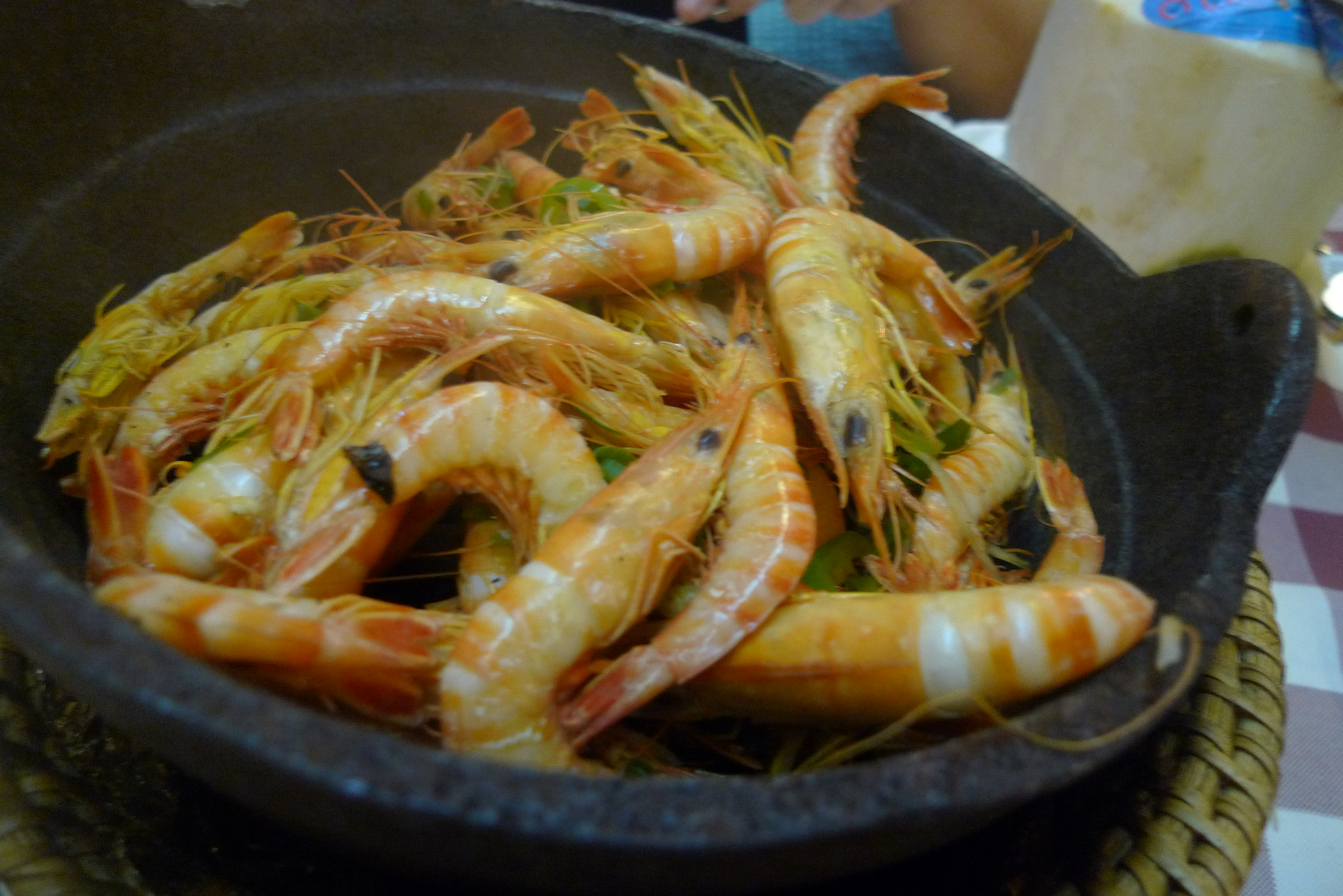
- Top: Nilasing na hipon with sawsawan (dipping sauce); Bottom: A variant of nilasing na hipon without batter
- Alternative names: Drunken shrimp, crispy fried drunken shrimp
- Course: Main dish
- Place of origin: Philippines
- Serving temperature: Hot

Nilasing na hipon (lit. "drunken shrimp") is a Filipino dish consisting of whole unshelled shrimp marinated in alcohol and various spices, usually coated in batter, and then deep-fried. It is usually dipped in a vinegar-based sauce. The alcohol used is traditionally rice wine like basi or arrack like lambanog; but modern versions can use other types of alcohol, most commonly gin, beer, or white wine.

The dish is commonly anglicized as drunken shrimp or crispy fried drunken shrimp in the Philippines, but it is not related to the Chinese dish of the same name which uses raw (usually live) or boiled shrimp and is not battered.

== See also ==
- Camaron rebosado
- Halabos
- List of shrimp dishes
- Okoy
