= Prawn soup =

Foodstuff

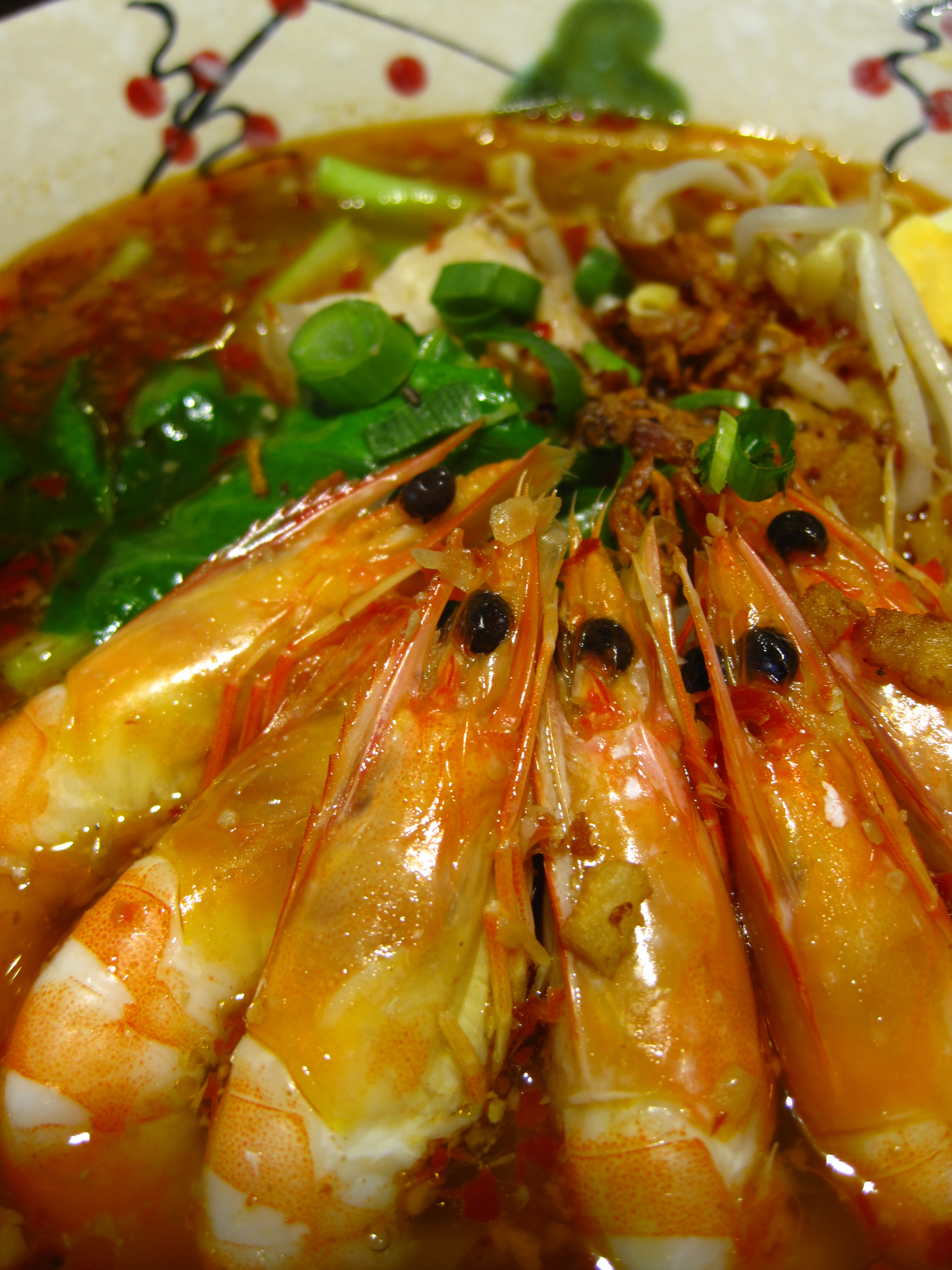
- Prawn mee with whole shrimp
- Type: Soup
- Serving temperature: Hot
- Main ingredients: Prawns
- Variations: Chupe de camarones, kaeng som kung, Penang Prawn Mee, rækjusúpa, shrimp chowder, tom yum goong

Prawn soup, also referred to as shrimp soup, is a soup dish prepared using freshwater or saltwater prawns as a primary ingredient. Several varieties of the dish exist in various areas of the world, including Penang prawn mee in Malaysia, Peruvian chupe de camarones, Thai kaeng som kung and Mexican caldo de camarones. Prawn and shrimp soup can be prepared as a broth- or stock-based soup, as a cream-based soup, or as a chowder. In the United States, cream of shrimp soup is mass-produced and distributed canned or frozen.

== Varieties by country ==
=== Iceland ===
Rækjusúpa [ˈraiːcʏˌsuːpa] is a shrimp soup in Icelandic cuisine prepared using shrimp, fish such as haddock, bacon, cream, corn, celery and other ingredients. It has been described as having a sweet and smoky flavor. Frozen shrimp can be used to prepare the dish.

=== Malaysia ===
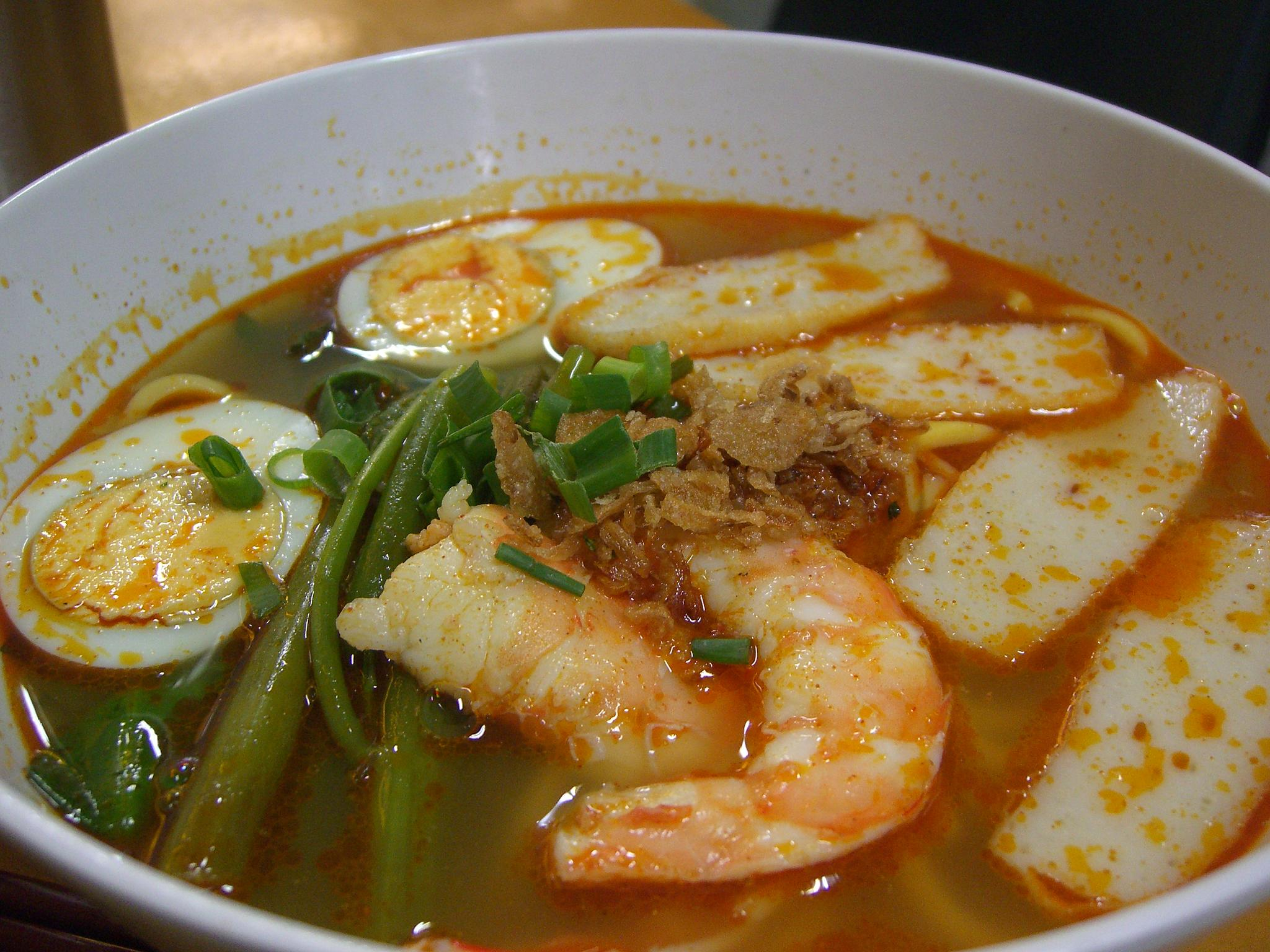
Penang prawn mee, a Malaysian prawn soup

Penang prawn mee, also referred to as har mee, is a prawn soup in Malaysian cuisine, and it is a specialty of Penang, Malaysia. The shells and heads of prawns are typically used to prepare the stock for this soup. Penang prawn mee is a street food in Penang.

=== Mexico ===
Caldo de camarones is known in Mexico as a shrimp-only dish. It is a variant of the common dish caldo de siete mares (seven seas soup).

=== Peru ===
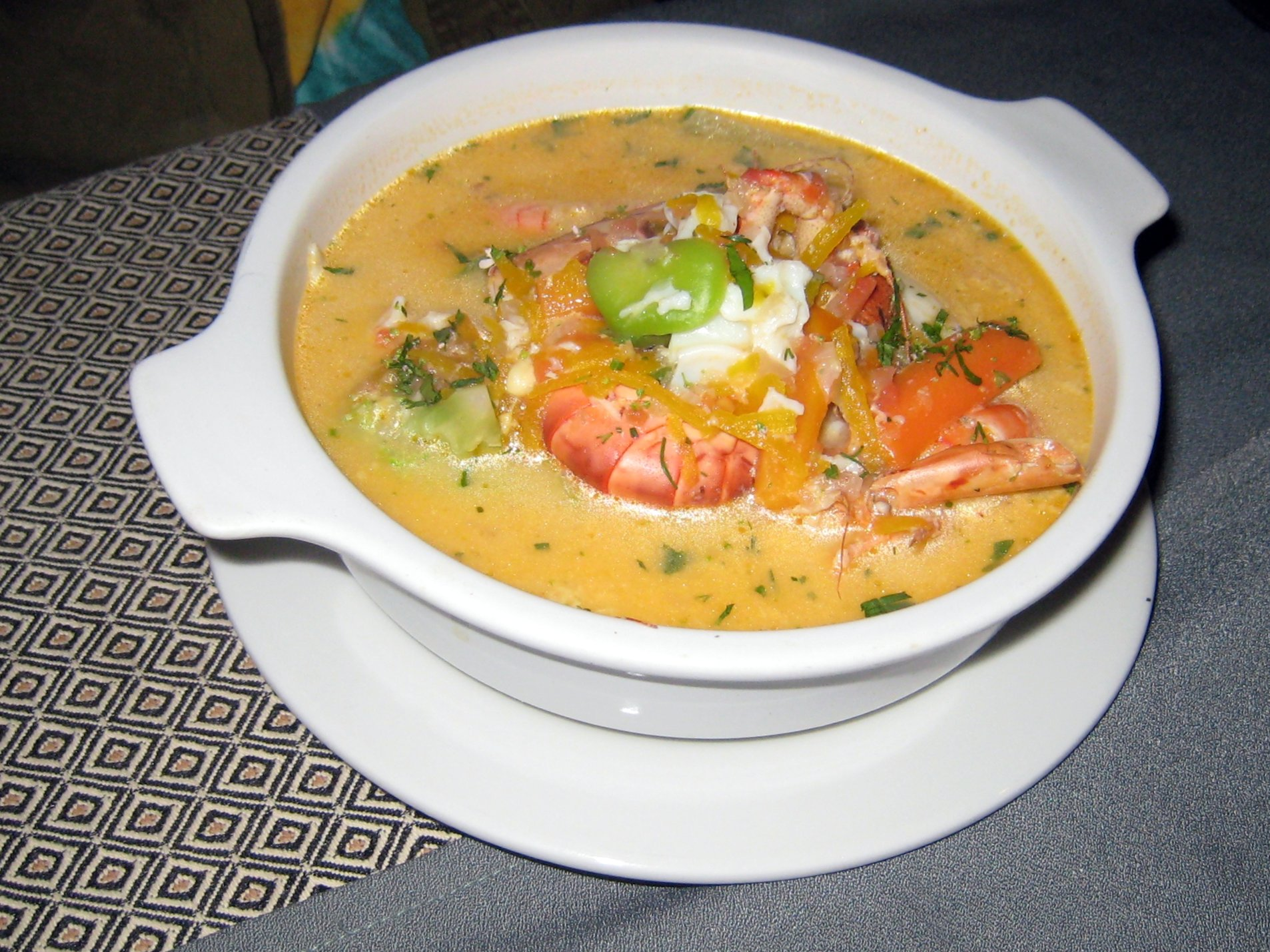
Chupe de camarones

Chupe de camarones (American English: "shrimp soup") is a common dish in Peru, and is a traditional part of Peruvian cuisine. The basic ingredients in the dish are river prawns, fish, potatoes, eggs, milk, oregano and chili peppers. Freshwater crayfish from rivers are also used to prepare chupe de camarones in Peru. It has been described as having the consistency of a chowder. In July 2016 in Lima, Peru, a resolution was proclaimed by chefs and local owners of picanterías and restaurants for a chupe de camarones week in honor of the dish, which occurred from July 10–16, 2016, in restaurants in Lima, Tacna and Arequipa.

=== Philippines ===
Sinigang na hipon is a tamarind-based sour soup served in the Philippines. It is made with shrimps or prawns, onions, water spinach, radishes, tomatoes, and long green chili peppers, and usually seasoned with fish sauce.

=== Thailand ===
Kaeng som kung, also referred to as kaeng som or gaeng som (Thai: แกงส้ม), is a soup dish in Thai cuisine that originated in southern Thailand. (Note: "...and serves a few southern Thai dishes such as kaeng som kung (“sour prawn ...") It is a spicy and sour soup prepared with prawns, vegetables and curry spices.

Tom yum goong (sour prawn soup), also referred to as tom yum and tom yam (Thai: ต้มยำ), is a Thai soup dish. It is a spicy soup prepared with a clear and light broth.

Thai prawn soups

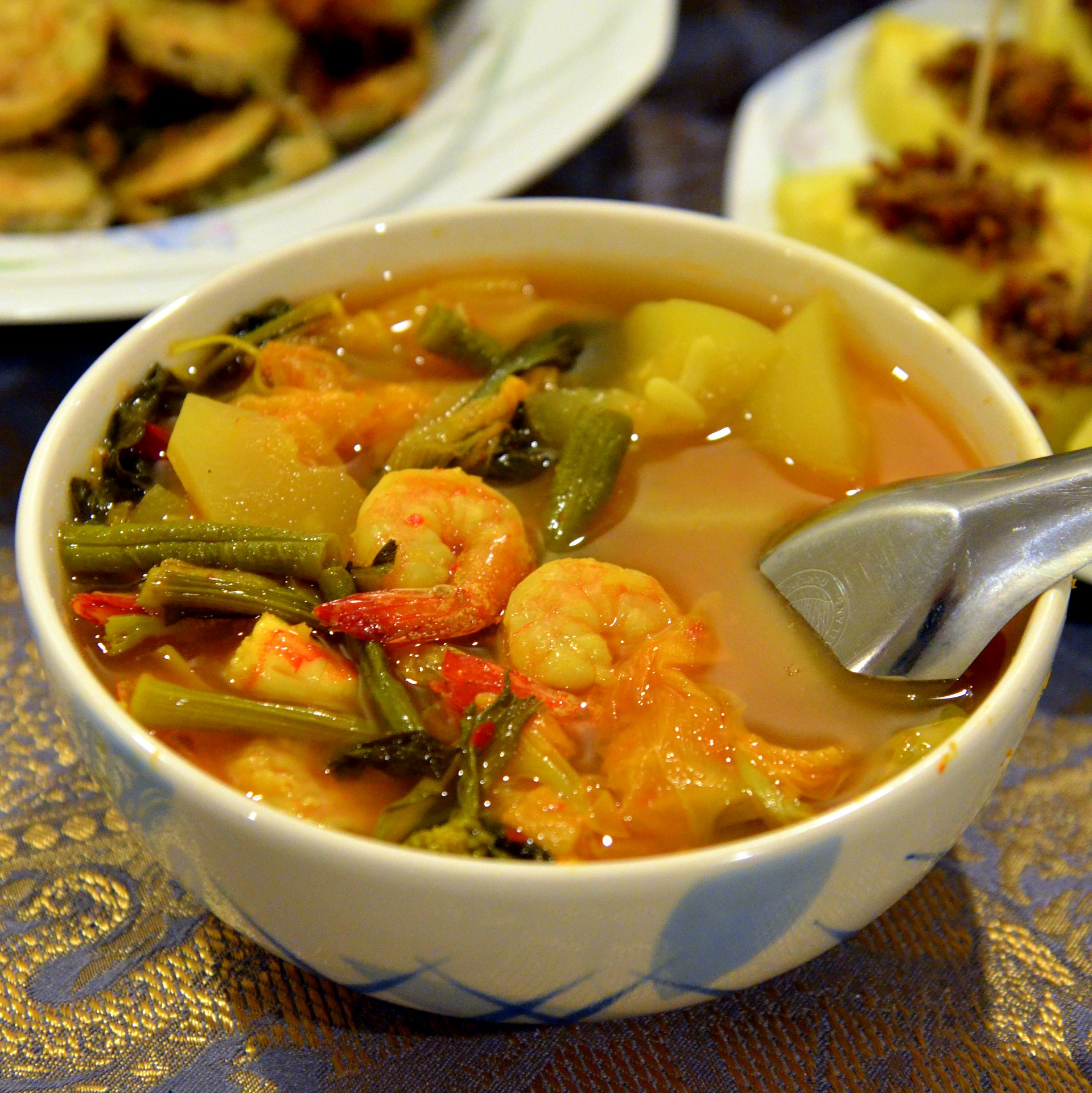
Kaeng som kung

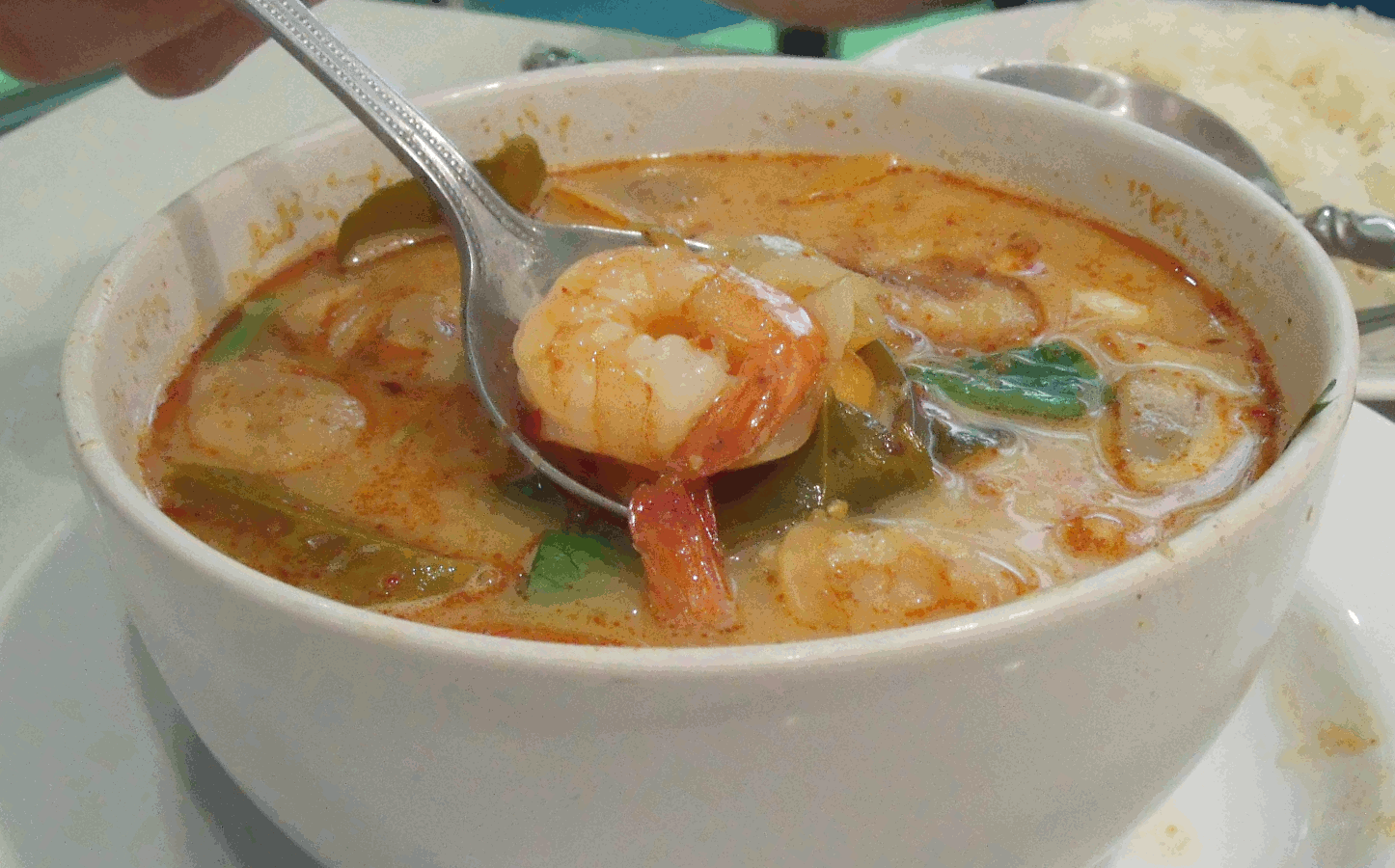
Tom yum goong, a Thai prawn soup

=== United States ===
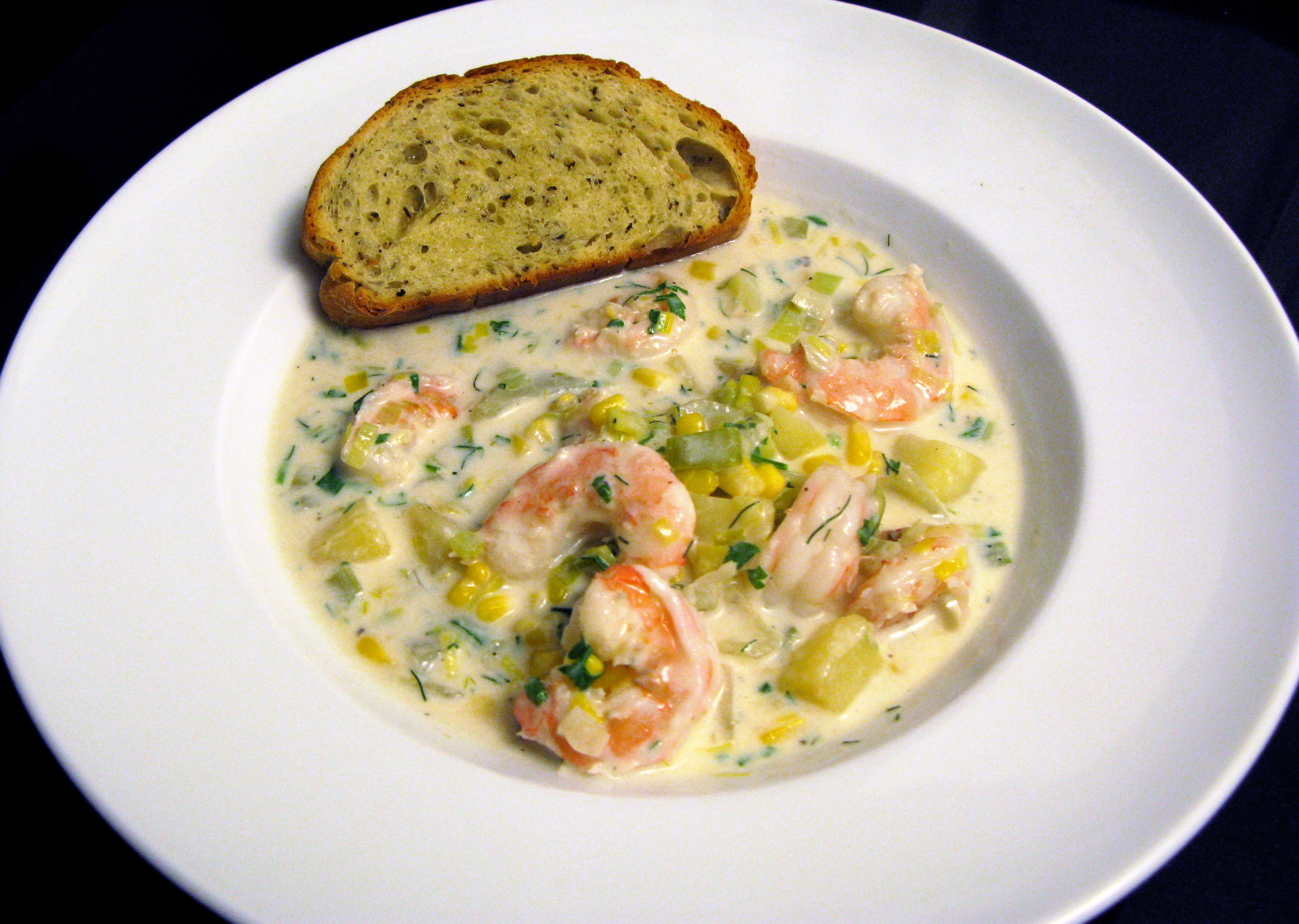
Shrimp chowder

Shrimp chowder is a dish that is prevalent in the Gulf states of the United States. It is prepared in typical chowder fashion, using milk or cream, potatoes, onion, shallots, celery, broth or stock, and shrimp. Additional ingredients are also sometimes used. Shrimp chowder is also prepared in the U.S. state of Maine.

== Mass production ==
Cream of shrimp soup is a mass-produced canned soup product in the United States. The Campbell Soup Company manufactures and markets a condensed cream of shrimp canned soup. Circa the 1960s, the Campbell Soup Company manufactured and marketed a frozen cream of shrimp soup. In addition to being consumed as a soup, prepared cream of shrimp soup can be used as an ingredient in dishes such as seafood meat molds and in crawfish pie.

== Gallery ==
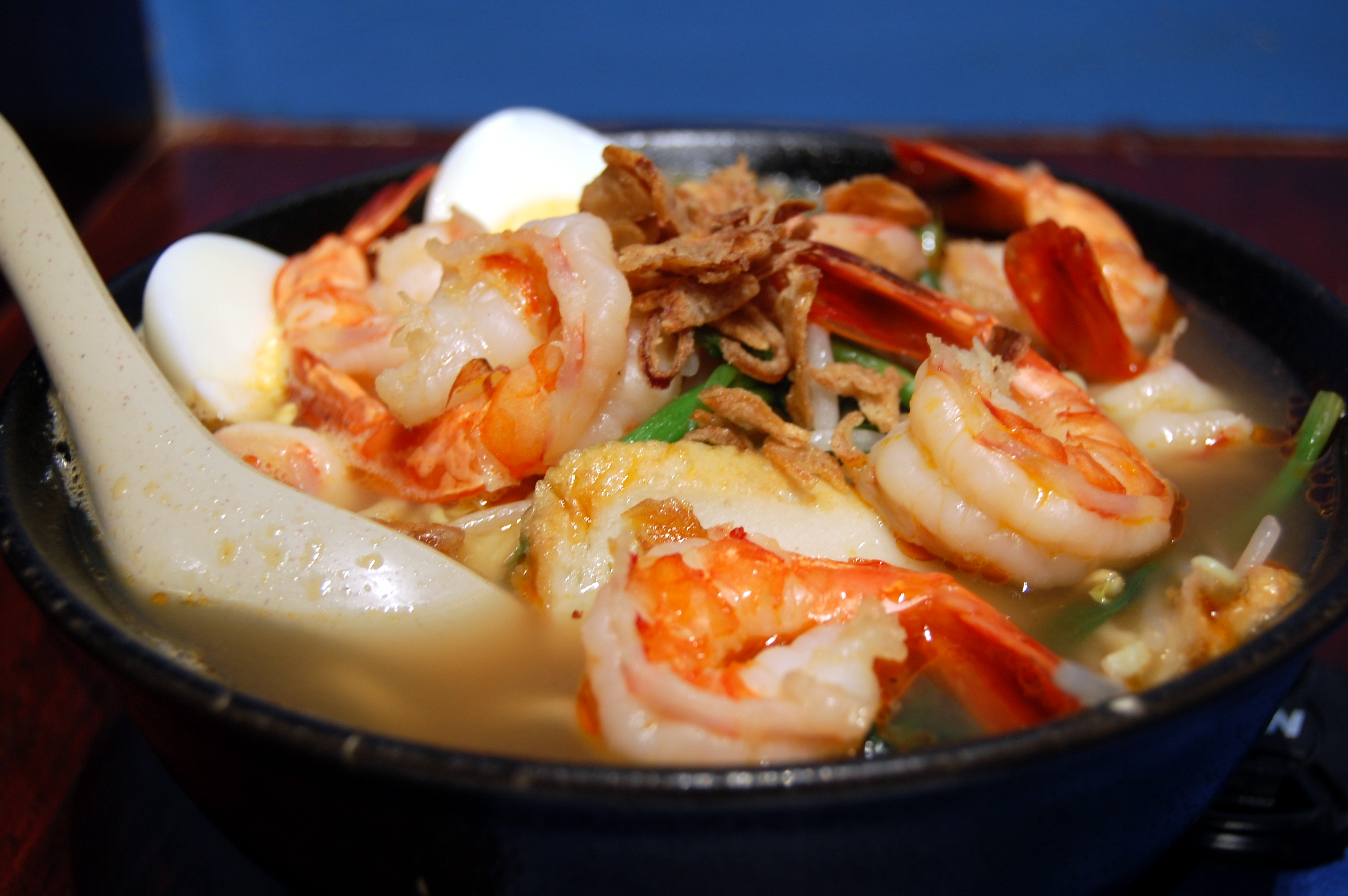
A prawn and noodle soup

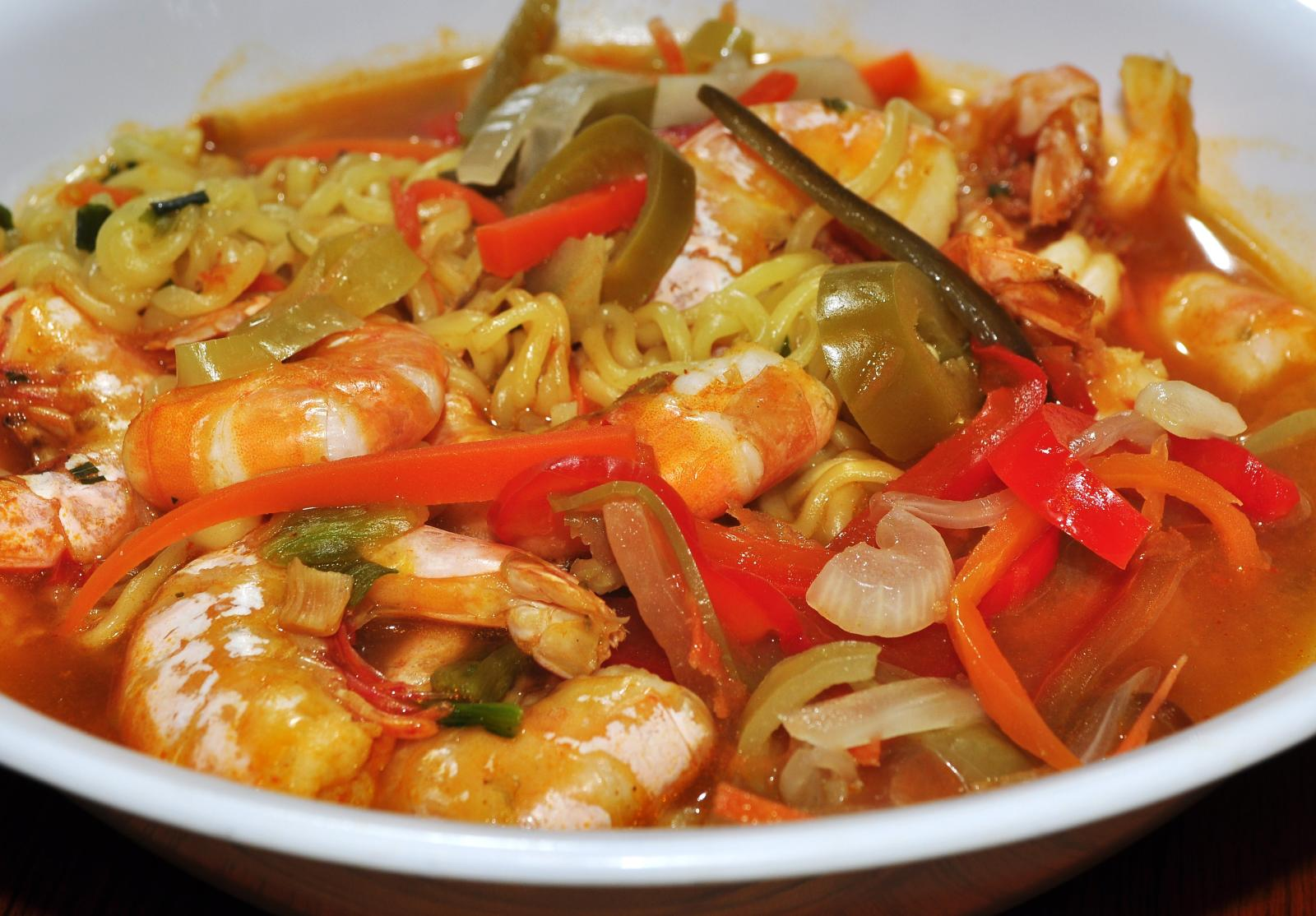
A spicy prawn and noodle soup

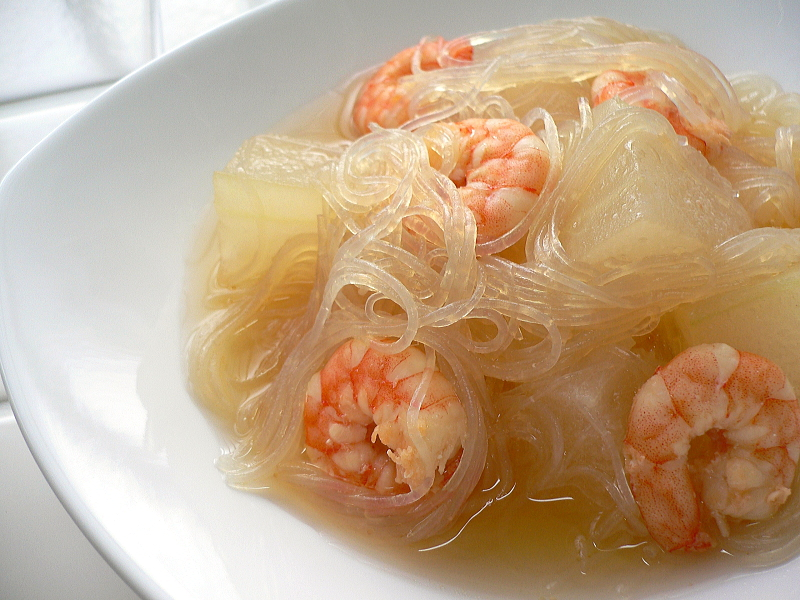
Tougan shrimp soup

== See also ==
- Fish soup
- Hae mee
- List of shrimp dishes
- List of soups
- List of cream soups
- Shrimp and prawn as food
