= Kung chae nampla =

Thai salad dish

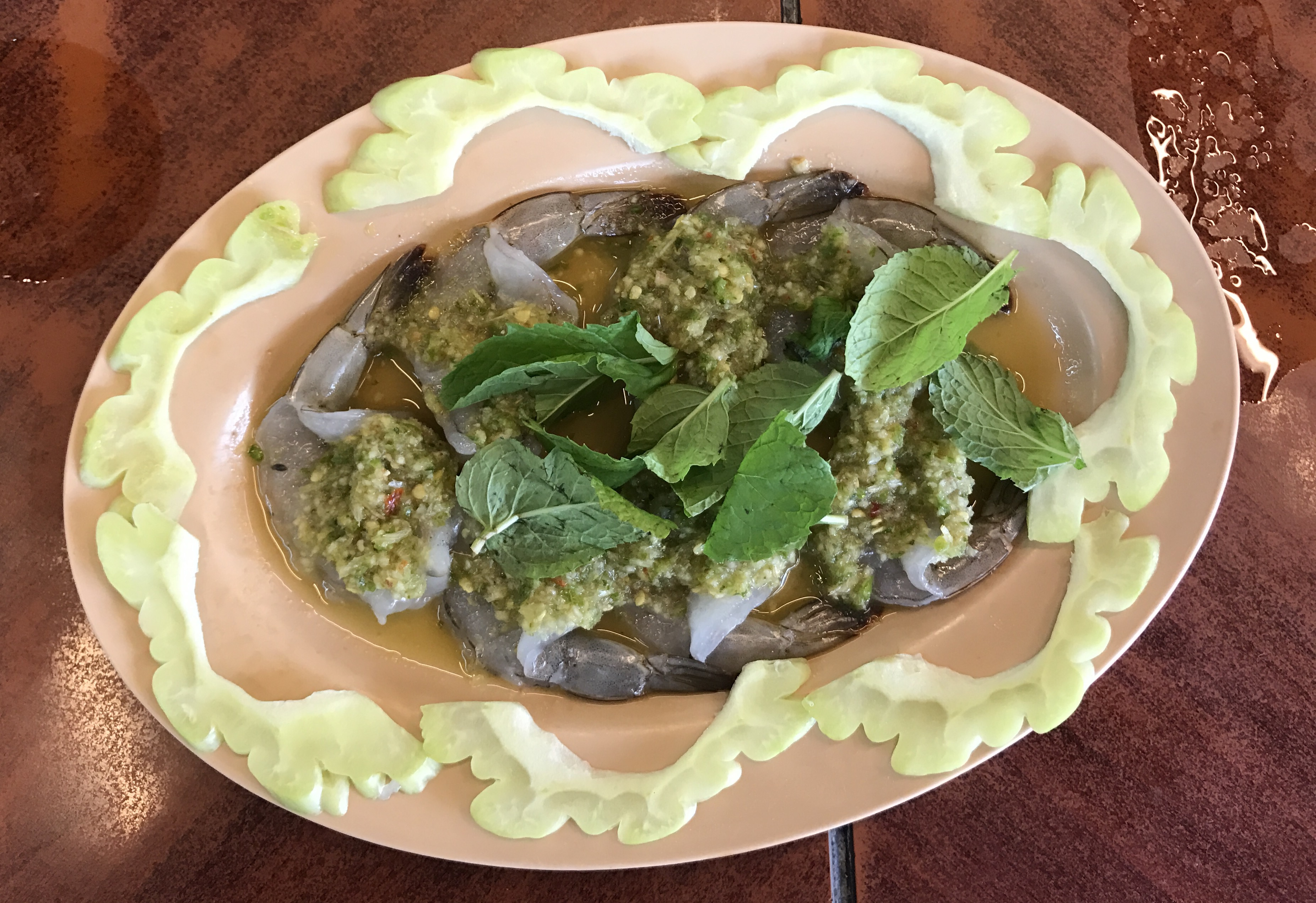
- Shrimp in fish sauce as served in Bangkok, Thailand
- Alternative names: Spicy raw shrimp salad, Thai marinated raw prawns
- Type: Salad
- Place of origin: Central Thailand
- Region or state: Southeast Asia
- Associated cuisine: Thai
- Serving temperature: Cold
- Main ingredients: Whiteleg shrimp, garlic, chilies, lime juice, fish sauce, spicy sauce

Kung chae nampla (Thai: กุ้งแช่น้ำปลา, pronounced [kûŋ t͡ɕʰɛ̂ː nám.plāː]) is a Thai salad made from fresh raw shrimp soaked in Thai fish sauce and served with chunks of gourd, cloves of garlic, chilies, and spicy sauce. Generally, Thais usually use whiteleg shrimp in this dish.

== Origin ==
The origin of kung chae nampla is not clear but it believes that it has been a dish since in early Rattanakosin era (about 1782 – 1851) and it was originally found widespread in Thailand. It has become popular as an appetizer.

== Controversial issue ==
Many people are afraid of sickness because raw shrimps that are used in this menu are risky of having Vibrio parahaemolyticus bacteria. It can cause abdominal pain and diarrhea to ones who eat it (Germs from shrimp in fish sauce, 2014).

== Types ==
There are different types of kung chae nampla. First of all, the original one, is served with chunks of gourd, cloves of garlic, and chilies with a spicy sauce that is served separately. Second, another version is served with lemongrass added. Lastly, there is the pour over version, which is served with the spicy sauce poured over the shrimp whereas other versions keep the spicy sauce separate when serving.

== Related dishes ==
Similarly, there is also another spicy shrimp salad (Thai: พล่ากุ้ง, RTGS: phla kung). However, it has boiled shrimp, lime juice, kaffir lime leaves and lemon grass as the main ingredients.

== See also ==
- List of salads
- List of shrimp dishes
