= Tainan shrimp rice =

Taiwanese seafood rice dish

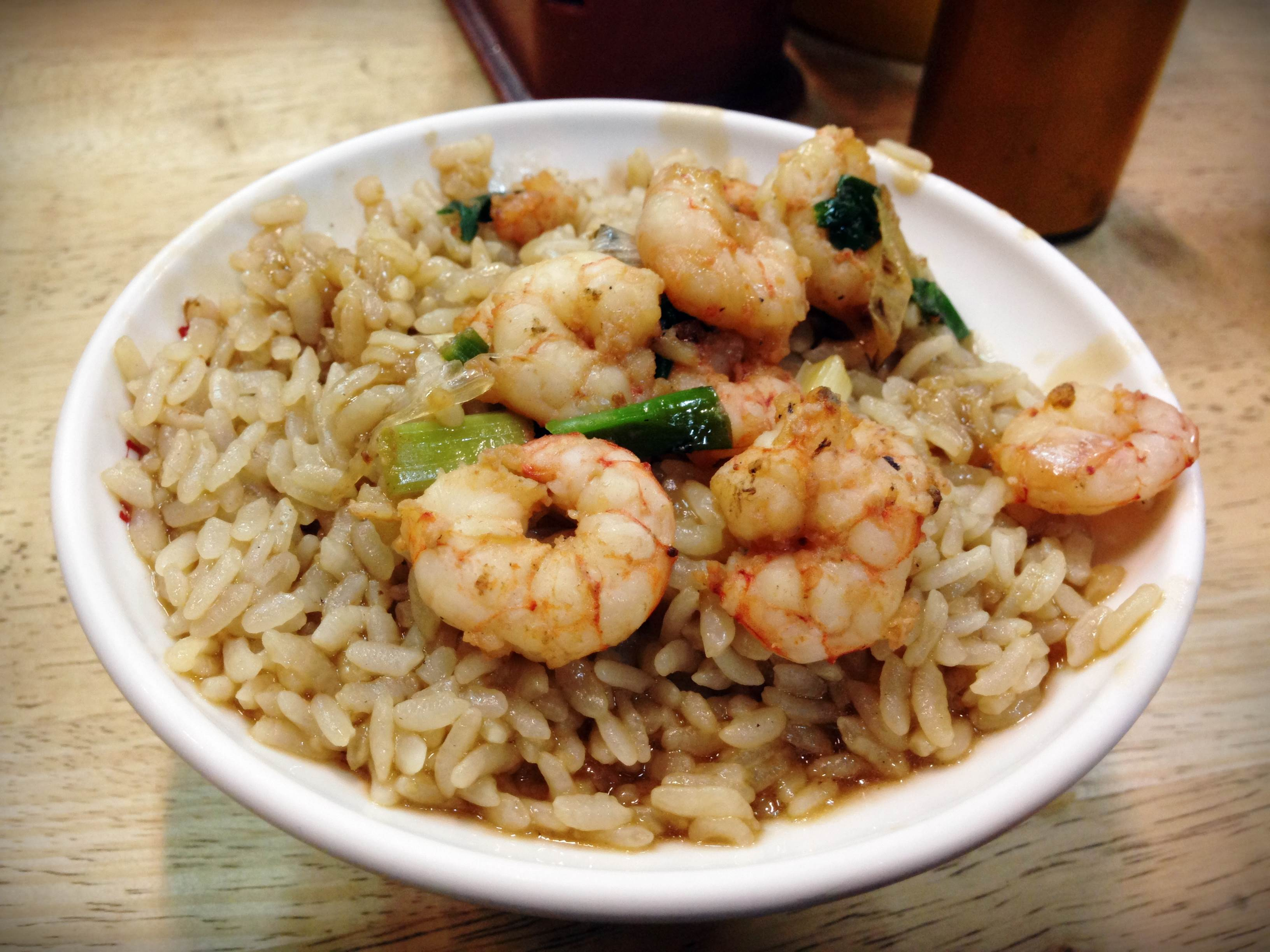
- Place of origin: Taiwan
- Region or state: Tainan
- Main ingredients: whiskered velvet shrimp, lard, rice

Tainan shrimp rice (Chinese: 蝦仁飯; Tongyong Pinyin: Sīa rén fàn; Tâi-lô: Hê-jîn-pn̄g) is a traditional Taiwanese seafood rice dish that originated in the city of Tainan in southern Taiwan. The shrimp used in the dish is known as whiskered velvet shrimp, which is paired with a prepared sauce and stewing rice in shrimp broth. The rice grains absorb the broth, making the texture moist, just like risotto. The dish was included in the 2024 Taiwan President Lai Ching-te's inaugural state banquet.

The origin of the dish dates back to 1922 during the Japanese colonial era, when the founder of the restaurant "Ai Zai Cheng" (矮仔成) in Ximending named Ia̍p Sîng (葉成) invented the dish. Ia̍p Sîng had learned his craft at the Japanese restaurant "Meigetsuro" (明月楼).

== See also ==
- Taiwanese cuisine
- Chiayi turkey rice
- Tube rice pudding
