= Pineapple shrimp balls =

Taiwanese shrimp dish

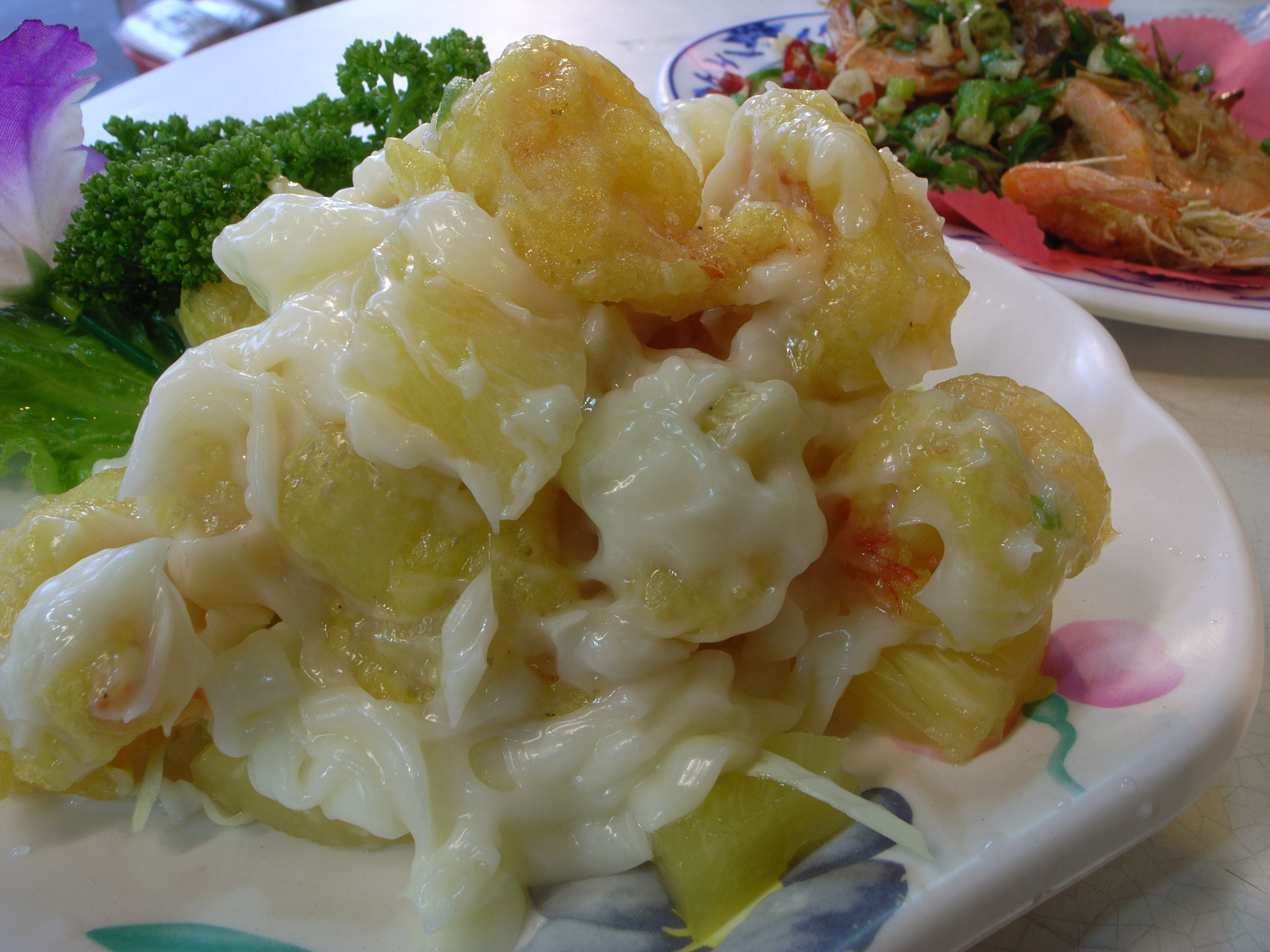
- Type: Fried food
- Course: Dish
- Place of origin: Taiwan
- Main ingredients: shrimp, pineapple, mayonnaise

Pineapple Shrimp Balls (Chinese: 鳳梨蝦球) is a Taiwanese dish commonly found in Pān-toh, beer halls, and Rechao eateries. The dish typically consists of large shrimp that are peeled, battered, and deep-fried until crisp. The shrimps are then mixed with canned pineapple chunks and coated with mayonnaise. The flavor of the dish is both sweet and savory, which is representative of modern Taiwanese cuisine.

Pineapple shrimp balls is not a traditional Taiwanese dish, but rather emerged during the early 20th century when Taiwan became a major producer of pineapples during the Japanese colonial era. By the late 20th century, advances in large-scale farming of tiger prawns made shrimp more affordable and accessible. These conditions made it easier for restaurants to develop dishes that combines shrimp with pineapple as a cost-effective and popular menu item.

The use of mayonnaise in pineapple shrimp balls and many other local dishes reflects the influence of Japanese culinary on Taiwanese food culture.

== See also ==
- Taiwanese cuisine
- List of shrimp dishes
