= Dobin mushi =

Traditional Japanese broth

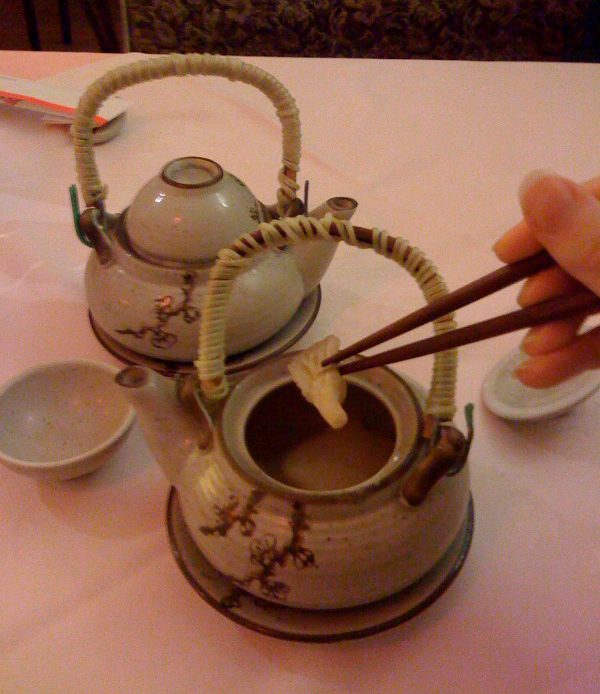
Dobin mushi teapots

Dobin mushi (土瓶蒸し) is a traditional Japanese broth, steamed and served in a dobin tea pot with shrimp, chicken, soy sauce, lime, and matsutake mushroom.
