= Cahuamanta =

Mexican seafood dish

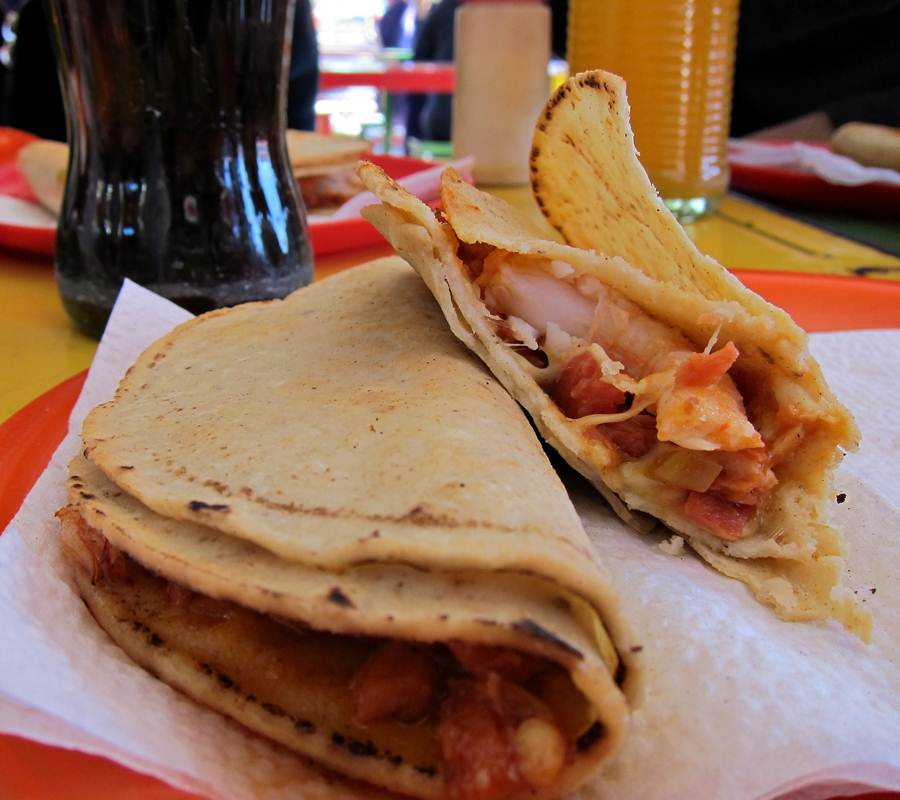
Cahuamanta in taco form

Cahuamanta or caguamanta is a typical Mexican seafood dish made with ray (often confused with manta ray) and shrimp. It is usually prepared as soup, containing ray, shrimp and vegetables; it also can be prepared as a taco, wrapped in corn tortilla like other seafood tacos. When the broth is served alone, it is called bichi taken from the Yaqui language word that means "naked."

Originally, the main ingredient was sea turtle (cahuama), but due to it being placed on the endangered species list its hunting has been outlawed. Since then, ray and shrimp have become the main ingredients.

== Origin and diffusion ==
According to some authors, as stated by chef Ricardo Muñoz Zurita in his Diccionario enciclopédico de la Gastronomía Mexicana, cahuamanta originated in the south of Sonora in Ciudad Obregón, at the end of the 19th century. From there it quickly spread to other cities in the state of Sonora, as well as in the north of the state of Sinaloa, especially in Los Mochis and even Mazatlán. The Sinaloan style cahuamanta includes shrimp as standard, while the Sonoran style does not always.

Other theories trace its origin to Santa Rosalía, Baja California Sur. Cahuamanta has also become popular in Tijuana and other areas of the California peninsula, and even on the coasts of Nayarit and Jalisco.

In popular wisdom, cahuamanta is recommended as a remedy for hangover (or, as it is colloquially called in Mexico, "cruda").
