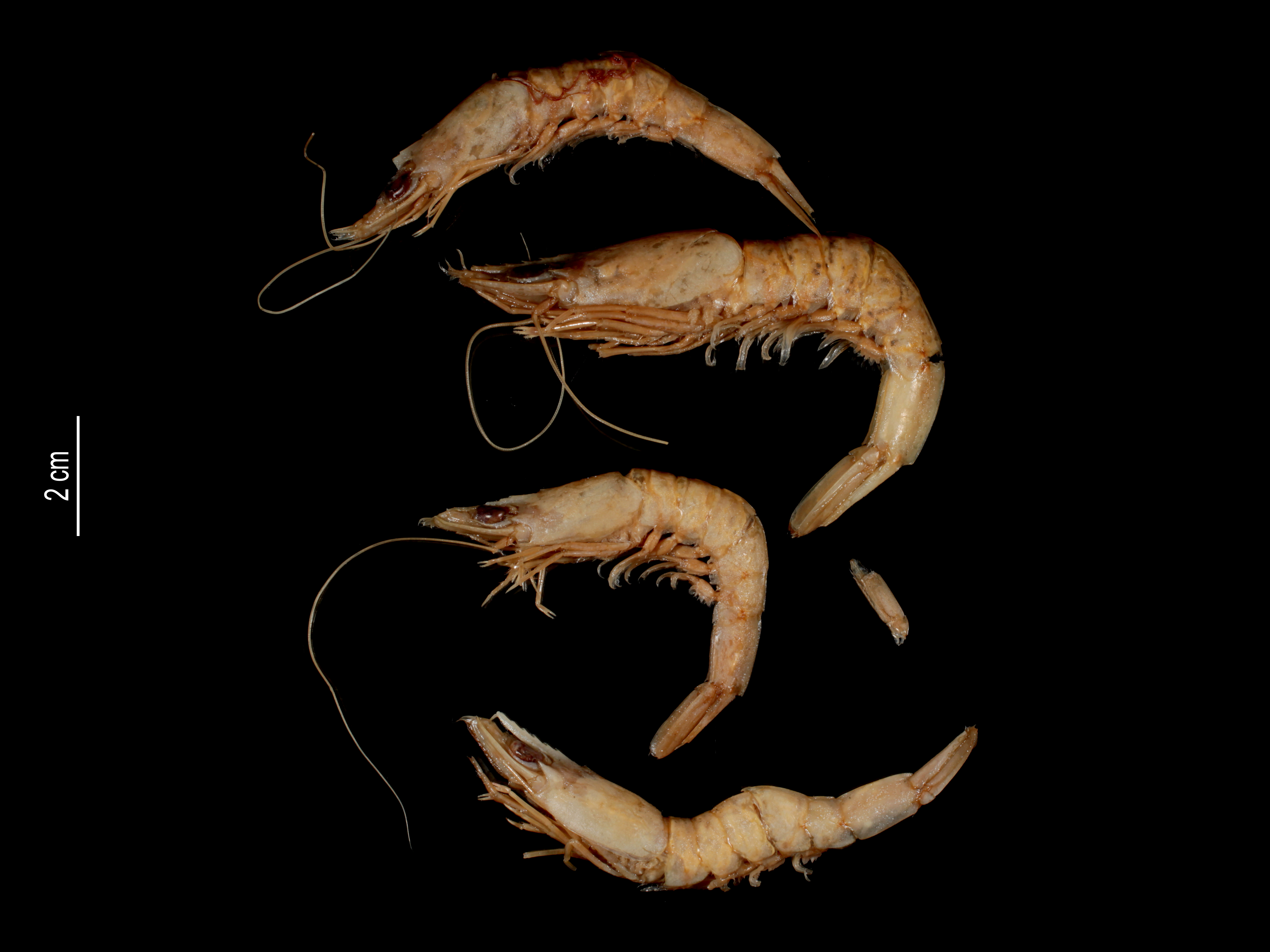

Scientific classification
- Kingdom: Animalia
- Phylum: Arthropoda
- Clade: Pancrustacea
- Class: Malacostraca
- Order: Decapoda
- Suborder: Dendrobranchiata
- Family: Penaeidae
- Genus: Metapenaeopsis
- Species: M. barbata

Binomial name
- Metapenaeopsis barbata (De Haan, 1844)

= Metapenaeopsis barbata =

Species of crustacean

Metapenaeopsis barbata, commonly known as the whiskered velvet shrimp, is a species of prawn in the family Penaeidae. It is benthic, living in the depth range of 20–70 m. M. barbata grows up to 108 mm in length.

== Distribution ==
Metapenaeopsis barbata is found in the Indo-west Pacific, from Japan through to Indonesia.

== Anatomy ==
Metapenaeopsis barbata can be differentiated from similar species through its anatomical features. Its stridulating organ is strongly upcurved with between 18 and 23 ridges, and it has a large pterygostomial spine. It usually has 6–7 rostral teeth.

== Mating ==
Specimens of M. barbata have been recorded to lay between 2,600 and 26,400 eggs during season.
