= Camaron rebosado =

Philippine shrimp dish

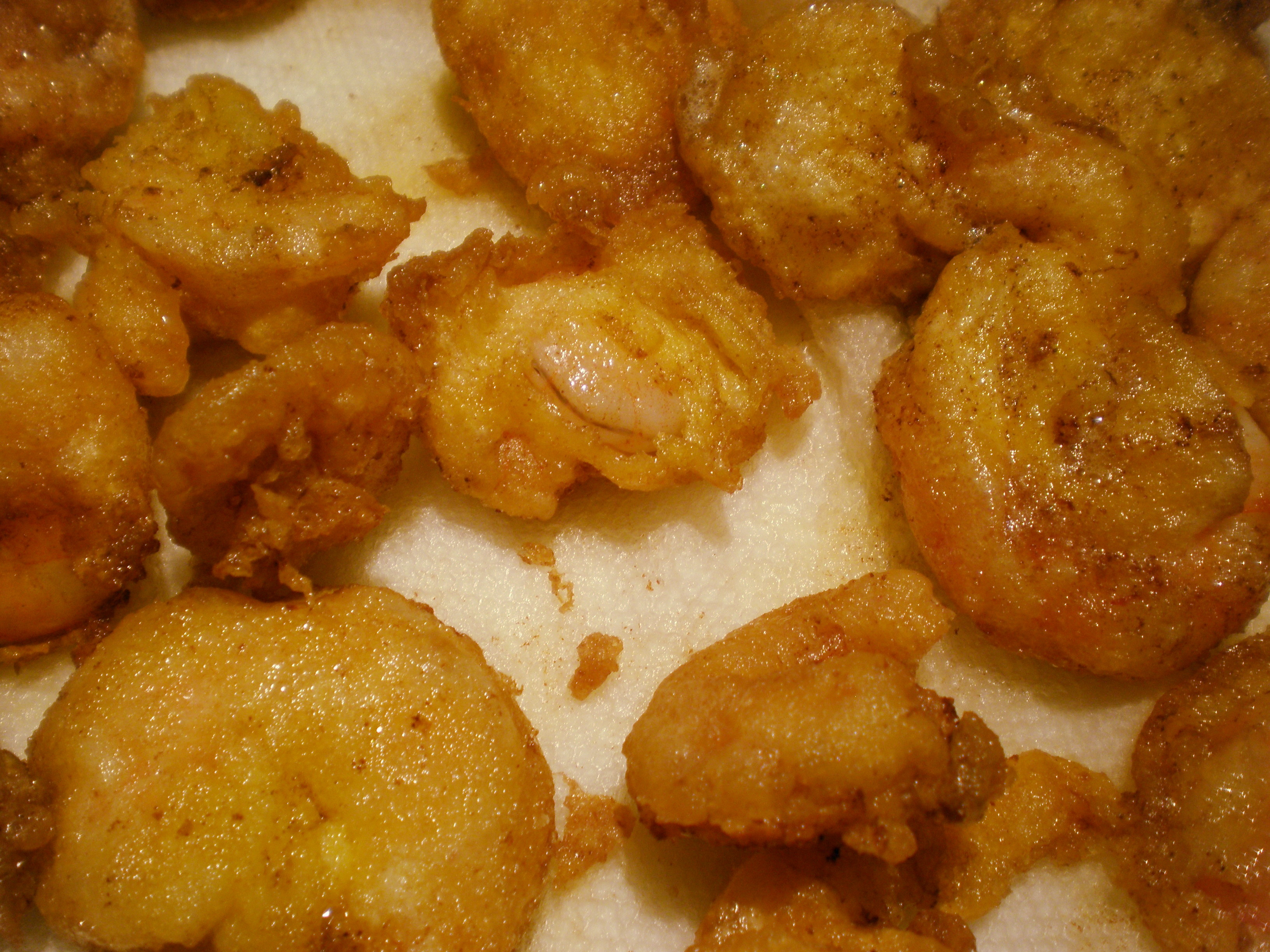
- Alternative names: Camarón rebozado Rebosadong hipon
- Course: Main dish
- Place of origin: Philippines
- Serving temperature: Hot
- Main ingredients: shrimp, batter
- Variations: Camarón rebozado con jamon

Camaron rebosado is a deep-fried battered shrimp dish in Philippine cuisine. It is usually served with a sweet and sour sauce. It is a common dish in Philippine cuisine.

== Etymology ==
The term camaron rebosado comes from the Spanish phrase camarón rebozado ("battered shrimp"). Due to the practice of seseo in the Spanish spoken at the time of its introduction, the latter part of the phrase was pronounced as a homophone of rebosado ("bursting"), and was thus rendered into Tagalog as kamaron rebosado. Despite the Spanish name, the dish is Chinese Filipino, originally introduced by Chinese migrants to the Philippines.

== Preparation ==
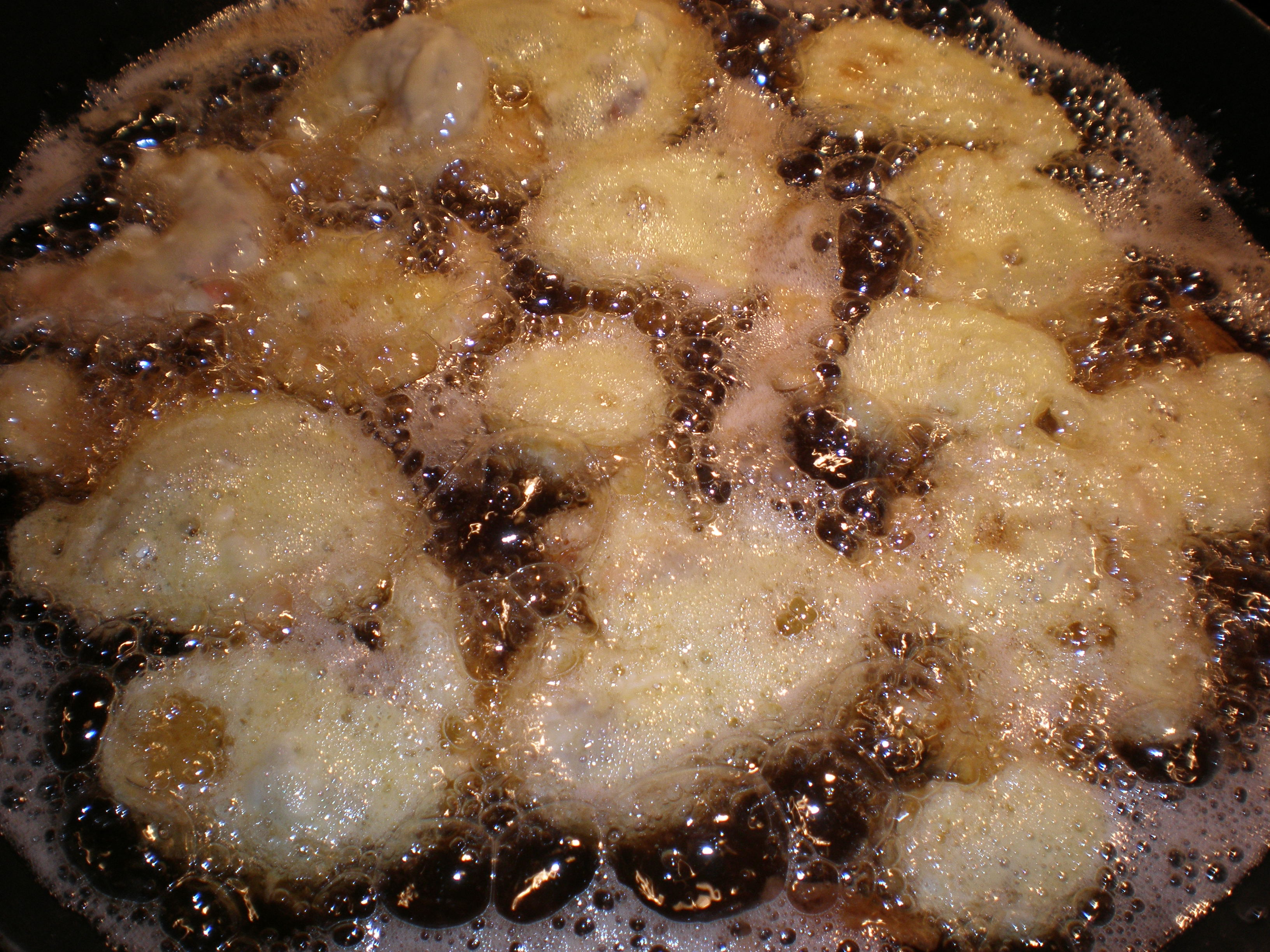
Camaron rebosado being fried

Camaron rebosado is prepared by removing the heads, and sometimes the tails as well, of the shrimp. It is then sliced lengthwise along the back and butterflied, with the vein removed. The shrimp is then marinated for a few minutes in a mixture of calamansi juice, salt, black pepper, garlic, and other spices to taste. The batter is made by mixing flour with egg, black pepper, corn starch or baking powder, and water. The shrimp is coated evenly and then fried in hot oil. It is also common to coat the shrimp in bread crumbs before frying.

Camaron rebosado is traditionally served with sweet and sour sauce (agre dulce). The sauce may be poured atop the cooked shrimp or served as a dipping sauce. It can also be served with soy sauce and calamansi juice (toyomansi), garlic-infused mayonnaise, or tomato and banana ketchup.

Camaron rebosado is similar to Japanese tempura, although tempura uses a lighter batter that is chilled before frying.

== Variations ==
Camaron rebosado con jamon (also spelled camaron rebosado con hamon) is a variation of the dish that includes ham wrapped around the shrimp in its preparation. It is a traditional dish in the Binondo district of Manila, the city's Chinatown.

== See also ==
- Calamares
- Fried prawn
- Okoy
- Pancit choca
- List of deep fried foods
- List of Philippine dishes
- List of seafood dishes
- List of shrimp dishes
