= Tenmusu =

Japanese rice ball filled with tempura shrimp

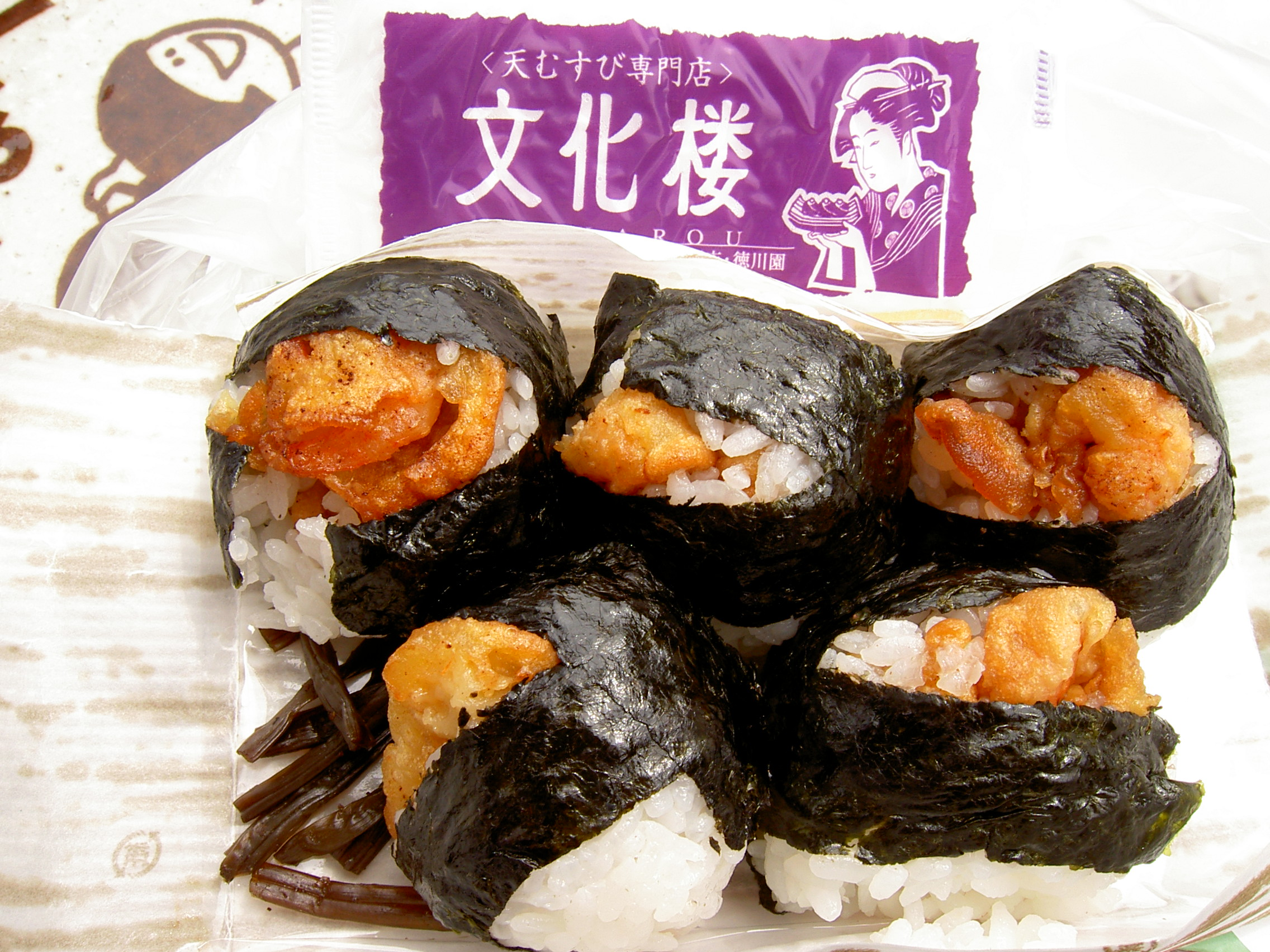
Tenmusu

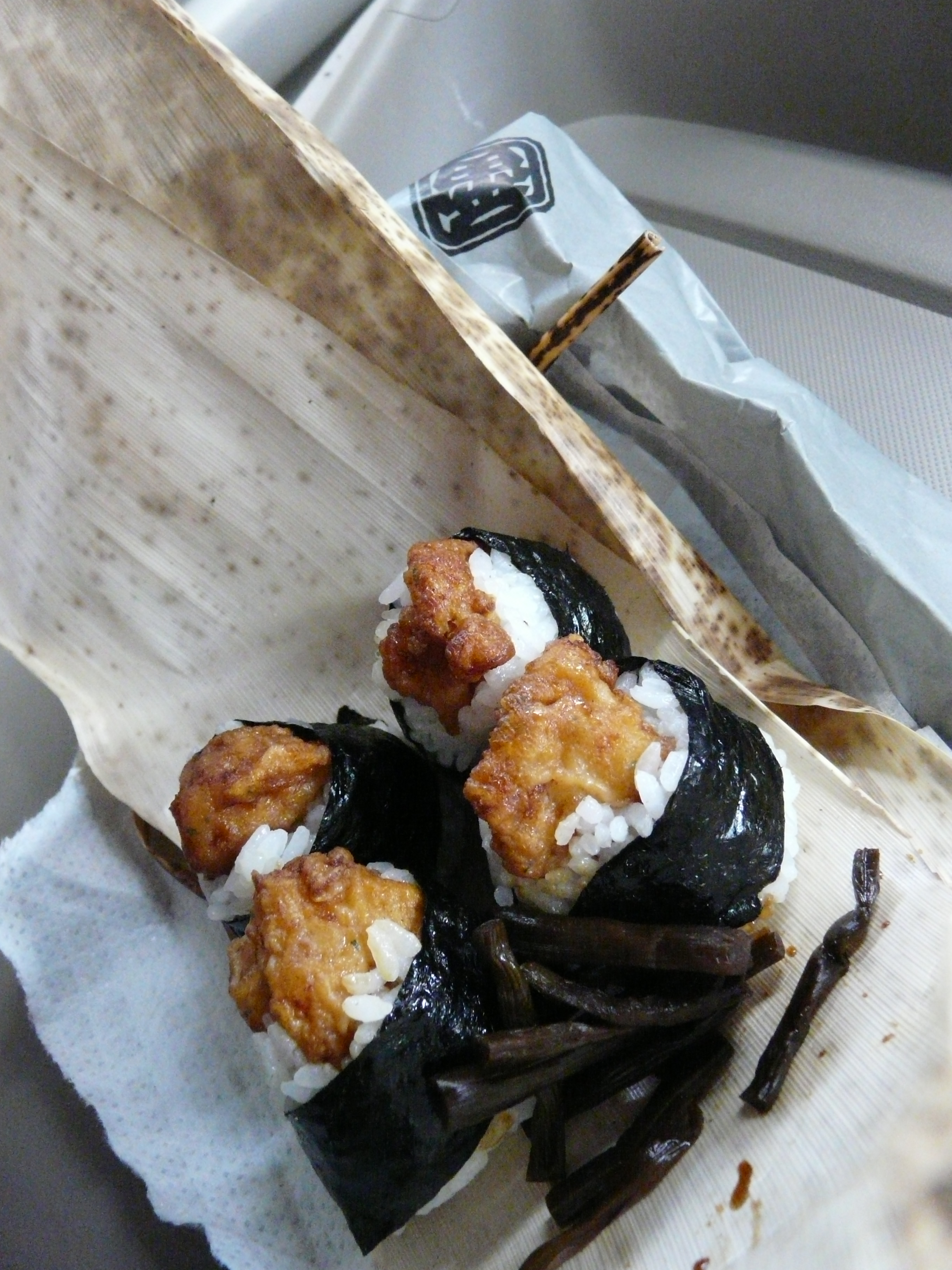
Tenmusu

Tenmusu, also spelled as ten-musu, is a dish in Japanese cuisine that consists of a rice ball wrapped with nori that is filled with deep-fried tempura shrimp. Tenmusu is sometimes included as a food in bento boxes.

== History ==
Tenmusu originated in the Mie prefecture region of Japan. In contemporary times, it is regarded as a specialty dish of Nagoya, located in the Chūbu region of Japan, and is a part of Nagoya cuisine.

== See also ==
- List of Japanese dishes
- List of rice dishes
- List of shrimp dishes
- Onigiri
